= List of Russian films of 2024 =

This is a list of films produced in Russia in 2024 (see 2024 in film).

== Box office ==
The highest-grossing Russian films released in 2024, by global box office gross revenue, are as follows:

Running film

Highest-grossing films released in 2024
Rank	Title	Distributor	Domestic gross
1	Serf 2	Central Partnership	$43,311,804
2	The Bremen Town Musicians	Central Partnership	$33,734,462

== Film releases ==
Opening		Title	Russian title	Cast and crew	Details
J A N U A R Y	1	The Bremen Town Musicians	Бременские музыканты	Director: Aleksey Nuzhnyy; Cast: Tikhon Zhiznevsky, Valentina Lyapina, Sergey Burunov, Mariya Aronova, Askar Nigamedzyanov, Irina Gorbacheva, Roman Kurtsyn, Dmitri Dyuzhev	Central Partnership / Studio TriTe / Russia-1 / Soyuzmultfilm; A musical fantasy film based on the 1969 Soviet animated short film The Bremen Town Musicians and its 1973 sequel On the Trail of the Bremen Town Musicians, based on the fairy tale by the Brothers Grimm.
J A N U A R Y	1	Serf 2 Son of a Rich 2	Холоп 2	Director: Klim Shipenko; Cast: Miloš Biković, Aglaya Tarasova, Aleksandr Samoylenko, Ivan Okhlobystin, Maria Mironova, Natalya Rogozhkina, Pavel Derevyanko, Oleg Komarov	Central Partnership / Yellow, Black and White / Russia-1 / START Studio / Mem Media; It is the sequel to the 2019 film Serf.
J A N U A R Y	18	Air	Воздух	Director: Aleksei German Jr. Cast: Anastasia Talyzina, Aglaya Tarasova, Kristina Lapshina, Elena Lyadova, Oleg Grinchenko, Anton Shagin, Kristina Isaykina-Berger	National Media Group Film Distribution / AMedia / Channel One / MetraFilms / SAGa / Kinoprime Foundation
F E B R U A R Y	1	I am a Bear	Я — медведь	Director: Kirill Kemnits; Cast: Nikita Kologrivyy, Agata Muceniece, Dmitry Kalikhov	"Karro" ("KaroRental") Film Distribution Company; A family gets a teddy bear who brings joy and chaos into the family's life.
F E B R U A R Y	14	Ice 3	Лёд 3	Director: Yuri Khmelnitsky; Cast: Alexander Petrov, Mariya Aronova, Anna Savranskaya, Stepan Belozerov, Sergey Lavygin	National Media Group Film Distribution / Vodorod Film Company / Art Pictures Studio; This is an unlicensed sequel to Ice (2018) and Ice 2 (2020).
F E B R U A R Y	14	Secret Attraction	Тайное влечение	Director: Stasya Venkova; Cast: Maria Yanycheva, Daria Balabanova, Mindaugas Papinigis	
F E B R U A R Y	14	The Summer of Our Love	Между нами лето	Director: Yuri Sharov; Cast: Vlad Prokhorov, Anfisa Chernykh, Pavel Maykov	Central Partnership / Decaf Media; A romantic musical retro comedy about first love, which helps you find yourself and your place in life.
F E B R U A R Y	22	Commander	Командир	Director: Aleksandr Guryanov; Cast: Kirill Zaytsev, Artyom Tkachenko, Valery Barinov	"Karro" Film Distribution / EGO Production
M A R C H	7	Adam & Eve	Адам и Ева	Director: Ilya Farfell; Cast: Polina Maksimova, Dmitry Chebotaryov	Central Partnership / Producer center "Gorad"; Romantically, the last two people on the planet don't like each other at all.
M A R C H	7	Love at Second Sight	Любовь со второго взгляда	Director: Olzhas Nurbay; Cast: Aleksandr Sokolovsky, Ksenia Teplova, Miloš Biković, Regina Todorenko, Sharip Serik, Anara Batyrkhan, Safia Dursunova	National Media Group Film Distribution / Yellow, Black and White / START Studio / 1ON Studios / Epicentrum; A romantic comedy-drama about a married couple experiencing a relationship crisis who try to find a solution to their problems in a virtual dating application.
M A R C H	7	Onegin	Онегин	Director: Sarik Andreasyan; Cast: Viktor Dobronravov, Denis Prytkov, Yelizaveta Moryak, Tatyana Sabinova	"Cinema Atmosphere" Film Distribution / K.B.A. (transl. "Andreasyan Brothers Film Company"); Historical film adaptation of the novel of the same name in poems by Alexander Pushkin.
M A R C H	14	Frau	Фрау	Director: Lyubov Mulmenko; Cast: Vadik Korolev, Elizaveta Yankovskaya, Inga Oboldina	"Pioner" Film Distribution / Forrest Film
M A R C H	21	The Flying Ship	Летучий корабль	Director: Ilya Uchitel; Cast: Aleksandr Metyolkin, Ksenia Traister, Andrey Burkovsky, Polina Gagarina, Leonid Yarmolnik, Fyodor Dobronravov	"Our Cinema" Film Distribution / Soyuzmultfilm / Rock Films; The musical film based on the Russian folk tale of the same name, it is a live-action remake of Garri Bardin's 1979 Soviet animated short film The Flying Ship.
M A R C H	28	Extraordinary	Ненормальный	Director: Ilya Malanin; Cast: Aleksandr Yatsenko, Illarion Marov	Central Partnership / Kinoslovo; Inspired by true events, the story of a boy who fought a congenital disease through music.
M A R C H	28	Hoffmann’s Fairy Tales	Сказки Гофмана	Director: Tina Barkalaya; Cast: Ekaterina Vilkova, Yevgeny Tsyganov	National Media Group Film Distribution; A timid Muscovite with low self-esteem enters the world of cinema and becomes a hand double.

Opening		Title	Russian title	Cast and crew	Details
A P R I L	4	Goblin	Домовой	Director: Andrey Zagidullin; Cast: Vasilisa Nemtsova, Oleg Chugunov, Vitali Kishchenko, Natalia Vdovina, Roza Khairullina	"Our Cinema" Film Distribution; A fantasy horror film about teenagers facing ancient otherworldly forces.
A P R I L	4	Umalta Gold	Золото Умальты	Director: Andrey Bogatyrev; Cast: Aleksandr Samoylenko, Artyom Tkachenko, Aleksey Shevchenkov, Sofya Ernst, Pavel Derevyanko, Yevgeny Antropov	"Karro" Film Distribution / Studio Lendoc; A Western about the search for stolen gold, an ostern film based on real events.
A P R I L	11	Reflection of Darkness	Отражение тьмы	Director: Serik Beiseu; Cast: Angelina Pakhomova, Viktor Mikhailov, Polina Davydova, Anton Rival	National Media Group Film Distribution / KD Studios
A P R I L	18	One Hundred Years Ahead	Сто лет тому вперёд	Director: Aleksandr Andryushchenko; Cast: Daria Vereshchagina, Mark Eidelstein, Kirill Mitrofanov, Alexander Petrov, Yura Borisov, Fyodor Bondarchuk	Central Partnership / Art Pictures Studio / Vodorod Film Company; The film Guest from the Future is based on the science fiction story of the One Hundred Years Ahead (ru) by Kir Bulychev from the cycle about Alisa Selezneva.
A P R I L	25	Suvorovets 1944	Суворовец 1944	Director: Denis Kazantsev; Cast: Vsevolod Kazantsev	"Lux Cinema" Film Distribution / Kraski; A teenager at the Suvorov School in 1944, based on books by Novosibirsk authors about life in the Novosibirsk region during the Second World War.
M A Y	9	The Black Notes	Семь чёрных бумаг	Director: Anatoly Koliev; Cast: Zita Latsoeva, Maksim Karaev	National Media Group Film Distribution / START Studio; A war drama inspired by a story by South Ossetian writer Mikhail Bulkata.
M A Y	16	7 Days, 7 Nights (2024 film)	7 дней, 7 ночей	Director: Hayk Kbeyan; Cast: Sergey Marin, Zoya Berber, Egor Nikolaenko, Sofya Petrova	National Media Group Film Distribution / All Media Company / K.B.A. / PGG Films / START Studio
M A Y	18	The Fiery Fox	Огненный лис	Director: Dmitry Shpilenok	"Karro" Film Distribution / Shpilenok Film Company; An adventure documentary about the life of the little fox Veter, who lives in a nature reserve in Kamchatka.
M A Y	23	Major Grom: The Game	Майор Гром: Игра	Director: Oleg Trofim; Cast: Tikhon Zhiznevsky, Aleksandr Seteykin, Aleksei Maklakov, Lyubov Aksyonova, Sergei Goroshko, Dmitry Chebotaryov, Matvey Lykov, Olga Sutulova, Andrey Trushin	Central Partnership; Major Grom 2: The Game is a sequel to Oleg Trofim's superhero action film Major Grom: Plague Doctor, created based on the comic book series of the same name produced by Bubble Studios.
J U N E	6	Pushkin and… Mikhailovskoye. Beginning	Пушкин и... Михайловское. Начало	Director: Ekaterina Gavryushkina	"CinemaTime" Film Distribution / Mukha Studio; A full-length animated film dedicated to the 225th anniversary of the birth of A. S. Pushkin.
J U N E	13	Spell. Whispers of Witches	Заклятье. Шепот ведьм	Director: Serik Beyseu; Cast: Arthur Beschastny, Maryana Spivak, Sofya Shidlovskaya, Igor Grabuzov, Sergey Safronov	National Media Group Film Distribution / KD Studios; A mystical horror film about an investigator who has to unravel the case of missing teenagers in a remote village by meeting with an otherworldly entity.
J U N E		My Favorite Champion	Мой любимый чемпион	Director: Aleksandr Danilov; Cast: Vasilisa Korostyshevskaya, Ekaterina Vilkova, Lyudmila Artemeva, Ilya Lyubimov, Egor Beroev, Oleg Savostyuk	"Our Cinema" Film Distribution / AP Entertainment / Amadeus Kino; A family adventure drama about the amazing friendship between a girl and a horse.

Opening		Title	Russian title	Cast and crew	Details
		Driver-Oligarch	Водитель-олигарх	Director: Aleksey Pimanov; Cast: Pavel Priluchny, Aleksey Chadov, Olga Pogodina, Stanislav Duzhnikov, Dmitry Khrustalyov	"Cinema Atmosphere" Film Distribution / Pimanov and partners A gambling rich man gets a job as a driver for a bitch actress, this is a comedy film.
A U G U S T	1	Let Me Out	Выпусти меня	Director: Mikhail Konstantinov; Cast: Vladimir Verevochkin, Leonid Basov, Pavel Basov	"Our Cinema" Film Distribution / Fresh Film; A mystical thriller about the mysterious disappearance of a boy during a hike.
A U G U S T	8	My Wild Friend	Мой дикий друг	Director: Anna Kurbatova; Cast: Elisey Chuchilin, Yuliya Aleksandrova, Yuri Kolokolnikov, Maxim Shchyogolev	"Our Cinema" Film Distribution / Smart Film / Interfest / Propeller Production / Sverdlovsk Film Studio; According to the creators, the story was inspired by the popular fairy tale The Little Prince.
A U G U S T	8	Unit of Society	Ячейка общества	Director: Alyona Zvantsova; Cast: Anastasiya Krasovskaya, Kuzma Kotrelev, Gerda Pugacheva, Semyon Shkalikov	Must See Magic Film / Forza Film / Vita Aktiva; A drama about a young family and marital values.
A U G U S T	15	Choose Me	Выбери меня	Director: Kirill Klepalov, Denis Kuklin; Cast: Anastasiya Ukolova, Kuzma Saprykin, Shamil Mukhamedov, Anna Ardova, Nikolai Dobrynin	National Media Group Film Distribution / Kakugodno Production / All Media Company / Pervoe Kino Film Company / Sverdlovsk Film Studio / START Studio; A romantic comedy about a grown-up girl who tries to resist her mother's guardianship.
A U G U S T	29	Moonzy: Homecoming	Лунтик. Возвращение домой	Director: Konstantin Bronzit; Voice cast: Anna Slynko, Yuliya Zorkina, Oleg Kulikovich, Anatoly Petrov	VLG.FILM / CTB Film Company / Melnitsa Animation Studio; An animated film that is a continuation of the 2006 animated television series Luntik.
A U G U S T	29	Teenagers: First Love	Подростки: Первая любовь	Director: Svyatoslav Podgayevsky; Cast: Aleksey Onezhen, Aleksandra Tikhonova, Andrey Parkhomenko, Grigory Stolbov	National Media Group Film Distribution / Forza Film / QS Films; A nostalgic Russian musical about growing up in the nineties.
S E P T E M B E R	5	Look at Me	Смотри на меня!	Director: Vladimir Grammatikov; Cast: Alexandra Ursuliak, Semyon Shkalikov	Central Partnership / МВФильм; The story of a large family who, in the post-war years, travels in a freight car from Sverdlovsk to Moscow in the hope of finding their missing father.
S E P T E M B E R	5	The Lost	Затерянные	Director: Roman Karimov; Cast: Egor Koreshkov, Nikita Kologrivyy	National Media Group Film Distribution / QS Films / All Media Company / START Studio; Mystical thriller. Four guys end up in a mysterious town from which there is no escape.
S E P T E M B E R	12	Between Us	Между нами	Director: Anario Mamedov; Cast: Fedor Fedotov, Vitaliya Korniyenko, Darya Petrichenko, Yan Tsapnik, Mark Bogatyryov	Cinema Park Distribution / Berg Sound
S E P T E M B E R	12	Love is Evil	Любовь зла	Director: Denis Gulyar, Gayk Asatryan; Cast: Nikita Kologrivyy, Katerina Kovalchuk, Dmitry Vlaskin	"Cinema Atmosphere" Film Distribution / K.B.A. / ivi A comedy about an unlucky burglar who finds himself in the wrong place at the wrong time.
S E P T E M B E R	12	Vera	Вера	Director: Irina Volkova; Cast: Viktoriya Tolstoganova, Olga Sutulova, Aleksey Rozin, Timofey Timkov, Polina Merkuryeva	"Cinema Atmosphere" Film Distribution / Gorky Film Studios; A film based on the story by Galina Shcherbakova "You Never Dreamed of It".
S E P T E M B E R	19	Mom is 17 Again	Маме снова 17	Director: Anna Kurbatova; Cast: Svetlana Khodchenkova, Ekaterina Channova	National Media Group Film Distribution / Smart Film / All Media Company / START Studio
S E P T E M B E R	26	The Belyakovs on Vacation	Беляковы в отпуске	Director: Aleksandr Nazarov; Cast: Sergei Svetlakov, Svetlana Listova, Aleksandr Novikov	Central Partnership / Sverdlovsk / TNT; Sergey Belyakov from Taganrog, who loves talking to the TV, is going on vacation with his family - a full-length spin-off of the sketch show Nasha Russia.
S E P T E M B E R	26	Masculine Word	Мужское слово	Director: Sarik Andreasyan; Cast: Pavel Priluchny, Mark Andreasyan, Yuri Tsurilo, Nikolai Schreiber, Irina Pegova	"Cinema Atmosphere" Film Distribution / K.B.A. (transl. "Andreasyan Brothers Film Company"); The film's script is based on real events that happened in 2015 in Texas with George Pickering and his son.

Opening		Title	Russian title	Cast and crew	Details
O C T O B E R	3	The Earth Speaks!	Говорит Земля!	Director: Yevgeny Korchagin; Cast: Anton Filipenko, Irina Gorbacheva, Yelena Podkaminskaya, Gosha Kutsenko	"Karro" Film Distribution / Infiniti Content; Eco-comedy film
O C T O B E R	3	The Formula for Water	Формула воды	Director: Artyom Minakov; Voice cast: Yulia Dovganishina, Andrey Lyovin, Sergei Garmash, Aleksey Kolgan	"Cinema Atmosphere" Film Distribution / Magic Factory Animation / Soyuzmultfilm; A fantastic animated film about a girl living on a planet without drinking water.
O C T O B E R	10	Hands Up!	Руки вверх!	Director: Askar Uzabaev; Cast: Vlad Prokhorov, Ilya Rus, Sergey Zhukov, Aleksey Potekhin	Central Partnership / Kinokompaniya Temp / Ruki vverkh! Production / START Studio / Yellow, Black and White; The musical band of the same name by Sergey Zhukov.
O C T O B E R	24	Alien (2024 film)	Пришелец	Director: Ivan Sosnin; Cast: Maxim Stoyanov, Alyona Miroshnikova	"K24" Film Distribution / Red Pepper Film; A science fiction drama about an encounter with the incomprehensible.
O C T O B E R	24	The Enchanted Tinderbox	Огниво	Director: Aleksandr Voytinskiy; Cast: Roman Evdokimov, Irina Starshenbaum, Antonina Boyko	Central Partnership / CTB Film Company; A family adventure fantasy based on The Tinderbox by Hans Christian Andersen.
O C T O B E R	24	Meet Me Yesterday	Встретимся вчера	Director: Alexander Boguslavsky; Cast: Aglaya Tarasova, Artyom Tkachenko	"Cinema Atmosphere" Film Distribution / K.B.A. A sci-fi comedy about a couple on the verge of divorce who find themselves in a time loop in their own apartment.
O C T O B E R	31	Return of the Parrot Kesha	Возвращение попугая Кеши	Director: Oleg Asadulin; Cast: Nikita Kologrivyy, Oksana Akinshina, Mark Yusef, Roman Kurtsyn, Efim Shifrin	"Karro" Film Distribution
N O V E M B E R	7	Love of the Soviet Union	Любовь Советского Союза	Director: Nikita Vysotsky, Ilya Lebedev; Cast: Angelina Strechina, Roman Vasiliev, Kirill Kuznetsov, Igor Petrenko, Angelina Poplavskaya	Central Partnership / Channel One / Cinema Directorate Studio; The story is about the generation of the 1930s, who had a short-lived happiness and a great trial.
N O V E M B E R	14	Replica	Реплика	Director: Amir Isaev; Cast: Nikita Yefremov, Sofia Lebedeva, Vladislav Tsenev	Ark Pictures / Wink
N O V E M B E R	28	Film No. 8	Киноплёнка № 8	Director: Ilya Khotinenko; Cast: Kristina Asmus, Daniil Vorobyov, Semyon Litvinov, Olrg Garkusha, Valentin Mendelson	Cinema Park Distribution / Vita Aktiva; A mystical thriller about a young woman who tries to find her son, who disappeared under very strange circumstances.
D E C E M B E R	5	Woman from Ural	Уралочка (Uralochka)	Director: Mikhail Raskhodnikov; Cast: Valeriya Astapova, Aleksander Gorbatov	National Media Group Film Distribution / All Media Company / START Studio / Tema Film Company
D E C E M B E R	19	Little Brownie Kuzya	Домовёнок Кузя	Director: Viktor Lakisov; Cast: Sergey Burunov, Garik Kharlamov, Alika Smekhova, Sofiya Petrova, Mark Bogatyryov, Evgenia Malakhova, Alexey Gavrilov	"Cinema Atmosphere" Film Distribution / K.B.A.
D E C E M B E R	26	Ivan Tsarevich and the Gray Wolf 6	Иван Царевич и Серый Волк 6	Director: Darina Schmidt, Konstantin Feoktistov; Voice cast: Nikita Yefremov, Aleksandr Boyarsky	VLG.FILM / Melnitsa Animation Studio; The sixth part of the popular series Ivan Tsarevich and the Gray Wolf (film series)
D E C E M B E R	26	The Last Ronin	Последний ронин	Director: Max Shishkin; Cast: Yuri Kolokolnikov, Diana Enakayeva, Daniil Vorobyov, Tikhon Zhiznevsky, Alexandr Mizev, Maxim Kolesnichenko	Central Partnership / Zoom Production / Okko Studios

=== Cultural Russian films ===
- Altered is a 2024 American science fiction action film written and directed by Timo Vuorensola.
- Anora is a 2024 American comedy drama film written and directed by Sean Baker.
- I.S.S. is a 2024 American science fiction film directed by Gabriela Cowperthwaite.
- Kraven the Hunter is a 2024 American superhero film directed by J. C. Chandor.

== See also ==
- List of Russian films
- List of Russian films of 2025
