= Golden Eagle Award for Best Leading Actress (Russia) =

Annual Russian film award

- Awarded for: Best Leading Actress of the Year
- Country: Russia
- Presented by: National Academy of Motion Pictures Arts and Sciences of Russia
- First award: 2002
- Currently held by: Alexandra Ursuliak in Look at me! (Посмотри на меня!, 2024)
- Website: Official site of the National Academy of Motion Picture Arts and Sciences of Russia

The Golden Eagle Award for Best Leading Actress (Russian: Премия «Золотой Орёл» за лучшую женскую роль в кино) is one of twenty award categories presented annually by the National Academy of Motion Pictures Arts and Sciences of Russia. It is one of the Golden Eagle Awards, which were conceived by Nikita Mikhalkov as a counterweight to the Nika Award established in 1987 by the Russian Academy of Cinema Arts and Sciences.

Each year the members of the academy choose three leading actresses and the film as a perception. The first actress to be awarded was Natalya Gundareva for the film Rostov-Papa. Alexandra Ursuliak in Look at me! (Посмотри на меня!, 2024).

== Nomineess and Awardees ==
Key

Sign	Meaning
†	The international title is not known
**Bold**	Indicates the winner

=== 2000s ===
Year	Actress	International title	Original title	Transliterated title (per BGN/PCGN standard)	Ref(s)
2002	**Natalya Gundareva**	Rostov Daddy	Ростов-папа	Rostov-Papa	
2002	Julia Vysotskaya	House of Fools	Дом дураков	Dom Durakov	
2002	Tuyara Svinoboeva	River	Река	Reka	
2003	**Irina Pegova**	The Stroll	Прогулка	Progulka	
2003	Renata Litvinova	Sky. Plane. Girl	Небо. Самолёт. Девушка	Nebo. Camolyot. Devushka	
2003	Viktoriya Tolstoganova	Magnetic Storms	Магнитные бури	Magnitnye Buri	
2004	**Alyona Babenko**	A Driver for Vera	Водитель для Веры	Voditel' dlya Very	
2004	Anna Mikhalkova	Our Own	Свои	Svoi	
2004	Natalya Surkova	Our Own	Свои	Svoi	
2005	**Alla Demidova**	The Tuner	Настройщик	Nastroyshchik	
2005	Alisa Freindlich	On Upper Maslovka Street	На Верхней Масловке	Na Verkhney Maslovke	
2005	Chulpan Khamatova	Garpastum	Гарпастум	Garpastum	
2006	**Anna Mikhalkova**	Relations	Связь	Svyaz	
2006	Renata Litvinova	It Doesn't Hurt Me	Мне не больно	Mne ne Bol'no	
2006	Yevgeniya Simonova	Ellipsis	Многоточие	Mnogotochie	
2007	**Yevgenia Dobrovolskaya**	Actress	Артистка	Artistka	
2007	Kseniya Kutepova	Travelling with Pets	Путешествие с домашними животными	Puteshestvie c Domashnimi Zhivotnymi	
2007	Mariya Shalayeva	Mermaid	Русалка	Rusalka	
2008	**Kseniya Rappoport**	Yuri's Day	Юрьев день	Yurev Den	
2008	Darya Moroz	Live and Remember	Живи и помни	Shchivi i Pomni	
2008	Chulpan Khamatova	Paper Soldier	Бумажный солдат	Bumazhnyy Soldat	
2009	**Natalya Negoda**	Tambourine, Drum	Бубен, барабан	Buren, Baraban	
2009	Svetlana Kryuchkova	Bury Me Behind the Baseboard	Похороните меня за плинтусом	Pokhoronite Menya za Plintusom	
2009	Chulpan Khamatova	The Event	Событие	Sobytie	

=== 2010s ===
Year	Actress	International title	Original title	Transliterated title (per BGN/PCGN standard)	Ref(s)
2010	**Anjorka Strechel**	The Edge	Край	Kray	
2010	Ekaterina Klimova	We Are from the Future 2	Мы из будущего 2	My iz Budushchevo 2	
2010	Oksana Fandera	About Luboff	Про любоff	Pro Lyuboff	
2011	**Kseniya Rappoport**	Two Days	Два дня	Dva dnya	
2011	Nadezhda Markina	Elena	Елена	Elena	
2011	Oksana Fandera	Brothel Lights	Огни притона	Ogni pritona	
2012	**Anna Mikhalkova**	Love with an Accent	Любовь с акцентом	Lyubov s aktsentom	
2012	Renata Litvinova	Rita's Last Fairy Tale	Последняя сказка Риты	Poslednaya skazka Rity	
2012	Roza Khairullina	The Horde	Орда	Orda	
2013	**Elena Lyadova**	The Geographer Drank His Globe Away	Географ глобус пропил	Geograf globus propil	
2013	Yuliya Aleksandrova	Kiss Them All!	Горько!	Gorko!	
2013	Svetlana Ivanova	Legend No. 17	Легенда No. 17	Legenda No. 17	
2014	**Elena Lyadova**	Leviathan	Левиафан	Leviafan	
2014	Darya Moroz	The Fool	Дурак	Durak	
2014	Yulia Peresild	Weekend	Weekend [Уик-энд]	Weekend [Uik-end]	
2015	**Yulia Peresild**	Battle for Sevastopol	Битва за Севастополь	Bitva za Sevastopol'	
2015	Mariya Aronova	Battalion	Батальонъ	Batal'on"	
2015	Renata Litvinova	About Love	Про Любовь	Pro Lyubov'	
2016	**Julia Vysotskaya**	Paradise	Рай	Ray	
2016	Viktoriya Isakova	The Student	Ученик	Uchenik	
2016	Kseniya Rappoport	The Queen of Spades	Дама Пик	Dama Pik	
2017	**Irina Gorbacheva**	Arrhythmia	Аритмия	Aritmiya	
2017	Alisa Freindlich	Bolshoi	Большой	Bol'shoy	
2017	Marina Neyolova	Thawed Carp	Карп отмороженный	Karp Otmorozhennyy	
2018	**Aglaya Tarasova**	Ice	Лёд	Lod	
2018	Marta Kozlova	Anna's War	Война Анны	Voyna Anny	
2018	Alyona Chekhova	Never Say Goodbye	Прощаться не будем	Proshchat'sya ne Budem	
2019	**Viktoria Miroshnichenko**	Beanpole	Дылда	Dylda	
2019	Stasya Miloslavskaya	The Bull	Бык	Byk	
2019	Irina Starshenbaum	T-34	T-34	T-34	

=== 2020s ===
Year	Actress	International title	Original title	Transliterated title (per BGN/PCGN standard)	Ref(s)
2020	**Olga Ozollapinya**	A Siege Diary	Блокадный дневник	Blokadnyy Dnevnik	
2020	Julia Vysotskaya	Dear Comrades!	Дорогие товарищи!	Dorogiye Tovarishchi!	
2020	Stasya Miloslavskaya	Streltsov	Стрельцов	Strel'tsov	
2021	**Mariya Aronova**	Couple from the Future	Пара из будущего	Para iz budushchego	
2021	Anna Mikhalkova	House Arrest	Дело	Delo	
2021	Irina Starshenbaum	Hostel	Общага	Obschaga	
2022	**Irina Starshenbaum**	Intensive Care	Здоровый человек	Zdorovyy chelovek	
2022	Elena Erbakova	Land of Legends	Сердце Пармы	Serdce Parmy	
2022	Darya Zhovner	First Oscar	Первый Оскар	Pervyj Oskar	
2023	**Anna Mikhalkova**	Anna's feelings	Чувства Анны	Chuvstva Anny	
2023	Lubov Konstantinova	Pravednik	Праведник	Pravednik	
2023	Yulia Peresild	The Challenge	Вызов	Vyzov	
2024	**Alexandra Ursuliak**	Look at me!	Смотри на меня!	Smotri na menya!	
2024	Angelina Strechina	Love of the Soviet Union	Любовь Советского Союза	Lyubov’ Sovetskogo Soyuza	
2024	Angelina Strechina	Air	Воздух	Air	

== Gallery ==
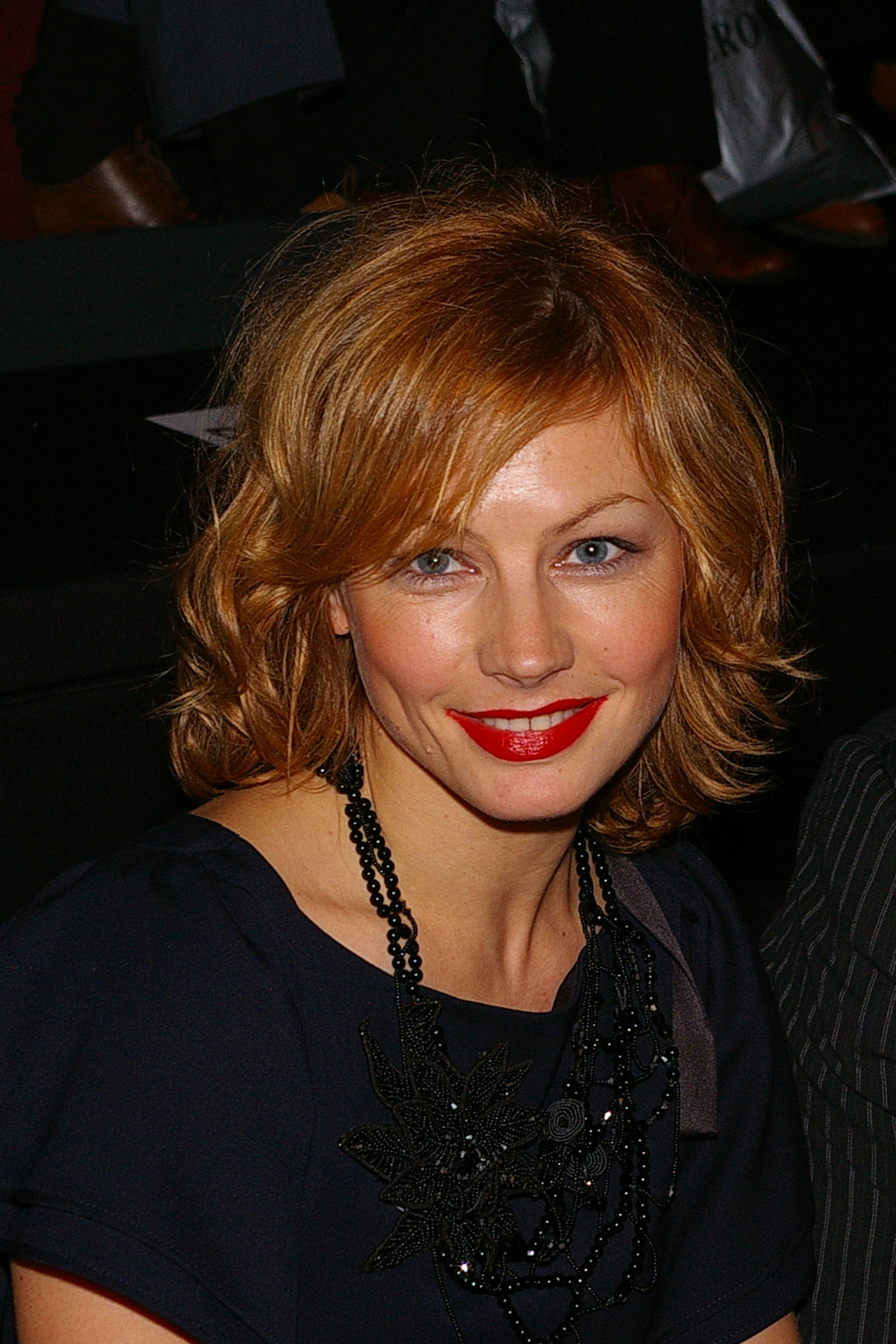
Alyona Babenko

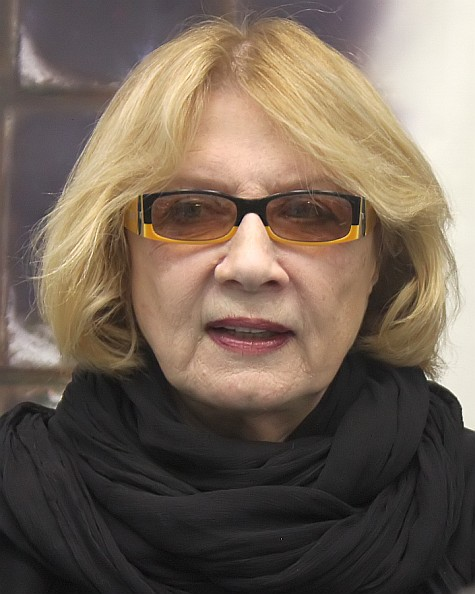
Alla Demidova

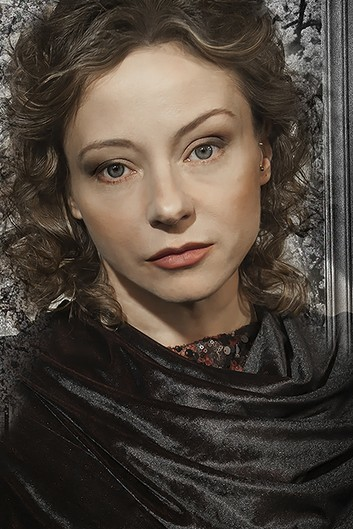
Yevgenia Dobrovolskaya

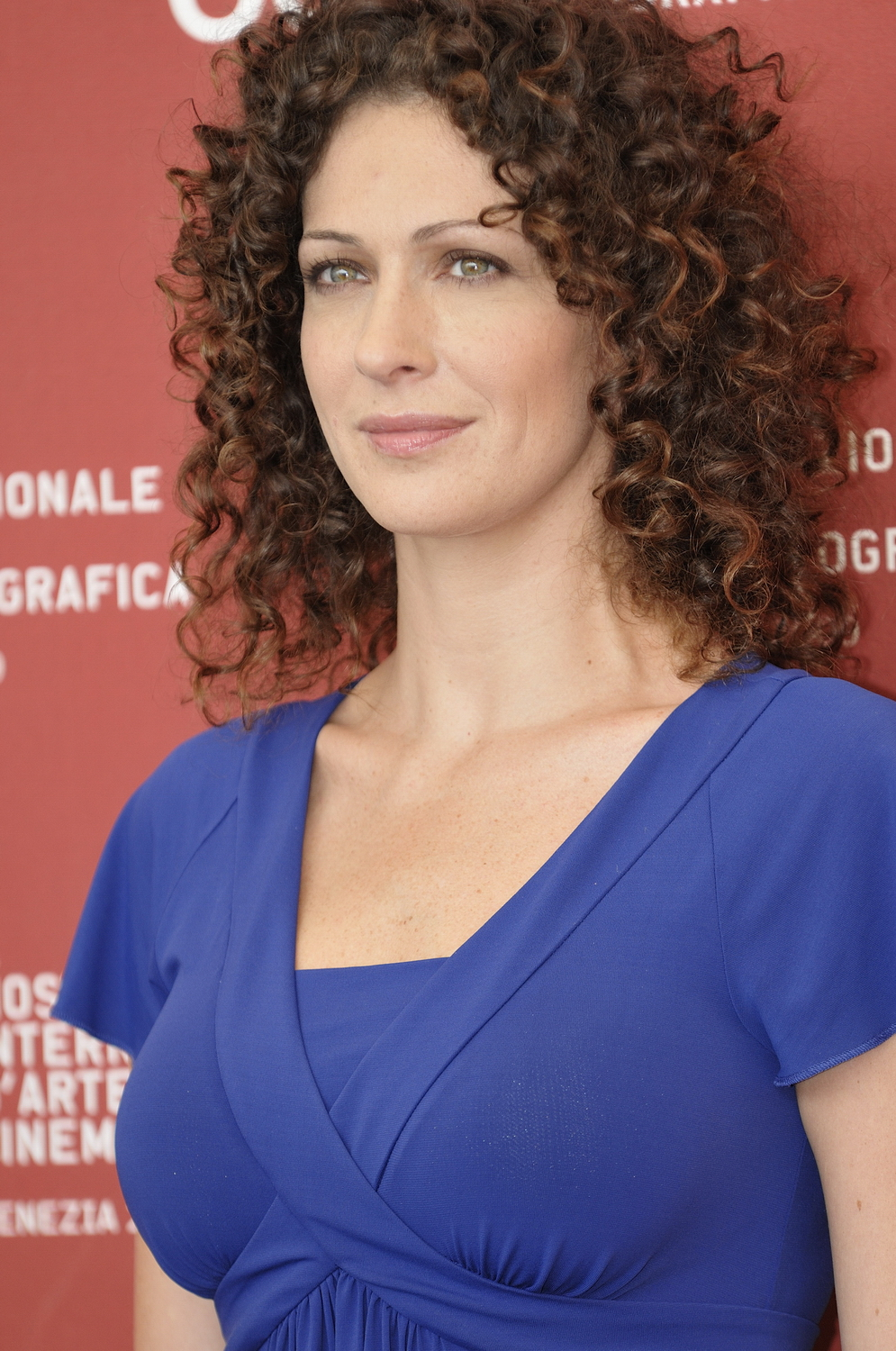
Kseniya Rappoport

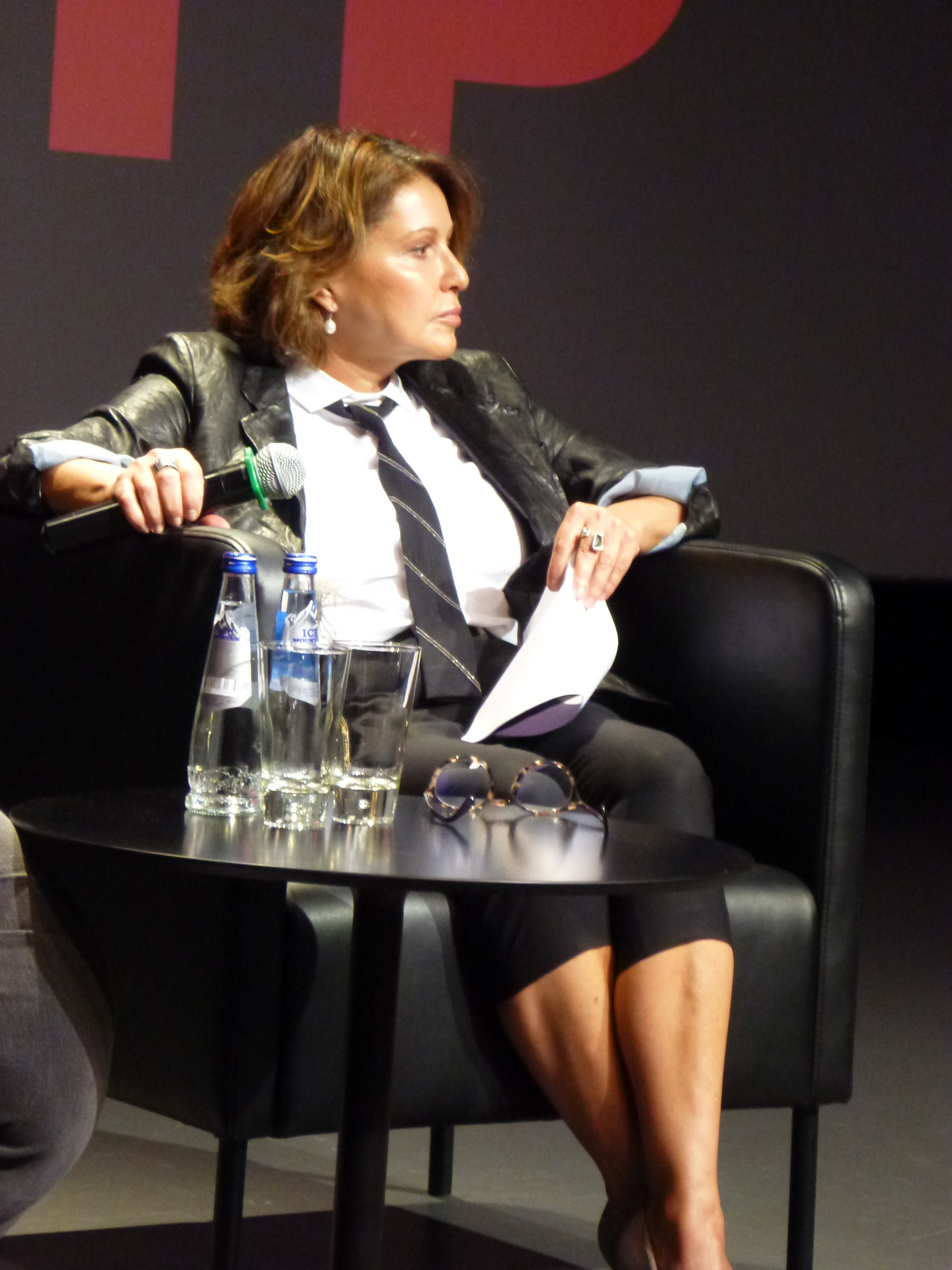
Natalya Negoda

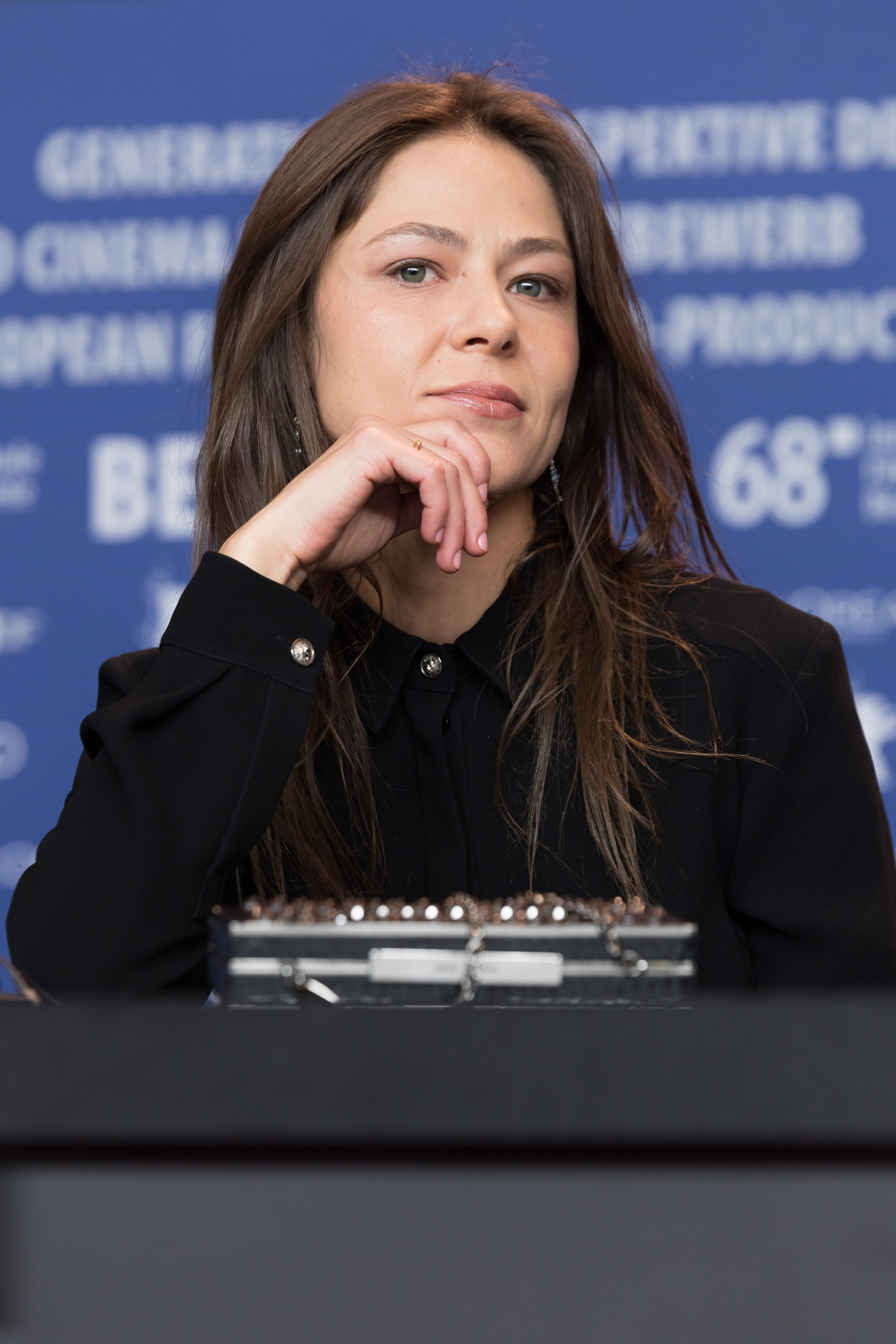
Elena Lyadova

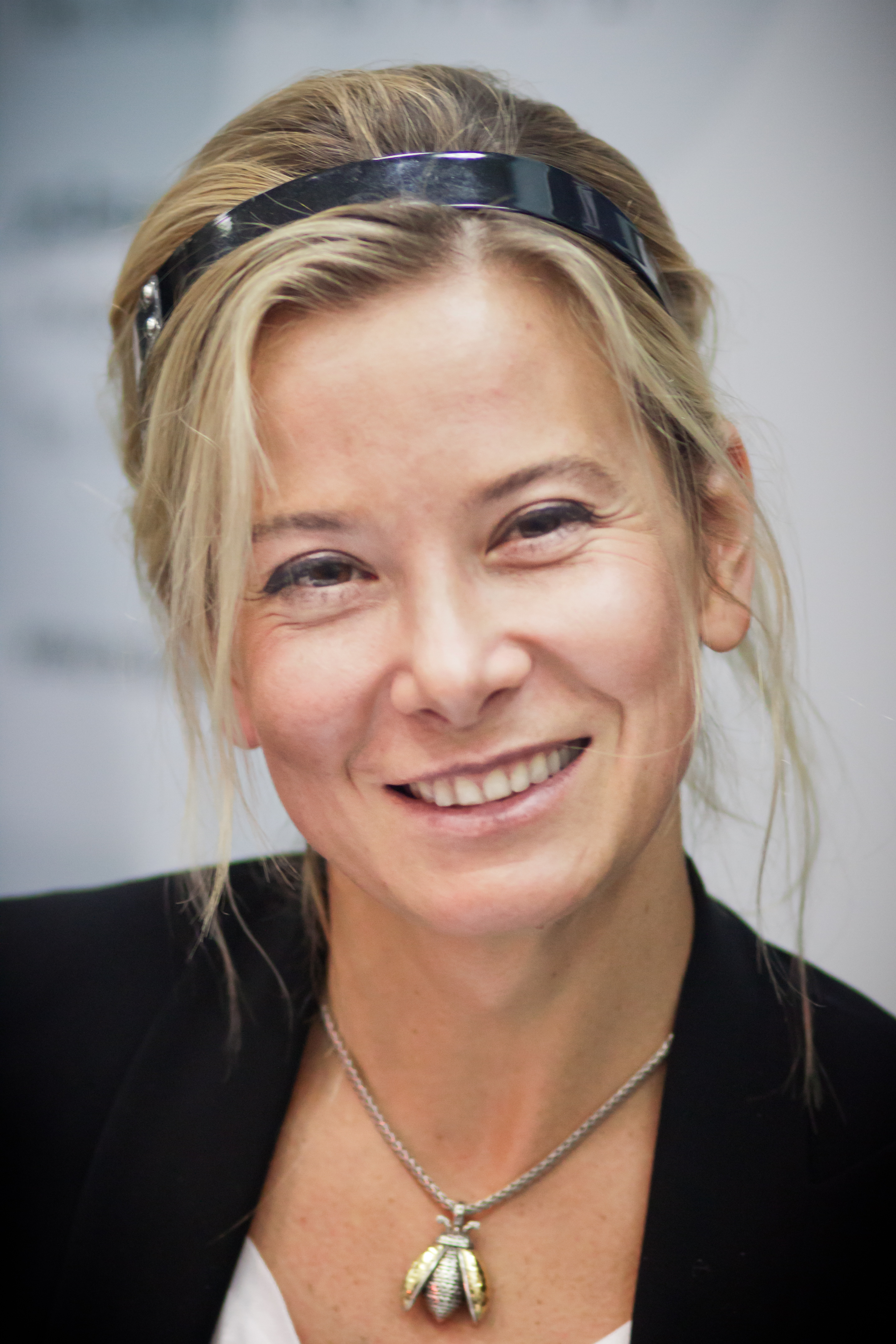
Julia Vysotskaya

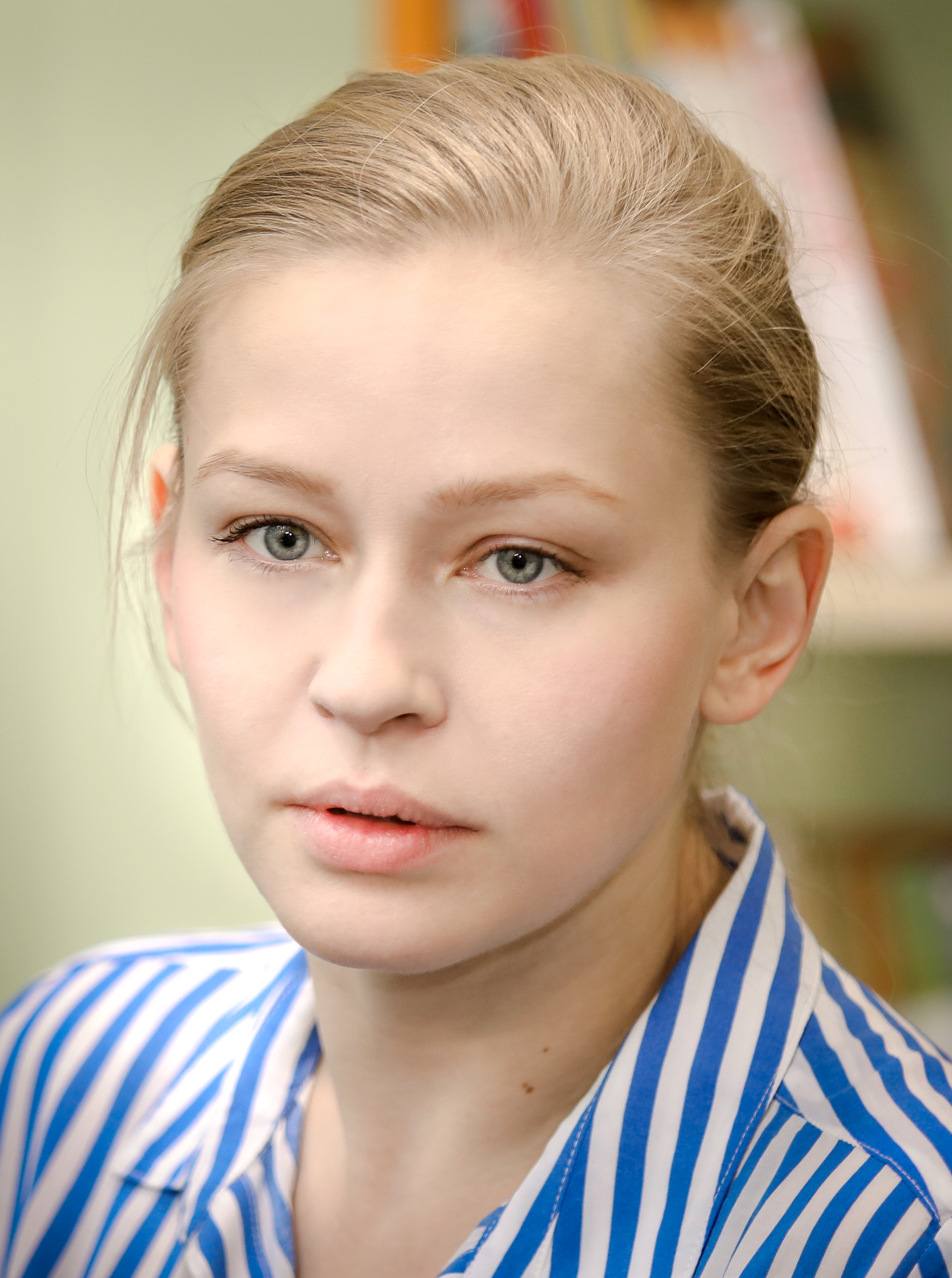
Yulia Peresild

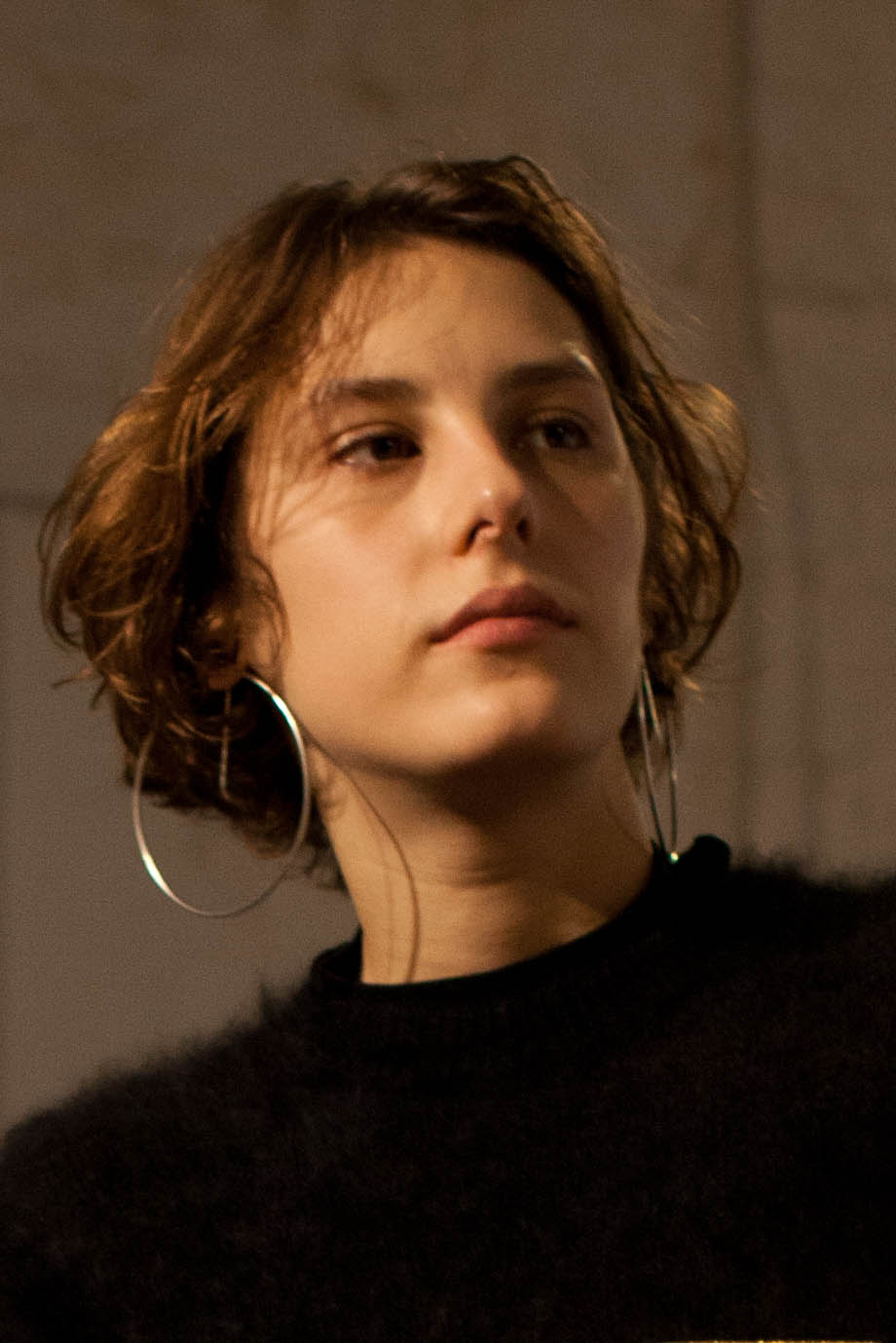
Irina Gorbacheva
