= Ice 3 =

- Directed by: Yuri Khmelnitsky
- Written by: Andrey Zolotarev; Aksinya Borisova; Aleksandr Andryushchenko; Oleg Malovichko
- Produced by: Fyodor Bondarchuk; Denis Baglay; Mikhail Vrubel; Aleksandr Andryushchenko; Anton Zlatopolsky (ru); Olga Filipuk; Mikhail Kitaev; Vadim Smirnov; Irina Varlamova; Pavel Gorin; Elena Bystrova; Antonina Li; Anna Malina; Darya Chigirinova; Ekaterina Li; Sergey Bolshakov
- Starring: Alexander Petrov; Mariya Aronova; Anna Savranskaya; Stepan Belozyorov; Sergey Lavygin; Elena Nikolaeva; Vitaliya Korniyenko; Aglaya Tarasova
- Cinematography: Andrey Ivanov
- Edited by: Aleksandr Puzyryov; Aleksey Starchenko
- Music by: Oleg Karpachev
- Production companies: Art Pictures Studio; Vodorod Film Company; Russia-1; Plus Studio; STS Media; Cinema Foundation
- Distributed by: National Media Group Film Distribution
- Release dates: February 13, 2024 (Karo 11 October); February 14, 2024 (Russia)
- Running time: 134 minutes
- Country: Russia
- Language: Russian
- Budget: ₽500 million
- Box office: ₽1.855 billion; $20.6 million

Ice 3 (Russian: Лёд 3, romanized: Lyod 3) is a 2024 Russian musical romantic drama sports film directed by Yuri Khmelnitsky. It stars Alexander Petrov and Mariya Aronova, they were also joined by Anna Savranskaya as Nadya grew up and dreamed of becoming a figure skater, like her mother, which her father categorically dislikes. This is the third part of the Russian trilogy, and, as stated by the creators, the final one.

The film is a continuation of the stories Ice (2018 film) and Ice 2 (2020 film), and its predecessors, it became a blockbuster and grossed more than 1.855 billion rubles, becoming a box office success, and also received positive reviews from critics.

Ice 3 was theatrically released in Russia on Valentine's Day, February 14, 2024, by National Media Group Film Distribution.

== Plot ==
The film follows the coming-of-age story of Nadia, the daughter of Alexander Gorin, as she navigates key moments in her life leading up to her 18th birthday. After her father suffers a career-ending injury, Nadia refuses to give up on her dreams of becoming a hockey player. Despite her father’s prohibition against training due to her injuries, she secretly trains with Sergei Orlov, who helps her prepare for a prestigious award her mother once desired.

Initially at odds, Alexander eventually approves of Nadia and Sergei's relationship after recognizing Sergei’s serious intentions. In the end, the four gather for a celebratory meal, where Nadia and Sergei announce their plan to live together, alongside Alexander and Irina Sergeevna, who has triumphed over her illness.

== Cast ==
- Alexander Petrov as Alexander 'Sasha' Gorin, a hockey player, team coach
- Mariya Aronova as Irina Shatalina, Nadya's coach
- Anna Savranskaya as Nadezhda 'Nadya' Gorina
  - Vitaliya Korniyenko as Nadezhda 'Nadya' Gorina in childhood
- Stepan Belozyorov as Sergey Orlov, a hockey player from Moscow, Nadya's boyfriend
- Sergey Lavygin as Sergey Ivanovich, team coach, deputy president of the club
- Elena Nikolaeva as Tamara Bezhanova, a coach from Moscow
- Sergey Belyaev as Reutov, a hockey player
- Vasily Kopeikin as Simonov, a hockey player
- Veronika Zhilina as Albina, a figure skater
- Nikolai Kreivis as Grisha, cameraman
- Evgeniya Shipova as nurse Shatalina, a physician at the hockey club
- Irina Ulanovskaya as Alevtina
- Aglaya Tarasova as Nadya Gorina's mother

== Production ==
=== Filming ===
Principal photography began in March 2023 on Lake Baikal, at a time when the ice is crystal clear and there are no people within a kilometer radius. The main screenwriter of the film was Andrey Zolotarev, and the general producer was Fyodor Bondarchuk. The film's budget is 500 million rubles.

== Release ==
=== Marketing ===
Ice 3 premiered at the Karo 11 October cinema center on New Arbat Avenue in Moscow on February 13, 2024, and the release in the Russian Federation on February 14 by National Media Group Film Distribution.

== Reception ==
=== Box office ===
In the first ten days of release, the film collected one billion rubles.
