= Kseniya Rappoport =

Russian actress (born 1974)

- Ксения Раппопорт
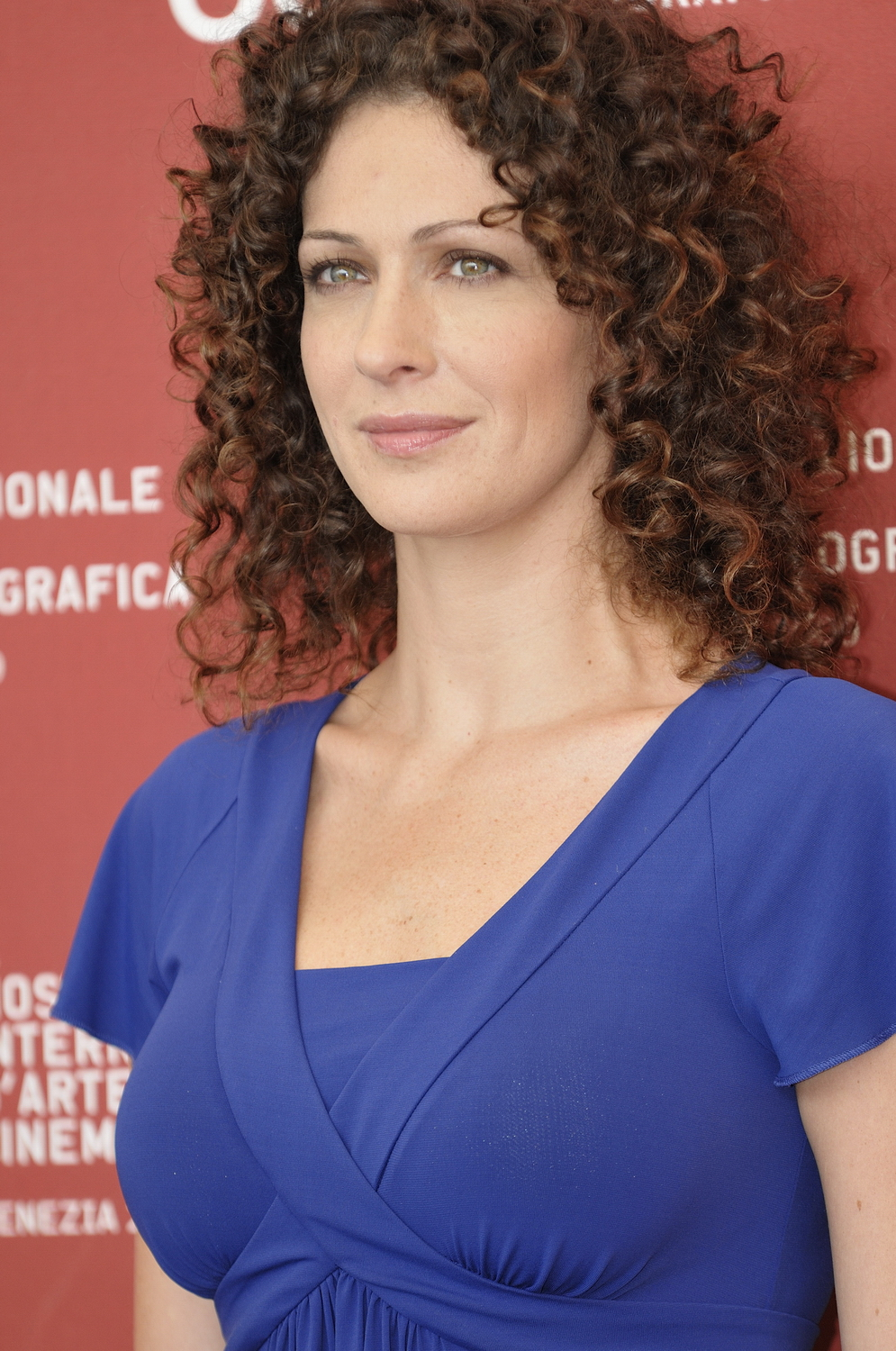
- Rappoport at the 2009 Venice Film Festival
- Born: 25 March 1974 (age 52); Leningrad, RSFSR, USSR
- Occupation: Actress
- Years active: 1991–present
- Title: People's Artist of Russia (2015)
- Spouse(s): Victor Tasarov (divorced) Dmitriy Borisov (m. 2016)
- Partner: Yuri Kolokolnikov (until 2014)
- Children: Aglaya, Sofia

Kseniya Aleksandrovna Rappoport (Russian: Ксе́ния Алекса́ндровна Раппопо́рт; born 25 March 1974) is a Russian actress. She graduated in 2000 from Saint Petersburg Academy of Theatrical Arts and was immediately invited to join the Maly Drama Theatre. She played Nina Zarechnaya in The Seagull, Elena in Uncle Vania, and Sonia in La doppia ora.

She has appeared in films and TV series such as Streets of Broken Lights, Baron, Anna Karenina, Nicholas II (Germany), The Russian Bride, National Security Agent, Empire under Attack, Calendula Flowers, Prokofiev (Germany), Get Thee Out, Criminal Petersburg, Homicide, and I Pay Up Front and My Wife's Romance (France). She starred in the Italian films La sconosciuta (The Unknown Woman; 2006), L'uomo che ama (2008) and in the Golden Lion nominated movie La doppia ora (2009), for which she won the Volpi Cup for Best Actress at the 66th Venice Film Festival.

== Biography ==
Rappoport was born in Leningrad, Russian SFSR, Soviet Union (now Saint Petersburg, Russia) in a Jewish family. She made her debut in cinema at the age of 16 years, while the decision to become an actress was influenced by her role in the film Get Thee Out.

In 2000, she graduated from Saint Petersburg State Theatre Arts Academy (SPbGATI), where she studied in the class VM Filshtinsky and was immediately invited to join the trainee group in St. Petersburg Maly Drama Theater, where she is an actress at the moment. Xenia played Nina Zarechnaya in The Seagull set Lev Dodin in 2001. She also played a girl in "Claustrophobia" (MDT), Elena Andreyevna in Uncle Vanya (Prize "Gold spotlights" in 2003 for Best Actress) and Sofia in Play without Name directed by Lev Dodin in MDT, Jocasta in Oedipus Rex, Beatrice in The Servant of Two Masters and Ismenio in Antigone (State Theatre on Foundry).

In 2008, Rappoport played an opera singer whose son mysteriously disappears in the film Yuri's Day by Kirill Serebrennikov. She won the Best Actress award at the Kinotavr festival, Golden Eagle Awards and at the Russian Guild of Film Critics Awards.

In December 2009, Rappoport was awarded the title Honored Artist of the Russian Federation.

On 27 June 2012, at the 58th International Film Festival in Taormina (Sicily, Italy) Rappoport awarded the prize Golden Lion, founded by the Province of Messina.

In 2012, she was awarded the Golden Eagle Award for her role in film Two Days (2011).

At the 35th Moscow International Film Festival, she was awarded a Stanislavsky Award "For conquest of tops of actor's skill and loyalty to the principles of Stanislavsky school".

In 2013, Rappoport won in the category "Skill actor" (Best Actress) awarded the International Prize of Stanislavsky (2012-2013 theater season) for the role of Lady Milford in the play Intrigue and Love directed by Lev Dodin (MDT Theater of Europe). In 2014 she became the winner of "Top 50 Most famous people of St. Petersburg" in the theater for active work in the Board of Trustees "Children Bella" and the role of Ranevskaya in The Cherry Orchard by Lev Dodin.

In March 2015, she was awarded the prize of the Association of producers of film and television in the field of television movies as Best Actress TV Movie/Series for the role of Olga in Ladoga (Russian TV Series).

She has had a successful acting career abroad and has gained international fame. She starred in Giuseppe Tornatore's Unknown Woman, played along Monica Bellucci in The Man Who Loves, and won Volpi Cup as Best Actress at the Venice Film Festival for The Double Hour.

Currently, Rappoport stays active in theatre. In 2025, she was the lead actress in Dunya Smirnova's play Beyond the Light at the Gesher Theatre in Tel Aviv. In 2026, she starred in the London premiere of Sunset Boulevard, a Gift of Life charity production.

== Personal life ==
Rappoport's father was Jewish, and she has stated that she never hid her Jewish ethnicity.

Rappoport was married to Russian businessman Viktor Tarasov. Their daughter is actress Darya-Aglaya Tarasova who received the 2019 Golden Eagle Award for Best Leading Actress for her role as the figure skater Nadezhda Lapshina in the 2018 Russian language film Ice.

Rappoport later was in relationship with Russian actor Yuri Kolokolnikov, and they have a daughter Sofia, born January 2011.

Her second marriage was to restaurateur Dmitriy Borisov. The couple tied the knot in 2016, but divorced in May 2019.

== Filmography ==
=== Film ===
Year	Title	Role	Notes
1991	Get Thee Out	Sima	
1993	Russian Bride	Kristina	
1997	Anna Karenina	Mariya	
1998	Marigolds in Flower	Yelena	
1999	I'll Pay More!	Natusya	
2005	Kazaroza	Alevtina	
2006	The Unknown Woman	Irena	
2006	Ratatouille	Margo	
2008	Yuri's Day	Lyubov Vasilyeva	
2008	A man who loves	Sara	
2008	Kacheli	Inna Maksimovna	(ru)
2008	Italians	Vera	
2008	The Double Hour	Sonia	
2009	The golden section	Mari	
2009	My Wife's Romance	Amro's wife	
2010	The Father and the Foreigner	Lisa	
2011	Two Days	Masha	(ru)
2011	Gulf Stream Under the Iceberg		
2011	Fairytale.Is	head teacher	(ru)
2012	No hurry	actress Anna Feofanova (short story "Saving the tunnel")	
2011	Raspoutine	Maria Golovina	
2014	Noi 4	Lara	
2014	The Ice Forest	Lana	
2014	The Invisible Boy	Yelena	
2015	Deerest Mother!	Galina, mother Slavika	
2015	Norway	Anna	
2016	The Queen of Spades	Sofia Mayer	
2018	Ice	Nadya Lapshina's mother	
2018	The Invisible Boy - Second Generation	Yelena	
2021	Mama, I'm Home	Tonya	
2021	Na blizkom rasstoyanii	Inga Griner	
2023	The Order of Time		

=== Television ===
Year	Title	Role	Notes
1999	National Security Agent	Tanya	(ru)
1999	Streets of Broken Lights 2	Marina Urbanskaya	
2000–05	Destructive force	wife Sinitsky	
2000	Empire under Attack	Alina	
2001	Gangster Petersburg 3: Antibiotic Collapse	Rachel Dallet	(ru)
2002	On behalf of Baron	Debora	(ru)
2002	Time to love	Nadya	
2002	Knife in the Clouds		
2003	Gangster Petersburg 4: Prisoner	Rachel Dallet	(ru)
2003	Do not quarrel, girls!		
2004	Sissi - Empress rebel	Marie	
2005	The Fall of the Empire	Alina Gorskaya	
2005	Yesenin	Galina Benislavskya	
2005	Citizen of the head 2	Anna Karno	(ru)
2007	Liquidation	Ida	Miniseries
2007	Betrothed-disguised	Olga Gusarova wife Edik	
2007	More important than love	Veronica Vladimirtseva journalist	
2009	Isaev	Lidiya Bosse, singer	(ru)
2012	The White Guard	Elena	
2012	After school	Zhanna Ivanovna, head teacher	(ru)
2013	Ladoga (Russian TV Series)	Olga Kaminskaya	Miniseries
2014	Boatswain Seagull		Miniseries
2017	Mata Hari	Elizabeth Shragmyuller	
2021	Vertinsky	Lidiya Pavlovna	Miniseries
