= The Librarian (TV series) =

- Genre: crime drama; fantasy; detective
- Created by: Ilya Tilkin; Alexander Gryazin
- Directed by: Igor Tverdokhlebov
- Starring: Nikita Yefremov; Evgeniya Dmitrieva; Marina Vorozhishcheva; Andrey Merzlikin; Alexandra Ursuliak
- No. of seasons: 1
- No. of episodes: 8

Production
- Executive producer: Ksenia Sokolova
- Producers: Julia Sumacheva; Vladimir Tyulin; Anatoly Tupitsyn
- Production location: Moscow
- Cinematography: Stanislav Sharkov
- Production companies: National Media Group; WeitMedia

Original release
- Network: REN TV
- Release: 29 June – 17 August 2023

The Librarian (Russian: Библиотекарь, romanized: Bibliotekar) is a 2023 Russian television series directed by Igor Tverdokhlebov based on the novel of the same name by Mikhail Elizarov.

== Plot ==
Aleksei Vyazintsev is a failed actor who dreams of a career in Hollywood. He does not have enough money to fulfill the American dream, so he is interrupted by passing roles, moonlights as an animator and even almost starred in porn. One day he learns that his father, who did not participate in his life at all, is dying under strange circumstances. For the sake of the inheritance, the guy comes to his hometown of Sheronino and suddenly plunges into a very dangerous world, where the locals are united in groups and hunt for magic books of the unknown Soviet writer Gromov. Caught up in a murder, Alexei must learn the truth about his father's mysterious past and find those responsible for his death.

== Cast ==
- Nikita Yefremov as Aleksei Vyazintsev
- Evgeniya Dmitrieva as Margarita Selivanova
- Marina Vorozhishcheva as Tanya
- Andrey Merzlikin as Maxim Vyazintsev
- Mikhail Trukhin as Shulga
- Sergey Epishev as Denis Lutsis
- Igor Zolotovitsky as Lagudov
- Alexandra Ursuliak as Shorokhova
- Karen Badalov as Tsofin
- Viktoria Poltorak as Zhanna Simonyan
- Yola Sanko as Gorn
- Mikhail Troinik as Grisha
- Elena Morozova as Shepchikhina
- Anna Sorokina as mother at a children's party

== Production ==
Filming for the series began in late July 2022. The thriller is produced by the REN TV Channel and the National Media Group. In December 2022 the demo version of the series was leaked to the Network by pirates.

The premiere took place on June 29, 2023 on online services more.tv and Wink.
