= Izvestia =

Russian daily newspaper founded in 1917

Izvestia Известия

- Front page of the Izvestia newspaper from 15 June 2012
- Type: Daily newspaper
- Format: Broadsheet
- Owner: National Media Group
- Publisher: Inews (News Media)
- Editor-in-chief: Sergei Korotyev
- Founded: 13 March 1917; 109 years ago
- Language: Russian
- Headquarters: Begovoy District, Moscow, Russia
- Circulation: 234,500
- ISSN: 0233-4356
- OCLC number: 427395058
- Website: iz.ru

Izvestia (Russian: Известия, romanized: Izvestiya, IPA: [ɪzˈvʲesʲtʲɪjə], "The News") is a daily broadsheet newspaper in Russia. Founded in February 1917, Izvestia, which covered foreign relations, was the organ of the Supreme Soviet of the Soviet Union, disseminating official state propaganda. It is now described as a "national newspaper" of Russia.

The word izvestiya in Russian means "bring news" or "tidings", "herald" (an official messenger bringing news), derived from the verb izveshchat ("to inform", "to notify").

== History ==
=== 1917–1991 ===
Old Izvestia logo. It uses two letters that are no longer used in the Russian language (see Reforms of Russian orthography).

During the Soviet period, while Pravda served as the official mouthpiece of the Communist Party, Izvestia expressed the official views of the Soviet government as published by the Presidium of the Supreme Soviet of the USSR.

Chronology of names

- 1917
  - February: Izvestiya of the Petrograd Soviet of Workers' and Soldiers' Deputies
  - March–August: Izvestiya of the Petrograd Soviet of Workers' and Soldiers' Deputies
  - August–September: Izvestiya of the Central Executive Committee and the Petrograd Soviet of Workers' and Soldiers' Deputies
  - September–October: Izvestiya of the Central Executive Committee of the Soviets of Workers' and Soldiers' Deputies
- 1917–1918: Izvestiya All-Russian Central Executive Committee of the Soviets of Peasants, Workers, Soldiers, and Cossack Deputies and the Petrograd Soviet of Workers and Red Army Deputies
- 1918: Bulletin of the All-Russian Central Executive Committee of the Soviets of Peasants, Workers, Soldiers, and Cossack Deputies and the Moscow Soviet of Workers and Red Army Deputies
- 1918–1923: Bulletin of the All-Russian Central Executive Committee and the Moscow Soviet of Workers and Soldiers’ Deputies
- 1923–1938: Bulletin of the Central Executive Committee of the USSR and the All-Russian Central Executive Committee of the Soviets of Workers, Peasants, Red Army and Cossack Deputies
- 1938–1977: Izvestia of the Soviets of Deputies of the Workers of the USSR
- 1977–1991: Izvestia of the Soviets of People's Deputies of the USSR
- since 1991: Izvestia

The Izvestia Trophy ice hockey tournament was named after the newspaper between 1969 and 1996.

Nedelya was the weekend supplement of Izvestia.

=== 1992–present ===
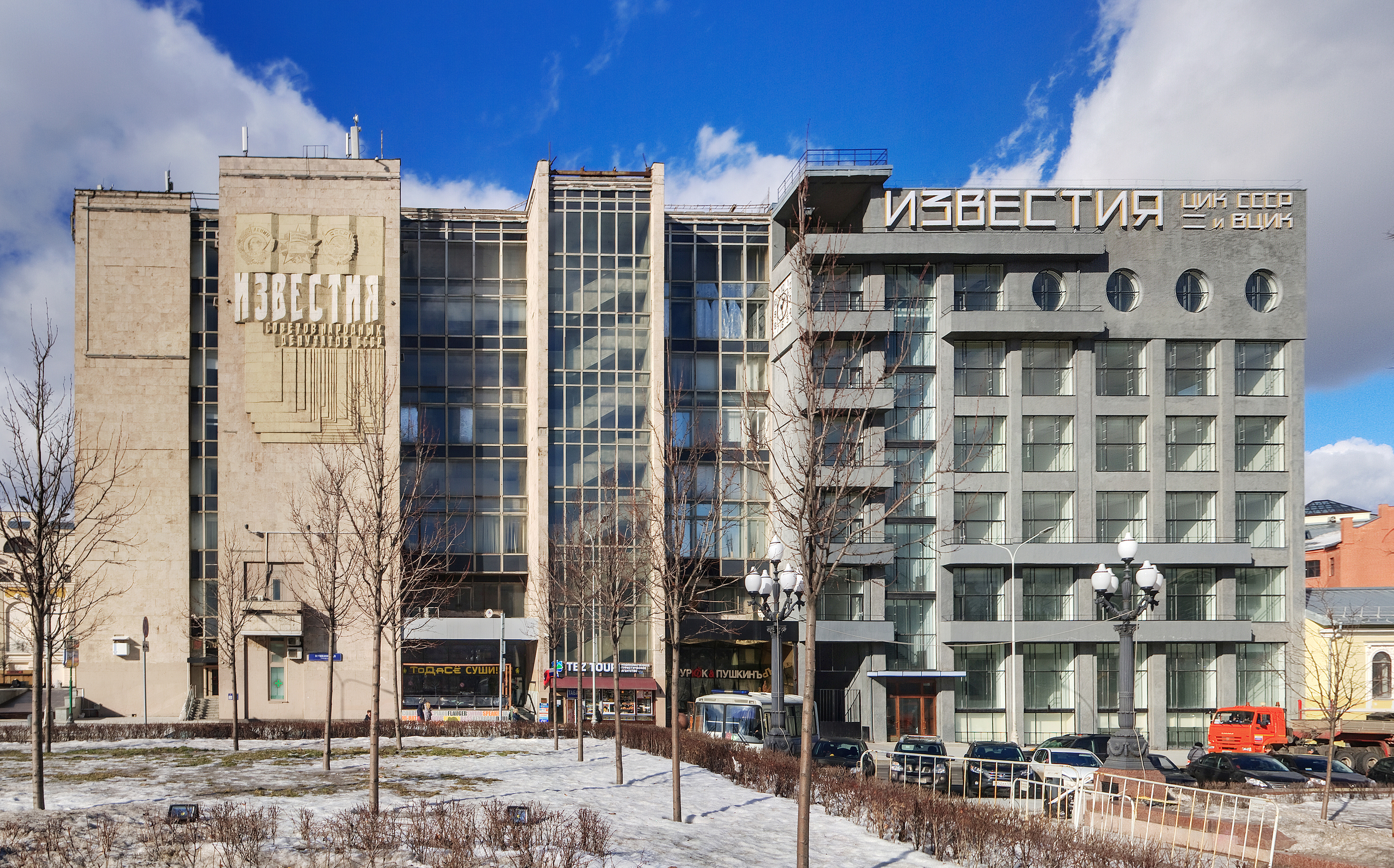
Izvestiia Newspaper Building in Moscow

Following the dissolution of the Soviet Union, Izvestia now describes itself as a "national newspaper" of Russia. The newspaper was owned by a vast holding company of Vladimir Potanin which had close ties with the government. A controlling stake in Izvestia was purchased by state-owned Gazprom on 3 June 2005, and included in the Gazprom Media holding. According to the allegations of the Committee to Protect Journalists, Raf Shakirov, editor-in-chief of Izvestia, was forced to resign because the government officials did not like the paper's coverage of the Beslan school hostage crisis. Other sources informed that Potanin had asked him to leave for fear the Kremlin would be riled by the explicit photographs of the massacre published by Izvestia. As of 2005, the circulation of Izvestia was 240,967. Its 2007 circulation certified by TNS Gallup Media was 371,000 copies. Until his death on 1 October 2008, the chief artist was Boris Yefimov, the centenarian illustrator who had worked as Joseph Stalin's political cartoonist.

In 2008, Gazprom Media sold Izvestia to National Media Group.

In May 2024, the European Union accused the newspaper of spreading propaganda and placed it on its sanctions list.

== See also ==
- Izvestia Moskovskogo Soveta Rabochikh Deputatov
- Mass media in Russia
- Pravda
