= The Execution (film) =

- Directed by: Lado Kvataniya
- Written by: Olga Gorodetskaya; Lado Kvataniya
- Produced by: Pavel Burya; Elizaveta Chalenko; Ilya Dzhincharadze
- Starring: Niko Tavadze; Yuliya Snigir; Viktoriya Tolstoganova; Daniil Spivakovsky; Evgeniy Tkachuk; Aglaya Tarasova
- Cinematography: Denis Firstov
- Edited by: Vladislav Yakunin
- Production company: Hype Film
- Distributed by: VLG.FILM
- Release dates: September 2021 (Fantastic Fest); April 21, 2022
- Running time: 137 min.
- Country: Russia
- Language: Russian

The Execution (Russian: Казнь, romanized: Kazn) is a 2021 Russian mystery thriller film directed by Lado Kvataniya. It premiered at the 2021 Fantastic Fest and theatrically released in Russia on April 21, 2022.

== Plot ==
The film tells about an investigator named Issa Davydov, who, 10 years after investigating a series of brutal murders, finds out that innocent people were punished.

== Cast ==
- Niko Tavadze as Issa Davydov (prototype Issa Kostoyev)
- Yuliya Snigir as Vera
- Viktoriya Tolstoganova as Nadezhda
- Daniil Spivakovsky as Miron
- Evgeniy Tkachuk as Ivan Sevastyanov
- Aglaya Tarasova as Kira
- Igor Savochkin as Artur Khomraev
- Valentin Smirnitsky as General

== Reception ==
The Execution has an approval rating of 92% on review aggregator website Rotten Tomatoes, based on 12 reviews, and an average rating of 7.4/10.
