= Alexandra Ursuliak =

Russian actress

- Александра Урсуляк
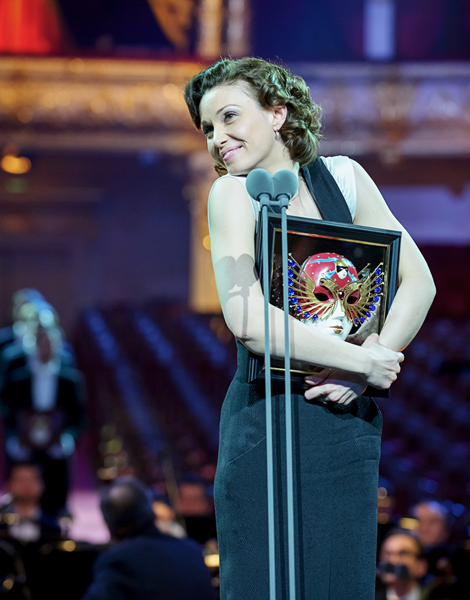
- Alexandra Ursulyak at the Golden Mask Award ceremony in 2014
- Born: Alexandra Sergeevna Ursuliak; 4 February 1983 (age 43); Moscow, RSFSR, USSR
- Education: Moscow Pushkin Drama Theatre
- Occupation: Actress
- Years active: 2003–present
- Children: 2

Alexandra Sergeevna Ursuliak (Russian: Алекса́ндра Серге́евна Урсуля́к; born February 4, 1983) is a Russian stage, television, and film actress.

== Early life and education ==
She was born in Moscow, Russian SFSR, in the family of director Sergei Ursuliak and actress Galina Nadirli.

In 2003 she graduated from the acting department of the Moscow Art Theater School (course leaders Dmitry Brusnikin and Roman Kozak).

She appeared in the fifth season of ice show contest Ice Age.

== Selected filmography ==
- Sherlock Holmes as Helen (2013)
- Leo and Tig as Tig (voice; since 2016)
- Ekaterina as Darya Nikolayevna Saltykova (2016)
- The Age of Pioneers as Svetlana Leonova (2017)
- Better than Us as Marina (2018)
- Jumpman as judge (2018)
- The Librarian as Shorokhova (2023)

== Awards ==
2014

- Golden Mask: Best Actress (Drama)

2022

- Golden Eagle Award: Best Actress on Television

2024

- Golden Eagle Award: Best Leading Actress
