= 7 Days, 7 Nights =

- Directed by: Hayk Kbeyan
- Written by: Narek Avagyan; Mikhail Aleksanyants; Ashot Abrahamyan
- Produced by: Gevond Andreasyan; Sarik Andreasyan; Georgy Shabanov; Tigran Hambardzmyan; Ilya Shuvalov; Hrayr Grigoryan; Artashes Andreasyan; Narek Stepanyan
- Starring: Sergey Marin; Zoya Berber; Egor Nikolayenko; Sofiya Petrova; Arman Navasardyan; Alina Barkalova; Yuliya Sharova; Armen Margaryan
- Cinematography: Artur Ustyan
- Edited by: Arsen Safaryan
- Music by: Vahe Grigoryan; Artashes Andreasyan
- Production companies: All Media Company; K.B.A.; PGG Films; START Studio
- Distributed by: National Media Group Film Distribution
- Release date: May 16, 2024 (Russia)
- Running time: 98 minutes
- Country: Russia
- Language: Russian
- Box office: ₽22 million

7 Days, 7 Nights (Russian: 7 дней, 7 ночей, romanized: 7 dney, 7 nochey, lit. '7 Days, 7 Nights') is a 2024 Russian family comedy film directed by Hayk Kbeyan. The Gureev family is facing divorce. But they get an unexpected chance to fix everything when, thanks to their daughter's efforts, they end up in sunny Armenia for 7 days and 7 nights. It stars Sergey Marin, Zoya Berber, Egor Nikolaenko and Sofya Petrova.

This film was theatrically released in Russia on May 16, 2024, by National Media Group Film Distribution.

== Plot ==
Photographer Sergey Gureev fulfills the request of his boss, Mikaela, with whom he's having an affair. He compromises his principles and photographs her sister's wedding. The gorgeous Mikaela clings to him, but he acts distantly toward her. Ultimately, she sends him on a business trip to Armenia. This job is supposed to make Sergey famous, but it's also his daughter Nastya's birthday.

Eight-year-old Nastya is walking home with her mother, Olga. The girl dreams of a dog, but her mother is against the idea. Olga texts Sergey and asks him to babysit the children that evening. The man fulfills his wife's request. He also gives his daughter his fee for the dog's wedding photo shoot and says he'll fly to Armenia for a week. The couple quarrel. It turns out that Sergey has cheated on Olya. His excuses, that it happened in a drunken stupor, fail to impress Olga, and she demands a divorce. Nastya overhears the argument.

Nastya tells her older brother, Anton, that her parents are getting divorced. The boy had already guessed. She was sure her parents could still find love, like in the fairy tale about the prince and princess her father told her. They just needed a little help.

Nastya and Anton turn to their Armenian neighbor, Uncle Vachik, for help. Through him, they buy a tour to sunny Armenia with the money their father left them. They eventually meet their father on the plane.

Upon arrival, Sergey doesn't want to leave his wife with Oganes, Vachik's twin brother, who has been asked to look after the Gureyev family during their vacation. So, he puts his work aside and goes with the family. On the way, it turns out that Oganes has invited a UNESCO commission to Armenia to register the ancient wedding ceremony, celebrated for seven days and seven nights, as an intangible cultural heritage. On his very first day, Oganes ran into trouble with his careless assistant, Garik, and he had to ask his guests to stop by to attend his business.

During his visit to the ceremony, Anton found himself in trouble. Oganes saved him from an enraged bull, but he himself was injured and hospitalized. For ethnographer Oganes, registering with UNESCO was his life's work, and he asked the Gureev family to handle the ceremony in his stead. Sergey initially wanted to refuse, but Olga and the children decided to help. Problems arose every day of the ceremony, and the registration process was constantly hanging in the balance. However, thanks to Sergey's resourcefulness, everything went smoothly.

On the final day, the actors playing the newlyweds and the priest were unable to participate in Oganes's project. Only a real wedding with a real priest could solve this problem. At the film's finale, thanks to the trials and adventures the Gureevs faced that week, Sergey managed to gain Olga's forgiveness, and the ceremony was completed.

== Cast ==
- Sergey Marin as Sergey Gureev, a photographer
- Zoya Berber as Olga Gureeva, a translator
- Egor Nikolaenko as Anton Gureev, Sergey and Olga's son
- Sofya Petrova as Nastya Gureeva, Sergey and Olga's daughter
- Arman Navasardyan as Vachik / Oganes
- Alina Barkalova as Mikaella, Sergey's boss and lover
- Yuliya Sharova as Lisbet
- Armen Margaryan as Garik
- Levon Harutyunyan as Kamo
- Aleksandr Berdnikov as Marcus

== Production ==
The film was produced by Gevond Andreasyan and Sarik Andreasyan's company K.B.A. (Russian: Кинокомпания братьев Андреасян, romanized: Kinokompaniya brat'yev Andreasyan, lit. 'Andreasyan Brothers Film Company').

=== Filming ===
Filming took place in Armenia in the second half of 2023 and concluded in October.
