= Murderous Fervour =

- Genre: Detective; Drama
- Based on: Real events
- Written by: Yuliya Shunto; Aleksey Sashin
- Directed by: David Tkebuchava
- Starring: Sergey Marin; Alexander Samoylenko; Sergey Chirkov; Zoya Berber
- Composer: Igor Babayev
- Country of origin: Russia
- Original language: Russian
- No. of seasons: 2
- No. of episodes: 20

Production
- Executive producers: Suzanna Muazen; Irina Bark
- Producers: Timur Weinstein; Vadim Ostrovsky; Anna Olshevskaya
- Cinematography: Oleg Topoev
- Production company: Amedia Production

Original release
- Network: NTV
- Release: 31 May 2021 – 10 October 2025

Murderous Fervour (Russian: Душегубы, romanized: Dusheguby, lit. 'Murderers') is a Russian detective drama television series directed by David Tkebuchava and produced by Amedia Production.

The series stars Sergey Marin, Alexander Samoylenko, Sergey Chirkov, and Zoya Berber. It is based on real events and depicts the investigation and capture of Soviet serial killer Gennady Mikhasevich, who murdered women in the Byelorussian SSR between 1971 and 1985.

The series premiered on NTV from 31 May to 4 June 2021 and received positive critical reception, particularly for its screenplay. A sequel series, Dusheguby 2 (also known as Dusheguby: 1989), premiered on 6 October 2025.

== Plot ==
=== Season 1 ===
The story is set in 1984. Senior investigator Leonid Ipatyev of the Prosecutor General's Office of the Byelorussian SSR is sent from Minsk to Vitebsk to assist in the investigation of a missing traffic police inspector. Instead, investigators discover the body of a young woman who had been raped and strangled.

Ipatyev uncovers that over the previous 14 years, 36 similar murders occurred in the Vitebsk region, all closed by the same investigator, Mikhail Shakhnovich. Challenging established practices, Ipatyev proposes the existence of a serial killer and pushes to reopen the cases. Despite resistance from corrupt officials, the true killer is identified, wrongful convictions are overturned, and those responsible for judicial misconduct are punished.

=== Season 2 ===
In 1984, Nikolai Samoylov murders a woman at a private party and escapes. Moscow investigator Maksim Kovalsky tracks him down and proves he is responsible for seven murders.

By 1989, Samoylov is held in a psychiatric hospital and examined at the Serbsky Institute in Moscow. During a transfer, he escapes, and a new murder occurs near Moscow. Ipatyev and Kovalsky must determine whether Samoylov has resumed killing or if a new murderer is at large.

== Cast ==
- Sergey Marin — Leonid Ipatyev
- Zoya Berber — Olga Aksyonova
- Alexander Samoylenko — Mikhail Shakhnovich
- Sergey Chirkov — Yuri Mandrik
- Sofya Sinitsyna — Asya Kruglova
- Yuri Tuzov — Prosecutor Krivitsky
- Vasily Mishchenko — Ales Vasilevich
- Yuri Nazarov — Ipatyev's father
- Tatyana Rasskazova — Antonina Pavlovna
- Vladislav Vetrov — Kirichenkov

== Production ==
The series was shot in Serpukhov.

== Release and reception ==
On 12 April 2021, NTV sold international broadcasting rights to the French distributor Ampersand Fiction.

The series was an audience success. Critics praised it as a classic Soviet-era retro detective drama, noting its restrained style and strong writing.
