= Ice 2 =

- Theatrical release poster
- Russian: Лёд 2
- Directed by: Zhora Kryzhovnikov
- Written by: Andrey Zolotarev
- Produced by: Mikhail Vrubel; Aleksandr Andryushchenko; Fyodor Bondarchuk; Anton Zlatopolsky (ru); Vyacheslav Murugov (ru)
- Starring: Aglaya Tarasova; Alexander Petrov; Mariya Aronova; Vitaliya Korniyenko; Nadezhda Mikhalkova; Yulia Khlynina; Sergey Lavygin
- Cinematography: Ivan Lebedev
- Edited by: Aleksandr Andryushchenko; Aleksandr Puzyryov; Egor Tarasenko
- Production companies: Columbia Pictures; Vodorod; Art Pictures Studio; National Media Group Studio; Cinema Foundation; STS; Russia-1
- Distributed by: Sony Pictures Releasing
- Release dates: February 14, 2020 (Russia and Other countries)
- Running time: 132 minutes
- Country: Russia
- Language: Russian
- Budget: $5.1 million (₽322.4 million)
- Box office: $20.4 million (₽1.4 billion)

Ice 2 (Russian: Лёд 2, romanized: Lyod 2) is a 2020 Russian musical romantic drama sports film directed by Zhora Kryzhovnikov. The film stars Aglaya Tarasova, Alexander Petrov and Mariya Aronova in the lead roles, joined by Nadezhda Mikhalkova and Yulia Khlynina.

Ice 2 was theatrically released in Russia on Valentine's Day, February 14, 2020.

The film is a sequel to the film Ice and, like its predecessor, became a blockbuster. It grossed 193.7 million rubles on opening day, making it the highest-grossing Russian film on opening day. In total, the film has grossed over 1.4 billion rubles.

In 2024, a sequel, Ice 3, was released, marking the completion of the trilogy.

== Plot ==
The film opens with Nadia Lapshina on her way to marry hockey player Sasha Gorin after a successful match. Time passes, and Nadia becomes pregnant; they are expecting a girl. Shortly after Sasha leaves for another game, Nadia goes into labor but tragically dies during childbirth due to complications. Sasha is left to raise their daughter, named after Nadia, but struggles to cope with his loss.

Eight years later, children's coach Irina Shatalina gains custody of Nadia through the courts, prohibiting Sasha from seeing her. In despair, Sasha's volatile nature complicates matters, and he nearly attempts to flee with his daughter. However, Shatalina's intervention and Sasha's decision to renounce his parental rights lead to a temporary loss of custody.

Eventually, Shatalina expresses remorse for her actions and they find Nadia together on the ice, leading to an emotional reunion. The film concludes with Nadia performing a routine on the ice, encouraged by her mother's spirit to succeed. In the final scene, Nadia, Sasha, Shatalina, and a social worker share a joyful moment on the hockey rink.

== Cast ==
- Aglaya Tarasova as Nadezhda 'Nadya' Lapshina
- Alexander Petrov as Alexander 'Sasha' Gorin
- Mariya Aronova as Irina Shatalina, figure skating coach
- Vitaliya Korniyenko as Nadezhda 'Nadya' Gorina, Nadya and Sasha's daughter
- Nadezhda Mikhalkova as Anna 'Anya', employee of the department of guardianship
- Yulia Khlynina as Margarita 'Rita', sports director of the hockey club Baykprommash
- Sergey Lavygin as Sergey Ivanovich, coach of the hockey team
- Pavel Ustinov as skate rental employee
- Sergey Kuznetsov as security guard

== Production ==
Zhora Kryzhovnikov will occupy the directorial chair of the film Ice 2 - the sequel to the 2018 sports movie. The script for the tape was again written by Andrey Zolotarev, who worked on the first film, wrote the script for the sequel.

=== Filming ===
Principal photography began on March 23, 2019, in Lake Baikal, the Republic of Buryatia, Irkutsk Oblast, continue in Moscow. The slogan of the film is Putter on Ice.

=== Music ===
The film contains several covers of famous Russian songs :

- Poplar Fuzz (Тополиный пух) - Ivanushki International.
- The Beautiful Afar (Прекрасное далёко) - theme song of the television miniseries Guest from the Future.
- Not Gonna Get Us (Нас не догонят) - t.A.T.u.
- Lake of Hope (Озеро надежды) - Alla Pugacheva.
- Spins (Кружит) - Monatik.
- Saṃsāra (Сансара) - Basta.

== Release ==
Ice 2 is scheduled for release in the Russian Federation on February 14, 2020, by Sony Pictures Productions and Releasing (SPPR). Premiered on March 6, 2020, in the United States and Canada.

== Reception ==
=== Box office ===
On the first day of rental, the film collected 189.348 million rubles. This is the most successful start of a domestic film at the box office. According to the results of the first weekend, Ice 2 grossed over 577.3 million rubles, and thus led the Russian hire. At the second weekend, the film again became the leader: as of February 24, 2020, the film collected more than 1 billion rubles, becoming the 14th Russian film to overcome this line of box office. As of March 12, 2020, the sequel has collected 1.511 billion rubles, thereby he managed to block the success of the first part.

=== Accolades ===
Date	Award	Category	Recipient(s) and nominee(s)	Result	Notes
2022	35th Golden Rooster Awards	Best Foreign Language Film	Ice 2	Nominated	
