= Aunt Martha (TV series) =

- Genre: Sitcom with elements of social drama
- Written by: Andrey Mukhortov; Dmitry Zverkov; Konstantin Mankovsky; Ilya Vlasyevsky
- Directed by: Evgeny Shelyakin; Vsevolod Brodsky; Andrey Silkin
- Starring: Vitaliya Korniyenko
- Composers: Artyom Fedotov; Denis Pekarev; Gleb Lubyansky; Nikita Savelyev; Arseniy Bobryshev; Karen Kazakov; Ruslan Abdulkerimov; Alexey Karpov; Dmitry Balakin; Valery Tsarkov
- Country of origin: Russia
- Original language: Russian
- No. of seasons: 2
- No. of episodes: 34

Production
- Producers: Anton Fedotov; Maxim Rybakov; Fyodor Bondarchuk; Dmitry Tabarchuk
- Running time: 24 minutes

Original release
- Network: STS
- Release: 3 October 2022 – 11 April 2024

Aunt Martha (Russian: Тётя Марта, romanized: Tyotya Marta) is a Russian TV series produced since 2022. Made by "Art Pictures Studio" film companies.

== Plot ==
A nine-year-old girl, Marta, lives in Moscow without parents, only with her grandfather. However, the grandfather has dementia. Therefore, he needs care. Martha hides her marital status from everyone in order not to get into an children's homes. She is forced to lead an adult life, because, besides school lessons, she has a lot of household chores. One day, a relative from Kazan, Marat, comes to her. He moves into the same apartment with her. However, his goal is not to take care of the girl. To pay off his debts, Marat decides to take over Martha's apartment.

Gradually, Marat gets warm feelings for Martha and abandons the idea of cheating on her apartment. Meanwhile, Martha is looking for her mother.

== Cast and characters ==
- Vitaliya Korniyenko as Marta Samsonova / Yulia Pavlova (twin sisters)
- Alexander Metyolkin as Marat Yenikeev (Martha's cousin, a distant relative of Vasily Samsonov)
- Yury Kuznetsov as Vasily Samsonov (Martha's grandfather, retired)
- Sergey Epishev as Ilya Aksenov (loser actor, Martha's neighbor)
- Kristina Asmus as Olga Viktorovna (Martha's teacher, Marat's lover)
- Aleksandr Yatsko as Viktor Sergeevich (Olga Viktorovna's father)
- Valeria Zoidova as Antonina Kalyasina (policewoman, Marat's lover)
- Alexander Golubkov as Dmitry (an acquaintance of Marat, was in prison)
- Ekaterina Kabak as Melanie (Martha's neighbor, Dmitry's lover)
- Zoya Berber as Vera Pavlova (Yulia Pavlova's guardian) — season 2
- Matvey Voronin as Danila Pavlov (son of Vera) — season 2

== Awards ==
- The "Most OK" Award (2022) — in the nomination "TV Series of the Year".
- In December 2022, at the Patriki Film Festival, the TV series won the prize as the main social film project of the year.
- TEFI-KIDS 2023 — in the nomination "The best TV series for children and family viewing".
- TEFI-KIDS 2023 — in the nomination "Director of a program/movie/series for children and family viewing" (received by Evgeny Shelyakin).
