= Yuri's Day (film) =

- Directed by: Kirill Serebrennikov
- Written by: Yuri Arabov
- Starring: Kseniya Rappoport
- Release date: 2008
- Running time: 135 minutes
- Country: Russia
- Language: Russian

Yuri's Day (Russian: Юрьев день, romanized: Yuriev den) is a 2008 Russian drama film directed by Kirill Serebrennikov. The film won the Grand Prix at the Warsaw International Film Festival.

== Plot ==
Before leaving for a permanent residence in Germany, famous opera singer Lyuba (Kseniya Rappoport) brings her son Andryusha (Roman Shmakov) to the Russian hinterland to say goodbye to her native home. For her these places represent beautiful romanticism of Russian poetry. The son goes to see an exposition of the local kremlin and disappears. Lyuba first looks for her son, and then remains in the town and waits for her son to return. Gradually she becomes a different person. Opera singer Lyubov loses her son, voice, destiny and transforms into a coarse cleaner Lucy. And in this new person additional qualities appear.

== Cast ==
- Kseniya Rappoport – Lyubov Pavlovna
- Evgenia Kuznetsova – Tatiana
- Sergey Sosnovsky – Sergeev
- Sergey Medvedev – Andrei-monk
- Igor Khripunov – Andrei-"Petty"
- Vladislav Abashin – manager
- Juris Lauciņš – prisoner
- Ulyana Lukina – young
- Olga Onischenko – lame woman
- Natalia Batrak – saleswoman
- Roman Shmakov – Andrei Dmitrievich Vasilyev, son of Lyubov Pavlovna
- Dmitry Podnozov – policeman
- Ekaterina Durova – nurse of Dunya
- Valery Petrov – chief doctor of the hospital

== Awards ==
- Grand Prix – Warsaw International Film Festival
- FICC/IFFS Prize; Special Mention, Oecumenical Jury; First Prize, Youth Jury – Locarno Festival
- Golden Eagle Awards – Best Actress (Kseniya Rappoport)
- Kinotavr – Best Actress (Kseniya Rappoport)
- Russian Guild of Film Critics Awards – Best Actress (Kseniya Rappoport)
