= Deadly Illusions (2020 film) =

- Directed by: Oleg Asadulin
- Written by: Mikhail Zubko; Sergey Chetverukhin
- Produced by: Georgy Malkov; Safronov Brothers
- Starring: Andrey Burkovsky; Pavel Chinaryov; Danila Yakushev; Aglaya Tarasova; Semyon Treskunov; Sergey Safronov; Aleksei Kravchenko; Marina Petrenko
- Cinematography: Yuri Kokoshkin
- Edited by: Rodion Nikolaychuk
- Music by: Yevgeni Rudin
- Production companies: MEGOGO Studios; M-Production
- Distributed by: MEGOGO
- Release date: November 19, 2020
- Running time: 108 min.
- Country: Russia
- Language: Russian

Deadly Illusions (Russian: Смертельные иллюзии, romanized: Smertelniye illyuzii) is a 2020 Russian thriller film directed by Oleg Asadulin. It was theatrically released in Russia on November 19, 2020.

== Plot ==
The film tells about the famous illusionists, the Romanov brothers, who decide to prepare a grandiose show and end their joint performances. But at the beginning of this show, something went wrong.

== Cast ==
- Andrey Burkovsky as Denis Romanov
- Pavel Chinaryov as Ilya Romanov
- Danila Yakushev as Viktor Romanov
- Aglaya Tarasova as Katya
- Semyon Treskunov as Egor
- Sergey Safronov as Konstantin
- Aleksei Kravchenko as show director
- Marina Petrenko as Irina
- Aleksandr Galibin as Pyotr Istomin
