= Air (2023 Russian film) =

- Directed by: Aleksei German Jr.
- Written by: Aleksei German Jr.; Elena Kiseleva
- Produced by: Artem Vasiliev (ru); Konstantin Ernst; Sergey Titinkov (ru); Fedor Sherbakov; Nataliya Klibanova; Yevgeny Ulyushkin
- Starring: Anastasia Talyzina; Aglaya Tarasova; Kristina Lapshina (ru); Sergey Bezrukov; Elena Lyadova; Oleg Grinchenko; Anton Shagin; Kristina Isaykina-Berger
- Cinematography: Natalya Makarova; Yuliya Galochkina; Konstantin Postnikov
- Edited by: Mukharam Kabulova
- Music by: Andrei Surotdinov
- Production companies: AMedia; Channel One; MetraFilms; SAGa; Kinoprime Foundation; Cinema Fund
- Distributed by: National Media Group Film Distribution
- Release dates: October 26, 2023 (TIFF); January 18, 2024 (Russia)
- Running time: 151 minutes
- Country: Russia
- Language: Russian
- Budget: ₽783 million
- Box office: ₽502 million; $5.4 million

Air (Russian: Воздух) is a 2023 Russian historical war drama film written and directed by Aleksei German Jr. about female pilots at the front during the Great Patriotic War, starring Anastasia Talyzina, Aglaya Tarasova and Kristina Lapshina.

Air premiered on October 26, 2023, at the 36th Tokyo International Film Festival. The film was theatrically released in Russia on January 18, 2024, by National Media Group Film Distribution.

== Plot ==
The film is set during the Second World War in the spring of 1942, amidst fierce battles on the Leningrad Front, where significant human and technical resources are dedicated to holding back the advance of German troops. Female volunteers are recruited into a mixed aviation regiment to fly military aircraft, facing skepticism from the predominantly male staff, who treat them with distrust.

Zhenya is a talented pilot whose only dream is to master flight and defeat enemies. She feels more confident in the sky than on the ground, struggling to build relationships due to her past experiences with loss. Despite her young age, she tries to avoid emotional connections, but her dedication to flying makes her the top pilot in the regiment, surpassing even seasoned commanders. As the other female pilots improve their skills, Zhenya remains emotionally distant. However, the increasing deaths of her colleagues begin to take a toll on her, forcing her to confront her fears and the realities of war.

== Cast ==
- Anastasia Talyzina as Evgenia 'Zhenya' Belova
- Aglaya Tarasova as Ekaterina 'Katya'
- Kristina Lapshina as Maria 'Masha'
- Sergey Bezrukov as Alexey Astafiev
- Elena Lyadova as Rita
- Oleg Grinchenko as Captain Bondar
- Anton Shagin as Volodya
- Kristina Isaykina-Berger as Marina Yatsenko

=== Other cast ===
- Igor Mityushkin as Pavel 'Pashechka', mechanic
- Igor Korovin as Stepanov, technician
- Anna Isaeva as Sveta, a nurse
- Mariya Melnikova as a nurse
- Vladimir Tyaptushkin as Timofey
- Andrey Kondratyev as Konyakhin
- Mariya Gerasimenko as Anya Savelyeva
- Darya Shevelko as Shevelko, a female technician
- Alyona Mityushkina as Mityushkina, a female technician
- Marusya Furina as Medvedeva, a female technician
- Polina Dudkina as Frolova, a female pilot
- Polina Krasavina as Chumakova, a female pilot
- Anna Musina as Novotortseva, a female pilot
- Philip Dyachkov as Kirill, pilot
- Ivan Ryabenko as a pilot
- Mikhail Samarin as a pilot
- Pyotr Logachev as a pilot
- Marina Mustetsova as a partisan

== Production ==
Work on the film began in 2018. The budget amounted to 450 million rubles, the project received support from the Russian Ministry of Culture and the Cinema Foundation.

=== Filming ===
Principal photography began in 2018 and took place in Saint Petersburg, Leningrad, Pskov and Astrakhan regions. However, the work was fraught with difficulties. At first, the group could not wait for snow on the Gulf of Finland, and in April 2020, filming was completely stopped due to the pandemic. In the fall of 2021, the second stage of the filming process began, which was completed in 2022.

During this time, material was filmed for all scenes of air battles.

=== Post-production ===
Together with XOVP - eXtraOrdinary Virtual Production, LED panel screens with a total area of 800m2 were built, gimbles for full-size aircraft models were used, the Unreal Engine, which came from the game world, In-Camera VFX technology, which made it possible to synchronously integrate graphics right on the set. 12 Yak-1B model aircraft were built, and wartime field airfields were recreated.

== Release ==
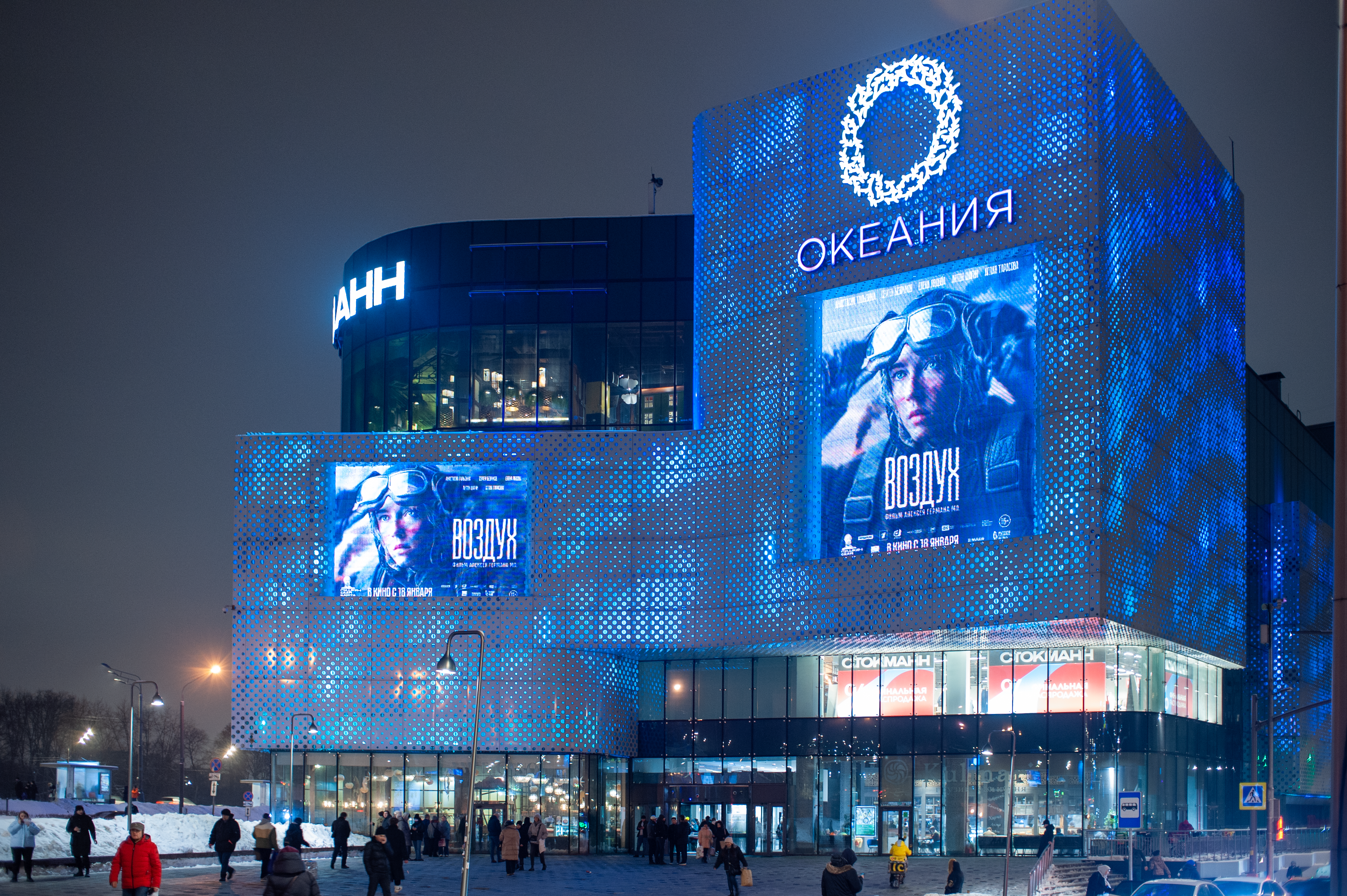
Shopping and entertainment center "Oceania" in Moscow.

=== Marketing ===
The film's worldwide release took place at the Tokyo International Film Festival in October 2023. Then the director, production designer and several actresses went to Japan, including the performers of the leading roles Talyzina, Tarasova and Lyadova. It was released theatrically in the Russian Federation on January 18, 2024.
