= Viktoriya Tolstoganova =

Russian film and theater actress (born 1972)

- Виктория Толстоганова
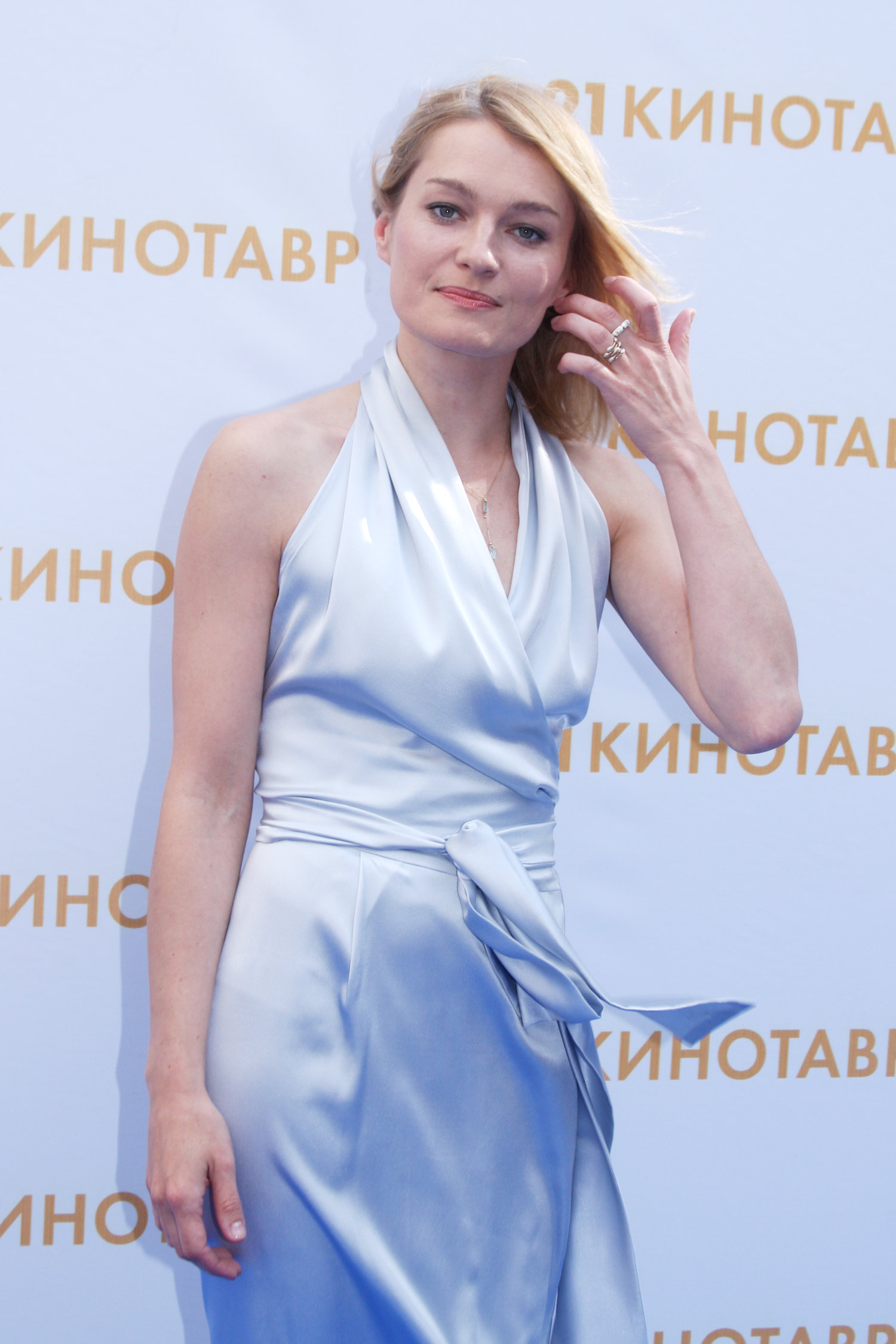
- At the opening of the 21st film festival "Kinotavr" in 2010.
- Born: Viktoriya Viktorovna Tolstoganova; 24 March 1972 (age 54); Moscow, RSFSR, USSR
- Education: Russian Institute of Theatre Arts
- Occupation: Actress
- Years active: 1997–present
- Spouse(s): Andrei Kuzichev (m. 1996–2011) Alexey Agranovich (m. 2011–present)
- Awards: Golden Eagle Award

Viktoriya Viktorovna Tolstoganova (Russian: Викто́рия Ви́кторовна Толстога́нова; born 24 March 1972) is a Russian film and theater actress.

== Biography ==
Viktoriya Tolstoganova was born in Moscow, Russian SFSR, Soviet Union. Born on March 24, 1972, in Moscow in the family of an engineer and an English teacher. She has three younger sisters. After graduating high school, she tried to enter theater university. In 1992, Victoria passed the selection at both Gerasimov Institute of Cinematography (VGIK) and Russian Institute of Theatre Arts (GITIS). Her choice fell on Russian Institute of Theatre Arts (GITIS), where she studied traditional school of Russian psychological theatre for Professor Joseph Heifits. While still a student, she was invited to the troupe of the Moscow Art Theatre, where she served until the mid-2000s.

Tolstoganova graduated from GITIS in 1997 and made her film debut playing a major role in the short feature film “Day Duty” directed by Roman Khrushchev.

== Career ==
In 2003 she played the role of Marina in The Magnetic Storms. In 2004 she was selected to help chose the recipients of Russia's Triumph Prize winners. In 2005 she was a member of the jury at the 27th Moscow International Film Festival. In 2007 she played a prostitute in the film May. In 2010 she starred in the Klim Shipenko directed Who am I? playing a provincial journalist.

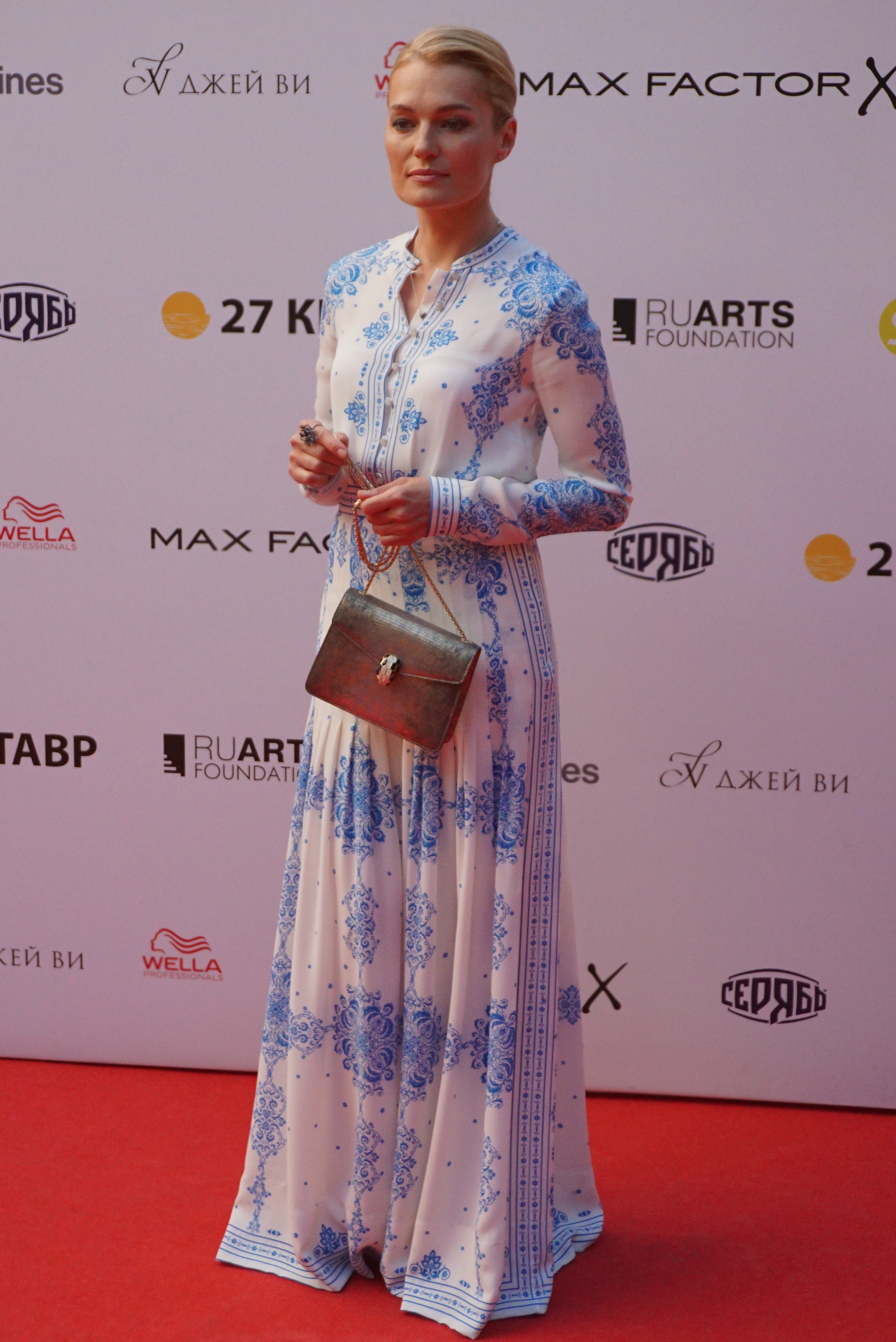
Viktoriya Tolstoganova at the Kinotavr film festival in Sochi, 2016.

== Personal life ==
In August 1996, Tolstoganova married actor Andrei Kuzichev. They have two children: daughter Varvara and son Fedor. The couple divorced in 2010 (according to other sources in 2011). On 17 May 2011 the actress gave birth to a son, Ivan. The boy’s father is theater director Alexey Agranovich.

== Selected filmography ==
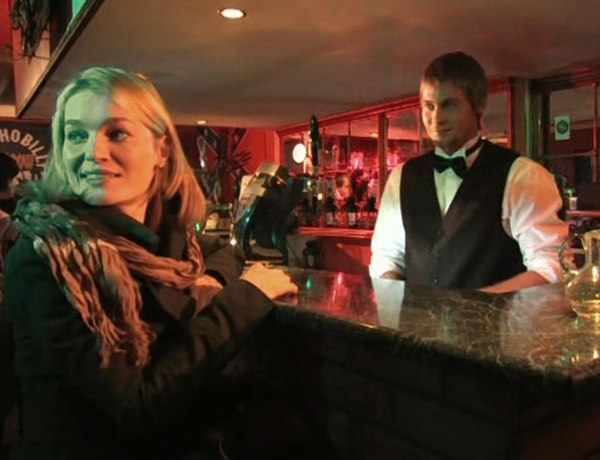
TV series "The Capital of Sin" 2010, Viktoriya Tolstoganova and Andrey Batt.

=== Film ===
Year	Title	Role	Notes
1997	My First Teacher, or The Russian Stag-Party		episode
2002	The Moon Glades		
2002	Shoemaker	Alisa	
2002	Antikiller	Tamara	
2002	The Kamikaze Diary	Larisa	
2003	The Ice-Crusted Ground	Ona	
2003	The Magnetic Storms	Marina	
2005	Escape	Irina	
2005	The Man's Season: The Velvet Revolution	wife Vershinina	
2007	May	Viktoriya	
2007	The branch of lilac	Natalya Satina	
2007	Naturщica	Dagni Yull	
2007	Korolev	Kseniya Vincentini wife Korolev	
2010	Burnt by the Sun 2: Exodus	Marusia Kotova	
2011	Burnt by the Sun 2: Citadel	Marusia Kotova	
2011	Find me	Natasha Kuzovlёva	
2012	The Spy	Iraida Petrakovich	
2015	Diamond cross	Anna Lanskaya	
2016	Champions: Faster. Above. Stronger	Svetlana Khorkina's mother	
2017	Going Vertical	Ksenia Garanzhina	
2018	Above The Sky	Mother	
2019	Thunderstorm	Kabanikha	
2020	Far Frontiers	Maria Leskova	
2021	Captain Volkonogov Escaped	Steiner widow	
2021	The Execution	Nadezhda	
2022	Sasha	Elena	

=== Television ===
Year	Title	Role	Notes
2002	Request stop	Lusya	Mini-series
2003	Give Me a Life	fashion model Rita	TV series
2003	The Angel on Roads	Sveta	TV series
2004	On The Nameless Height	Olga, a sniper	Television film
2004	Moscow Saga	Tasya Pyzhikova	TV series
2006	Storm Gate	Valya	Mini-series
2008	Revenge	Nina	TV
2008	Invasion	Natalia Nowickaya	TV
2009	Prodigal children	Lidiya Morozova	TV series
2009	Maternal instinct	Mariya Boikova	TV
2010	Family house	Evgeniya Alexeyevna Sokolova	TV series
2010	The Capital of Sin	Olga	TV series
2011	The Ballad of the bomber	Elizaveta	TV series
2011	Forest Lake	Tonya Stolyarov	TV
2013	Department	Lidiya	TV series
2014	Widow	Polina	TV series
2014	Embracing sky	Marina Lugovaya	TV series
2014	The Executioner	Raisa	TV series
2015	Investigator Tikhonov	Anastasia	TV series
2017	A Policeman's Wife	Lera Valetskaya	TV series
2019	Gold Diggers	Emma	TV series
2021	Mediator	Anna Larina	TV series
2020	Call-center	Gloria Polyanskaya	TV series
2022	The Telki	Zhenya	TV series
2024	Crime and Punishment	Katerina Ivanovna	TV series

== Awards and nominations ==
- 2003: Golden Eagle Award - Best Supporting Actress (Antikiller) – Nominee
- 2003: Golden Aries Award - Best Actress (Magnitnye buri) – Nominee
- 2004: Golden Eagle Award - Best Actress (Magnitnye buri) – Nominee
- 2004: Nika Award - Best Actress (Magnitnye buri) – Nominee
- 2013: Golden Eagle Award - Best Supporting Actress (Shpion) - Winner
- 2016: Golden Eagle Award - Best Television Actress (Palach) - Winner
- 2019: The Golden Unicorn Awards - Best Actress (Vyshe neba) – Nominee
