= Mariya Aronova =

Russian actress

- Мария Аронова
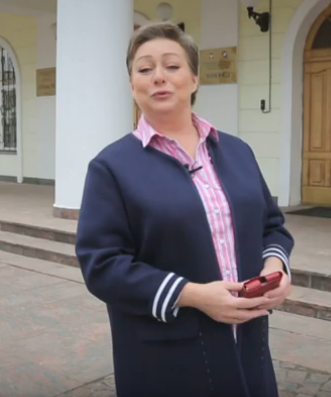
- Aronova at the House of Culture "Forward" in Dolgoprudny (2019)
- Born: Mariya Valeryevna Aronova; Dolgoprudny, Moscow Oblast, RSFSR, USSR
- Citizenship: Soviet Union (until 1991); Russia
- Occupations: Actress, television presenter
- Years active: 1995–present
- Spouse: Yevgeny Fomin
- Children: 2
- Awards: Honored Artist of the Russian Federation (2004); People's Artist of Russia (2012)

Mariya Valeryevna Aronova (Russian: Мари́я Вале́рьевна Аро́нова) is a Russian stage actress and a popular TV show host. She has appeared in more than 80 films.

== Early life ==
Aronova was born in Dolgoprudny, Moscow Oblast, Russian Soviet Federative Socialist Republic (later the Russian Federation), Soviet Union.

== Career ==
Since 1994 Aronova has been a member of the troupe at the Vakhtangov State Academic Theatre in Moscow.

== Awards and honours ==
- People's Artist of Russia (2012)
- People's Artist of the Republic of North Ossetia–Alania (2015)
- Laureate of the State Prize of the Russian Federation, named after Konstantin Sergeyevich Stanislavski (1994)
- Nika Award (2007)
- Golden Eagle Award (2007, 2022)
- Crystal Turandot Award (1998)

== Selected filmography ==
=== Film ===
Year	Title	Role	Notes
2007	Actress	Musya	
2015	Battalion	Maria Bochkareva	
2018	Ice	Irina Sergeyevna Shatalina	
2020	Ice 2	Irina Sergeyevna Shatalina	
2021	Couple from the Future	Sasha in 2040	
2024	The Bremen Town Musicians	the Atamansha	
2024	Ice 3	Irina Sergeyevna Shatalina	

== Dubbing roles ==
- The Nutcracker and the Mouseking (2004 animated feature films) — Mouseilda, her shadow and the Prince's nanny (ru)
- Zootopia (2016 animated feature films) — Bellwether
- ChalkZone— Milerd Tabootie
