= Uralochka (disambiguation) =

Uralochka literally means "woman from Ural" in Russian. It may refer to:

- VC Uralochka-NTMK, Russian professional women's volleyball club from Yekaterinburg
- Uralochka Sverdlovsk, a previous name of Uralochka-NTMK
- Uralochka Zlatoust, Russian professional women's water polo club from Zlatoust
- Palace of Sporting Games "Uralochka", Yekaterinburg
