= Zoya Berber =

Russian actress

- Зоя Бербер
- Born: Zoya Rudolfovna Berber; September 1, 1987 (age 38); Perm, RSFSR, USSR
- Citizenship: Russian
- Occupations: Actress; television presenter
- Years active: 2009–present

Zoya Rudolfovna Berber (Russian: Зо́я Рудо́льфовна Бе́рбер; born September 1, 1987) is a Russian stage, film, television, and voice actress, as well as a television presenter. She rose to prominence for her role as Lera Oborina in the Russian comedy television series Realnye patsany.

== Biography ==
Berber was born on September 1, 1987, in Perm, Russia. She studied at Perm School No. 91 in a theatre-focused class. She also studied music and completed five years of piano training at a music school. After finishing school, she enrolled in a choreography college and later studied fashion design.

She was admitted to the Perm State Institute of Culture (course of Boris Milgram), but was forced to take academic leave due to her work on the television series Realnye patsany.

== Career ==
Since 2009, Berber has performed in the play The Bullet Collector at the Perm theatre Scena-Molot, playing the role of Vika (directed by Ruslan Malikov).

In October 2009, she participated in the international festival Space of Directing as part of the official Russia–France program.

From 2010 to 2023, she played Lera in the comedy television series Realnye patsany on TNT. In 2015, she was nominated for the TEFI Award in the category “Best Actress in a Television Film/Series” for this role.

In 2011, she ranked 5th in the list of “100 Sexiest Women in the Country” according to the Russian edition of Maxim.

Since 2011, she has performed in the play Woe from Wit at the Perm Theatre-Theatre, playing Sofya Pavlovna (directed by Eduard Boyakov and Philipp Grigoryan).

On 28 September 2016, the music video for rapper Nigativ’s song Weightlessness was released, featuring Berber in the lead role. On 12 October 2016, the group 25/17 released the music video New Virus featuring Berber.

Since 2016, she has appeared in the play Caligula at the Moscow Provincial Theatre (directed by Sergey Zemlyansky).

In 2017, she worked as a host on the program Sports Moment on the Moscow 24 TV channel. Since 2018, she has hosted the program One Day in the City on the My Planet TV channel. She also stars as police android Anna Korolkevich in the television series Project Anna Nikolaevna.

== Personal life ==
On 29 June 2015, Berber gave birth to a daughter named Nadezhda. The child’s father is screenwriter Alexander Sineguzov, whom Berber met in 2010 on the set of Realnye patsany.

In autumn 2020, it became known that Berber and Sineguzov had separated.

In November 2023, Berber announced her engagement to actor Maksim Belborodov. They married on 7 February 2024. On 16 June 2024, the couple welcomed a son named Maksim.

== Theatre roles ==
Years	Production	Role	Theatre	Director
2009–present	The Bullet Collector	Vika	Scena-Molot	Ruslan Malikov
2011–present	Woe from Wit	Sofya Pavlovna	Theatre-Theatre	Eduard Boyakov, Philipp Grigoryan
2013	Riverside Drive	Barbara	Scena-Molot	Alexander Sozonov
2014	The Demon	Tamara	Yermolova Theatre	Sergey Zemlyansky
2016	Caligula	Mucius’ wife / ballet participant	Moscow Provincial Theatre	Sergey Zemlyansky
2017	The Adventures of Fandorin	Renata Kleber	Moscow Provincial Theatre	Tatyana Vdovichenko
2022–present	Arbenin. Masquerade Without Words	Baroness Strahl	Satire Theatre	Sergey Zemlyansky

== Filmography ==
- Fartsa (2015)
- Trigger (2020-present)
- Murderous Fervour (2021–2025)
- Aunt Martha (2022–2024)
- 7 Days, 7 Nights (2024)
- The Crazy Empress (2025)

=== Voice acting ===
- Attack the Block (2011) – Sam (voice of Jodie Whittaker)
