= Izvestia Moskovskogo Soveta Rabochikh Deputatov =

Izvestia Moskovskogo Soveta Rabochikh Deputatov was a Russian daily newspaper first issued by the Moscow Soviet during the 1905 Revolution. The title was revived when the Biulleten' Soveta rabochikh deputatov was renamed from March 15 (28) 1917, following the February Revolution.

== 1905 editions ==
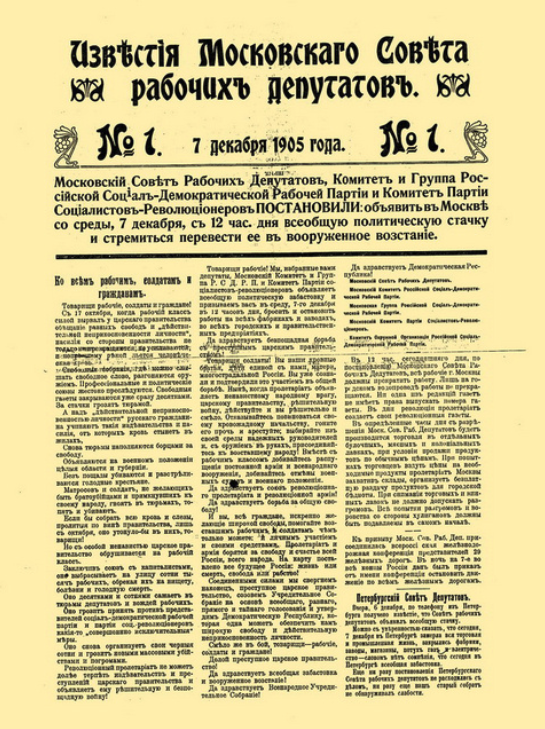
First issue, 7 December 1905

Memorial plaque "the first issue of Izvestia Moskovskogo Soveta was printed here"

From 7 (20) until 12 (25) December 1905, six issues were published, with 5,000–10,000 copies of each. It contained resolutions of the Moscow soviet of workers' deputies and of trade unions as well as articles materials concerning the uprisings both in Moscow and across the Russian Empire. Many of the short articles, notices, and appeals were written by workers. On 7 December, a general strike shut down all the other newspapers published in Moscow.

== 1917 editions ==
On 5th March 1917 an account was published of the meeting of the Moscow Council of Workers' Deputies.
