= Ice (2018 film) =

- Theatrical release poster
- Russian: Лёд
- Directed by: Oleg Trofim
- Screenplay by: Andrey Zolotarev; Oleg Malovichko
- Produced by: Fyodor Bondarchuk; Dmitriy Rudovskiy; Alexander Andryuschenko; Mikhail Vrubel; Vyacheslav Murugov (ru)
- Starring: Aglaya Tarasova; Alexander Petrov; Miloš Biković; Mariya Aronova; Yan Tsapnik; Kseniya Rappoport; Kseniya Lavrova-Glinka; Pavel Maykov
- Cinematography: Mikhail Milashin
- Music by: Anton Belyaev
- Production companies: Columbia Pictures; Art Pictures Studio; Vodorod; Russia-1; National Media Group Studio; Cinema Foundation; STS (TV channel)
- Distributed by: Walt Disney Studios Sony Pictures Releasing CIS
- Release date: February 14, 2018 (Russia)
- Running time: 113 minutes (Russia); 90 minutes (China, South Korea)
- Country: Russia
- Language: Russian
- Budget: $2 million (₽150 million)
- Box office: $26.4 million (₽1.5 billion)

Ice (Russian: Лёд, romanized: Lyod) is a 2018 Russian musical romantic drama sports film directed by Oleg Trofim, tells about a capable skater who received serious injury due to a partner's mistake, and her relationship with a hockey player, whose love will help her overcome herself. The film stars Aglaya Tarasova, Alexander Petrov and Miloš Biković.

Ice was theatrically released in Russia took place on February 14, 2018, and the Olympic Committee.

A sequel, titled Ice 2, was released in February 2020.

== Plot ==
The life of Nadya Lapshina (Aglaya Tarasova), a humble girl from the city of Irkutsk, Nadya Lapshina always dreamed of being a figure skater, but had problems with coordination and balance, which is why the famous children's coach Irina Sergeyevna Shatalina (Mariya Aronova) refused to take her as a student, contrary to the faith and persuasion of Nadya's mother. Nadya begins to live with her aunt Margosha, who sells bananas. Margosha treats her niece well and takes care of her as she can, but does not share the late sister's opinion about Nadya's potential. However, the girl does not give up and in the end shows such perseverance that Irina Shatalina decides to take her.

Nadya Lapshina begins to live in a boarding school at the local sports palace and learn the basics and subtleties of figure skating. At first, nothing comes out of her, but determination and good learning take their toll and Nadya becomes the best student of the boarding school. As a result, Irina Shatalina nominates her as a candidate for children's figure competitions held throughout the country. Another girl, who was the best before Nadya, tries to sabotage her performance by blunting her skates, but Nadya carries out the impossible and even performs dull-class dance on blunt blades.

Years pass. Nadya Lapshina has matured and became one of the most famous figure skaters in the country. She is invited to go to the big leagues, having tried on the role of a partner of the famous skater Vladimir Borisovich 'Vova' Leonov (Miloš Biković). At first, Nadya refuses, not wanting to leave her beloved coach, but Irina Shatalina, having fallen in love with Nadya as a daughter and wishing her advancement, tells her that her mother deceived her, saying that Irina discerned talent in her as a child. Nadya is upset, but decides to take a chance and eventually gets a place. Soon, he and Vova Leonov begin to live together and he even thinks of proposing to her. However, during the next performance, a catastrophe occurs: Vova accidentally drops Nadya and she hits so hard when she falls that she breaks the spine and becomes disabled. She closes herself from depression and stops communicating with everyone.

In the capital, she fails to recover, and she returns to her aunt and uncle, who uses a wheelchair. Irina Shatalina, learning about the troubles of her former student, decides to help her. Meanwhile, in the local hockey team, striker Alexander Arkadyevich 'Sasha' Gorin (Alexander Petrov) has a conflict with a friend, because of which he is suspended from the game. Irina offers him a deal: he will help Nadya restore spirit, and Irina will help him return to the team. Sasha Gorin pretends to agree, but at first he tries to cheat, seeing that Nadya is completely crushed and does not see a chance to recover. However, Irina quickly exposes him, and he begins to act for real.

At first, Sasha and Nadya cannot stand each other, but Sasha Gorin turns out to be a good psychologist and begins to restore Nadya's spirit by physically mocking her and then finding a common language. Soon this is bearing fruit: the sensitivity of the legs and the ability to move their fingers begin to return to Nadya. After that, they switch to physiotherapy exercises: Sasha starts taking Nadya to the local gym, where she learns to walk again and restores her atrophied leg muscles. As a result, she again gets to her feet, and then returns to the ice. At this point, their relationship with Sasha reached an almost romantic level. As a result, Nadya even persuades him to act as her partner on the return number, speaking in her previous role as a hockey player. The resulting unusual number is received warmly. Later, Sasha also admits to Nadya that in his childhood he also went in for figure skating for some time, to which his grandmother drove him, but his father considered him a purely female sport and persuaded his son to switch to hockey.

After their joint performance, Sasha Gorin unexpectedly meets Vova Leonov in the locker room, who is trying to convince him to leave Nadya, claiming that only he, Vova, can lead her to the Olympic medal. The whole day Sasha spends sad thoughts: he realizes that he has fallen in love with Nadya and wants to be with her, but Vova's words touched him too deeply. As a result, he gets drunk, comes to Nadya and lies to her that all this time he helped her only out of pity, leaving a big teddy bear won in the shooting gallery.

Nadya Lapshina again unites with Vova Leonova and begins performing in a big competition, but he drops her almost immediately. The doctor establishes that Nadya no longer has any problems with her back: the point is pure psychosomatics. Vova explodes and expresses that in fact he always considered Nadya an insignificant figure skater and spoke with her only because of her popularity among the people. Nadya does not stand it and returns to speak alone, although this is against the rules. Sasha, who watched the contest on television, does not dare to stay away and urgently gets to Moscow. Having entered the stadium with the support of Irina Shatalina, he takes his suit from a dejected Vova and goes out to the ice to Nadya. She in tears asks him why he came, and he confesses to her his feelings. The judges refuse to start playing music for them again, sitting among the audience, begins to sing themselves, and then the whole room picks up the song, and Nadya and Sasha perform a duet number for it.

Despite the fact that they remained disqualified, Nadya Lapshina and Sasha Gorin are happy, because now they can be together on the ice and outside it.

== Cast ==
- Aglaya Tarasova as Nadezhda Alexandrovna 'Nadya' Lapshina, a figure skater
  - Diana Enakaeva as Nadya Lapshina, as a child
- Alexander Petrov as Alexander Arkadyevich 'Sasha' Gorin, a hockey player
- Miloš Biković as Vladimir Borisovich 'Vova' Leonov, a pair skater
- Mariya Aronova as Irina Sergeyevna Shatalina, children's coach
- Yan Tsapnik as Vsevolod Igorevich 'Seva' Shulzhenko, coach Vova Leonov
- Kseniya Rappoport as Nadya Lapshina's mother
- Kseniya Lavrova-Glinka as Margosha, Nadya Lapshina's aunt
- Pavel Maykov as Gena, Margosha's lover
- Irina Starshenbaum as Zhzhyonova, a competitor
- Fyodor Bondarchuk as a tramp
- Andrey Zolotarev as reporter
- Maksim Belborodov as Mitya, a pair skater
- Andrey Balyakin as Andrey Burov, hockey coach
- Vilen Babichev as security at the Olympics in Sochi

== Production ==
The film was the feature-length debut of director Oleg Trofim. Aglaya Tarasova said that her figure skating coach on the set of the film was Katarina Gerbold, who was also her backup. In parallel with training on skates, Aglaya Tarasova spent about three months practicing vocals with the teacher Masha Katz.

=== Filming ===
Initially, the scenario did not specify that the events occur exactly in Irkutsk and Lake Baikal. It was noted only that a place of action is a certain provincial city. However, winter photographs of Lake Baikal impressed the director Oleg Trofim and he decided to shoot there. In total, the film crew spent about a week in Irkutsk, it was in the middle of March 2016.

During the preparation for the shooting, the main performers, who before that practically did not stand on skates, have received an intensive two-month training. The most difficult was the preparation of Aglaya Tarasova: Girl in parallel involved in dancing, figure skating, singing and even diving. By the way during the filming of the scene under water in the pool she spent nearly 12 hours.

The last shooting day was held in Moscow in the park Exhibition of Achievements of National Economy, where, according to the script, a romantic date of the main characters should take place. A number of scenes were filmed at the Olympic venues in the city of Sochi.

=== Music ===
The film contains several covers of famous Russian songs :

- Soldier (Солдат) - 5'nizza.
- Infinite (Бесконечность) - Zemfira.
- Do like me (Делай как я) - Bogdan Titomir.
- Pack of Cigarettes (Пачка Сигарет) - Kino.
- Fly (лететь) - Амега, cover by Anton Belyaev.

== Release ==
Ice is scheduled for release in the Russian Federation on February 14, 2018, by Walt Disney Studios Sony Pictures Releasing (WDSSPR).

== Sequel ==
On March 12, 2019, filming began for the continuation of the film, which will take place on Lake Baikal. As a director, Zhora Kryzhovnikov was invited.

Fyodor Bondarchuk said that the continuation of Ice 2 (2020 film) will be shot by another director, Zhora Kryzhovnikov, and the film will be released on February 14, 2020.
