= Aglaya Tarasova =

Russian actress

- Аглая Тарасова
- Born: Darya Viktorovna Tarasova; April 18, 1994 (age 32); Saint-Petersburg, Russia
- Citizenship: Russia and Israel
- Occupation: Actress
- Years active: 2010–present
- Partner(s): Miloš Biković (2017–2018); Darren Aronofsky (2018–2020)
- Mother: Kseniya Rappoport
- Awards: Golden Eagle Award (2019)

Aglaya Viktorovna Tarasova (Russian: Аглая Викторовна Тарасова; born April 18, 1994) is a Russian and Israeli actress. She is best known for her role in a romantic drama Ice (as Nadya Lapshina). Winner of the Golden Eagle Award (2019) for the best female movie role.

== Biography ==
Darya-Aglaya Tarasova was born in Saint Petersburg, the daughter of actress Kseniya Rappoport and businessman Viktor Tarasov. She studied at the St. Petersburg State University. She has never gone through actor's education.

She made her film debut in 2010, appearing in the short film "Konfetki" (Russian: Конфетки) as Dasha. In 2012, she was cast in the film "After School", where she played the role of Frida. In 2014, she gained recognition after appearing in one of the leading roles (Sofya Kalinina) in the television series "Interns". In 2018, she played her first leading role in a major film: "Ice", where Tarasova portrayed the injured figure skater Nadezhda Lapshina. Two years later, the sequel to the film was released. That same year, the actress appeared in the film "Deadly Illusions", and between 2020 and 2021, she starred in the television series "No Principles" alongside Pavel Derevyanko, Maksim Vitorgan, and Pavel Tabakov.

At the end of April 2022, the detective thriller "The Execution" directed by Lado Kvataniya was released, in which Tarasova played the role of a surviving victim of a serial killer.

== Arrest ==
On 5 September 2025, Tarasova was detained and charged with drug smuggling at Domodedovo Airport in Moscow after she was found to be carrying a vape cartridge containing cannabis oil. On October 30, 2025, the measure of restraint was extended until January 24, 2026. At the end of November, Tarasova was given a suspended sentence of three years and fined 200,000 rubles.

== Filmography ==
List of film credits
| Year | Title | Role | Notes |
|---|---|---|---|
| 2010 | Konfetki (9 May. Personal Relationship) | Dasha | (Short film, ru) |
| 2018 | Ice | Nadya Lapshina, the figure skater | |
| 2018 | Tanks | Lida Kataeva | (ru) |
| 2019 | Happiness Is... Part 2 | Tonya, short story 'Photo for Happiness' | |
| 2020 | The Marathon of Desires | Marina Gomynina | (ru) |
| 2020 | Ice 2 | Nadya Lapshina | |
| 2020 | Deadly Illusions | Katya | |
| 2021 | Till Lindemann: Ich hasse Kinder | Till's Wife | Short film |
| 2021 | The Execution | Kira | |
| 2024 | Serf 2 | Katya | |

List of television credits
| Year | Title | Role | Notes |
|---|---|---|---|
| 2012 | After School | Frida Lapshina | (ru) |
| 2014 | Heaters of Major Sokolov | Lyusya | (ru) |
| 2014 | Interns | Sofya Kalinina, intern, Kupitman's niece | |
| 2016 | Investigator Tikhonov | Galya, Tikhonov's daughter | (ru) |
| 2017 | Moscow Murders | Dasha | |
| 2018 | Shards | Ulyana | |
| 2018 | An Ordinary Woman | Svetlana | (ru) |
| 2018 | Operation Muhabbat | Anya | |
| 2019 | The Foundling | Anna Andreyevna Kalinina, leytenant militsii | |

== Personal life ==
From 2014 to 2016, Aglaya Tarasova was in a relationship with actor Ilya Glinnikov, with whom she starred in the series "Interns".

From 2016 to 2018, she dated Serbian actor Miloš Biković, her co-star in "Ice".

From 2018 to 2020, she was in a relationship with American director Darren Aronofsky.
