= Golden Eagle Award (Russia) =

Russian film and television award

- The Golden Eagle statue
- Awarded for: Excellence in cinematic achievements
- Country: Russia
- Presented by: National Academy of Motion Pictures Arts and Sciences of Russia
- First award: 25 January 2003
- Website: Official site of the National Academy of Motion Pictures Arts and Sciences of Russia

The Golden Eagle Award (Russian: премия Золотой Орёл, romanized: premiya Zolotoy Oryol) is an award given by the National Academy of Motion Pictures Arts and Sciences of Russia to recognize excellence of professionals in the film industry, directors, actors, and writers. Modelled after the American Golden Globe Awards, the formal ceremony at which the awards are presented is one of the most prominent award ceremonies in Russia, alongside the Nika Award.

The national Russian award is given out in 24 categories each January for motion pictures and TV series produced in Russia during the previous year. The awarding statuette is a silver eagle, originally made from copper with a jade pedestal, and was designed by sculptor Viktor Mitroshin. The design was later altered by the Spanish company Carrera y Carrera. The award was conceived by Nikita Mikhalkov as a counterweight to the Nika Award established in 1987 and run by the Russian Academy of Cinema Arts and Sciences in Moscow.

== History ==
The Golden Eagle Award was founded on 4 March 2002 by the National Academy of Motion Picture Arts and Sciences of Russia. At the XXIV Moscow International Film Festival on 26 June 2002, the Golden Eagle was officially inaugurated by the National Academy of Cinematographic Sciences. Winners were Andrei Tarkovsky, George Zhzhyonov, Fyodor Khitruk, Tatiana Samoilova, Michel Legrand, and Bernardo Bertolucci. The Golden Eagle Award was modelled by film director Nikita Mihalkov after the Golden Globe Awards as a counterweight to the Nika Award, established in 1987 and run by the Russian Academy of Cinema Arts and Sciences in Moscow.

On 20 September 2002, the declaration of the first nominees took place in a press conference at the Union of Cinematographers. However, the ceremony of the cinema, scheduled for 27 September 2002, was transferred in connection with the death of Sergei Bodrov, Jr. and his crew, who died in the Karmadon Gorge. As a result, the first award ceremony was held on 25 January 2003.

== Design ==
Originally, the "Golden Eagle" statue was made from copper with golden alloy around it and its pedestal from jade. It was created by sculptor Viktor Mitroshin, but later altered by the Spanish company Carrera y Carrera, which is based in Madrid. People of eight different professions, including the designer and polisher, manufacture each instance in about 55 hours.

== Award categories ==
The Golden Eagle Award consists of 24 merit awards for films from the previous year, as well as honorary special awards for lifetime achievement.

=== Current categories ===
- Best Feature Film
- Best Streaming Series (since 2021)
- Best Television Series
- Best Nonfiction Film
- Best Short Film (с 2016)
- Best Animated Feature Film
- Best Director
- Best Screenplay
- Best Leading Actress in Film
- Best Actress in Streaming Series (since 2022)
- Best Actress on Television (since 2003)
- Best Leading Actor in Film
- Best Actor in Streaming Series (since 2022)
- Best Actor on Television (since 2003)
- Best Supporting Actress
- Best Supporting Actor
- Best Cinematography
- Best Art Direction
- Best Costume Design
- Best Music Score
- Best Film Editing
- Best Sound Engineer
- Best Visual Effects (с 2016)
- "Golden Egle" Special awards

=== Retired awards ===
- Best TV Movie or Mini-Series (2003—2021)
- Best Makeup and Special Prosthetic Makeup Effects (2017—2022)
- Best Foreign Language Film (2003—2021)
