= National Media Group =

Russian media company

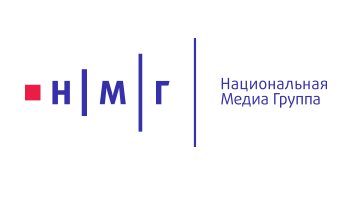
- Company type: Joint-stock company
- Founded: 2008; 18 years ago
- Headquarters: Moscow, Russia
- Industry: Mass media
- Website: www.nmg.ru

National Media Group (Russian: Национальная Медиа Группа, romanized: Natsionalnaya Media Gruppa) is a private media conglomerate in Russia. It was founded in 2008 by Russian oligarch Yuri Kovalchuk, a close associate of president Vladimir Putin. The company's board of directors is chaired by Alina Kabaeva.

== Assets ==
As of 2023, National Media Group holds a majority ownership in the following media assets. Besides these, it owns several other companies related to content production and distribution.

=== Television ===
- REN TV
- Channel 5
- Channel One
- STS Media
  - STS
  - Domashny
  - STS Kids
  - STS Love
  - Che
- Channel 78
- Media1
  - Muz-TV
  - Solntse
  - yu

=== Newspapers ===
- Izvestia
- Delovoy Peterburg
- Sport Express

National Media Group additionally has a minority stake in Channel One, and in partnership with Rostelecom it runs the paid television channel Media-Telecom and the online video platform Wink.
