= Golden Eagle Award for Best Cinematography =

Annual Russian film award

- Awarded for: Best Cinematography of the Year
- Country: Russia
- Presented by: National Academy of Motion Pictures Arts and Sciences of Russia
- First award: 2002
- Currently held by: Maksim Shinkorenko in Soviet Union's love (Lyubov Sovetskogo Soyuza, 2024)
- Website: Official site of the National Academy of Motion Picture Arts and Sciences of Russia

The Golden Eagle Award for Best Cinematography (Russian: Золотой Орёл за лучшую операторскую работу в кино) is one of twenty award categories presented annually by the National Academy of Motion Pictures Arts and Sciences of Russia. It is one of the Golden Eagle Awards, which were conceived by Nikita Mikhalkov as a counterweight to the Nika Award established in 1987 by the Russian Academy of Cinema Arts and Sciences.

Each year, the members of the academy choose three leading cinematographers and the film as a perception. The first cameraman to be awarded was Yuri Nevsky for the film The Star. The most recent award was made to Maksim Shinkorenko in Soviet Union's love (Lyubov Sovetskogo Soyuza, 2024).

== Nomineess and Awardees ==
Key

Sign	Meaning
**Bold**	Indicates the winner

=== 2000s ===
Year	Cinematographer	International title	Original title	Transliterated title (per BGN/PCGN standard)	Ref(s)
2002	**Yuri Nevsky**	The Star	Звезда	Zvezda	
2002	Sergey Astakhov	River	Река	Reka	
2002	Andrey Zhegalov	The Cuckoo	Кукушка	Kukushka	
2003	**Mikhail Krichman**	The Return	Возвращение	Vozvrashchenie	
2003	Aleksandr Antipenko	Little Lord Fauntleroy	Радости и печали маленького лорда	Radosti i pechali malen'kovo lorda	
2003	Yuri Klimenko, Pavel Kostomarov	The Stroll	Прогулка	Progulka	
2004	**Sergey Machilsky**	Our Own	Свои	Svoi	
2004	Ilya Dyomin	72 Meters	72 метра	72 metra	
2004	Sergey Trofimov	Night Watch	Ночной Дозор	Nochnoy Dozor	
2005	**Maksim Osadchy**	The 9th Company	9 рота	9 rota	
2005	Yuri Klimenko	Dreaming of Space	Космос как предчуствие	Kosmos kak predchustvie	
2005	Anatoly Lesnikov	First on the Moon	Первые на Луне	Pervye na Lune	
2006	**Andrey Zhegalov**	The Island	Остров	Ostrov	
2006	Andrey Naydyonov	Euphoria	Эйфория	Eyforiya	
2006	Sergey Trofimov	Day Watch	Дневной дозор	Dnevnoy dozor	
2007	**Vladimir Klimov**	Attack on Leningrad	Ленинград	Leningrad	
2007	Oleg Lukichev	Travelling with Pets	Путешествие с домашними животными	Puteshestvie s domashnimi zhivotnymi	
2007	Vladislav Opelyants	12	12	12	
2008	**Alexey Rodionov**, **Igor Grinyakin**	Admiral	Адмиралъ	Admiral	
2008	Shandor Berkeshi	The Vanished Empire	Исчезнувшая Империя	Ischeznuvshaya Imperiya	
2008	Oleg Lukichev	Yuri's Day	Юрьев день	Yuryev den	
2009	**Maksim Osadchy**	The Inhabited Island	Обитаемый остров	Obitayemyy ostrov	
2009	Sergey Astakhov, Yuri Klimenko	Anna Karenina	Анна Каренина	Anna Karenina	
2009	Roman Vasyanov	Stilyagi	Стиляги	Stilyagi	

=== 2010s ===
Year	Cinematographer	International title	Original title	Transliterated title (per BGN/PCGN standard)	Ref(s)
2010	**Pavel Kostomarov**	How I Ended This Summer	Как я провёл этим летом	Kak ya provyol etim letom	
2010	Yuri Klimenko	The Edge	Край	Kray	
2010	Mikhail Krichman	Silent Souls	Овсянки	Ovsyanki	
2011	**Mikhail Krichman**	Elena	Елена	Elena	
2011	Yuri Klimenko	The Female	Самка	Samka	
2011	Maksim Osadchy	Two Days	Два дня	Dva dnya	
2012	**Yuri Raysky**	The Horde	Орда	Orda	
2012	Denis Alarkon	Spy	Шпион	Shpion	
2012	Fyodor Lyass	Soulless	Духless	Dukhless	
2013	**Maksim Osadchy**	Stalingrad	Сталинград	Stalingrad	
2013	Dmitrij Gribanov	Kiss Them All!	Горько!	Gor'ko!	
2014	**Vladislav Opelyants**	Sunstroke	Солнечный удар	Solnechnyy udar	
2014	Mikhail Krichman	Leviathan	Левиафан	Leviafan	
2014	Yuri Klimenko	Weekend	Weekend	Weekend	
2015	**Yuriy Korol**	Battle for Sevastopol	Битва за Севастополь	Bitva za Sevastopol'	
2015	Ilya Averbakh	Battalion	Батальонъ	Batal'on"	
2015	Vladislav Opelyants	The Warrior	Воин	Voin	
2016	**Maksim Osadchy**	The Duelist	Дуэлянт	Dujeljant	
2016	Vladislav Opelyants	The Student	Ученик	Uchenik	
2016	Aleksandr Simonov	Paradise	Рай	Ray	
2017	**Igor Grinyakin**	Viking	Викинг	Viking	
2017	Alisher Hamidhodzhaev	Arrhythmia	Аритмия	Aritmiya	
2017	Mikhail Krichman	Loveless	Нелюбовь	Nelyubov'	
2018	**Igor Grinyakin**	Going Vertical	Движение вверх	Dvizheniye vverkh	
2018	Alisher Hamidhodzhaev	Anna's War	Война Анны	Voyna Anny	
2018	Mikhail Milashin	Ice	Лёд	Lod	
2019	**Roman Vasyanov**	Odessa	Одесса	Odessa	
2019	Ksenia Sereda	Beanpole	Дылда	Dylda	
2019	Mikhail Milashin	T-34	Т-34	Т-34	

=== 2020s ===
Year	Cinematographer	International title	Original title	Transliterated title (per BGN/PCGN standard)	Ref(s)
2020	**Igor Grinyakin**	Union of Salvation	Союз спасения	Soyuz spaseniya	
2020	Mikhail Milashin	On the Edge	На острие	Na ostriye	
2020	Morad Abdel-Fattakh	Streltsov	Стрельцов	Strel'tsov	
