= Alfyorov =

Alfyorov or Alferov (Russian: Алфёров, Russian pronunciation: [ɐlˈfʲɵrəf]) is a Russian masculine surname derived from the given name Yelevfery; its feminine counterpart is Alfyorova or Alferova. The surname may refer to:

- Aleksandr Alfyorov (born 1962), Russian football player and coach
- Irina Alfyorova (born 1951), Russian actress
- Ksenia Alfyorova (born 1974), Russian theatre and film actress, TV presenter
- Viktor Alfyorov (born 1977), Russian theatrical director and actor
- Yevgeni Alfyorov (born 1995), Russian football player
- Zhores Alferov (1930–2019), Russian physicist
  - 3884 Alferov (1977 EM1), asteroid named after Zhores
