= Golden Eagle Award for Best Leading Actor (Russia) =

Annual Russian film award

- Awarded for: Best Leading Actor of the Year
- Country: Russia
- Presented by: National Academy of Motion Pictures Arts and Sciences of Russia
- First award: 2002
- Currently held by: Sergey Bezrukov in Air (Воздух, 2024)
- Website: Official site of the National Academy of Motion Picture Arts and Sciences of Russia

The Golden Eagle Award for Best Leading Actor (Russian: Премия «Золотой Орёл» за лучшую мужскую роль в кино, romanized: Premiya «Zolotoy Oryol» za luchshuyu muzhskuyu rol v kino) is one of twenty four award categories presented annually by the National Academy of Motion Pictures Arts and Sciences of Russia. It is one of the Golden Eagle Awards, which were conceived by Nikita Mikhalkov as a counterweight to the Nika Award established in 1987 by the Russian Academy of Cinema Arts and Sciences.

Each year the members of the academy choose three leading actors as nominees for this Award. The first actor to be awarded was Viktor Bychkov for the film The Cuckoo. The most recent award was made to Sergey Bezrukov in Air (Воздух, 2024). Yevgeny Mironov, Sergei Garmash, Nikita Mikhalkov, Konstantin Khabensky, Vladimir Mashkov, and Fyodor Bondarchuk are the most successful artists, winning twice each. Other noteworthy actors who were nominated at least twice are Aleksei Petrenko, Danila Kozlovsky, Bohdan Stupka, Viktor Sukhorukov, Aleksandr Baluev, Yevgeny Tsyganov, Sergei Makovetsky, Sergei Puskepalis, Aleksei Serebryakov, Maksim Matveyev, and Alexander Petrov.

== Nomineess and Awardees ==
Key

Sign	Meaning
†	The international title is not known
**Bold**	Indicates the winner

=== 2000s ===
Year	Actor	International title	Original title	Transliterated title (per BGN/PCGN standard)	Ref(s)
2002	**Viktor Bychkov**	The Cuckoo	Кукушка	Kukushka	
2002	Aleksei Petrenko	The Mastermind	Коллекционер	Kollektsioner	
2002	Aleksey Chadov	War	Война	Voina	
2003	**Yevgeny Mironov**	The Idiot	Идиот	Idiot	
2003	Sergey Bezrukov	Brigada	Бригада	Brigada	
2003	Viktor Sukhorukov	Poor Poor Paul	Бедный бедный Павел	Bedny bedny Pavel	
2004	**Sergei Garmash**	Our Own	Свои	Svoi	
2004	Vladimir Mashkov	Daddy	Папа	Papa	
2004	Bohdan Stupka	Our Own	Свои	Svoi	
2005	**Nikita Mikhalkov**	The State Counsellor	Статский советник	Statskiy sovetnik	
2005	Yevgeny Mironov	Dreaming of Space	Космос как предчуствие	Kosmos kak predchustvie	
2005	Mikhail Porechenkov	The 9th Company	9 рота	9 rota	
2006	**Pyotr Mamonov**	The Island	Остров	Ostrov	
2006	Aleksandr Baluev	La Traductrice	Игра слов: Переводчица олигарха	Igra slov: Perevodchitsa oligarkha	
2006	Yevgeny Tsyganov	Piter FM	Питер FM	Piter FM	
2007	**Sergei Makovetsky**, **Nikita Mikhalkov**, **Sergei Garmash**, **Valentin Gaft**, **Aleksei Petrenko**, **Yuri Stoyanov**, **Sergei Gazarov**, **Mikhail Yefremov**, **Oleksiy Gorbunov**, **Sergei Artsibashev**, **Viktor Verzhbitsky**, **Roman Madyanov**	12	12	12	
2007	Viktor Sukhorukov	(unknown)†	Агитбригада «Бей врага!»	Agitbrigada "Bey vraga!"	
2007	Fyodor Bondarchuk	Vice	Тиски	Tiski	
2008	**Konstantin Khabensky**	Admiral	Адмиралъ	Admiral	
2008	Oleg Dolin	Wild Field	Дикое поле	Dikoe pole	
2008	Danila Kozlovsky	Black Hunters	Мы из будущего	My iz budushchevo	
2009	**Bohdan Stupka**	Taras Bulba	Тарас Бульба	Taras Bul'ba	
2009	Vladimir Ilyin	Ward No. 6	Палата № 6	Palata No. 6	
2009	Sergei Makovetsky (Note: Initially Oleg Yankovsky was to be nominated, but instead he received the Special Award for his contributions in the last years. He was replaced by Sergei Makovetsky.)	The Priest	Поп	Pop	

=== 2010s ===
Year	Actor	International title	Original title	Transliterated title (per BGN/PCGN standard)	Ref(s)
2010	**Vladimir Mashkov**	The Edge	Край	Kray	
2010	Sergei Puskepalis	How I Ended This Summer	Как я провёл этим летом	Kak ya provyol etim letom	
2010	Aleksandr Baluev	Kandagar	Кандагар	Kandagar	
2011	**Fyodor Bondarchuk**	Two Days	Два дня	Dva dnya	
2011	Sergei Garmash	Home	Дом	Dom	
2011	Aleksei Serebryakov	The PyraMMMid	ПираМММида	PiraMMMida	
2012	**Danila Kozlovsky**	Soulless	Духless	Dukhless	
2012	Fyodor Bondarchuk	Spy	Шпион	Shpion	
2012	Maksim Sukhanov	The Horde	Орда	Orda	
2013	**Konstantin Khabensky**	The Geographer Drank His Globe Away	Географ глобус пропил	Geograf globus propil	
2013	Sergei Puskepalis	Metro	Метро	Metro	
2013	Danila Kozlovsky	Legend No. 17	Легенда № 17	Legenda № 17	
2014	**Aleksandr Zbruyev**	The Film About Alekseyev	Кино про Алексеева	Kino pro Alekseyeva	
2014	Maksim Matveyev	Weekend	Weekend [Уик-энд]	Weekend [Uik-end]	
2014	Aleksei Serebryakov	Leviathan	Левиафан	Leviafan	
2015	**Fyodor Bondarchuk**	Ghost	Призрак	Prizrak	
2015	Yevgeny Tsyganov	Battle for Sevastopol	Битва за Севастополь	Bitva za Sevastopol'	
2015	Ivan Kolesnikov	The End of a Great Era	Конец прекрасной эпохи	Konets Prekrasnoy Epokhi	
2016	**Ivan Yankovsky**	The Queen of Spades	Дама Пик	Dama Pik	
2016	Danila Kozlovsky	Flight Crew	Экипаж	Ekipazh	
2016	Pyotr Fyodorov	The Duelist	Дуэлянт	Dujeljant	
2017	**Yevgeny Mironov**	The Age of Pioneers	Время первых	Vremya Pervykh	
2017	Aleksandr Yatsenko	Arrhythmia	Аритмия	Aritmiya	
2017	Vladimir Vdovichenkov	Salyut 7	Салют-7	Salyut-7	
2018	**Vladimir Mashkov**	Going Vertical	Движение вверх	Dvizheniye Vverkh	
2018	Alexander Petrov	Gogol. Viy	Гоголь. Вий	Gogol. Viy	
2018	Alexander Petrov	Ice	Лёд	Lod	
2019	**Alexander Petrov**	Text	Текст	Tekst	
2019	Yuri Borisov	The Bull	Бык	Byk	
2019	Alexander Petrov	Т-34	Т-34	Т-34	

=== 2020s ===
Year	Actor	International title	Original title	Transliterated title (per BGN/PCGN standard)	Ref(s)
2020	**Yuri Borisov**	AK-47	Калашников	Kalashnikov	
2020	Maksim Matveyev	Union of Salvation	Союз спасения	Soyuz Spaseniya	
2020	Alexander Petrov	Streltsov	Стрельцов	Strel'tsov	
2021	**Filipp Yankovsky**	100 Minutes	Иван Денисович	Ivan Denisovich	
2021	Yuri Borisov	Captain Volkonogov Escaped	Капитан Волконогов бежал	Kapitan Volkonogov bezhal)	
2021	Konstantin Khabensky	Fire	Огонь	Ogon	
2022	**Ivan Yankovsky**	Champion of the World	Чемпион мира	Chempion mira	
2022	Nikita Efremov	Intensive Care	Здоровый человек	Zdorovyy chelovek	
2022	Anton Momot	First Oscar	Первый Оскар	Pervyy Oskar	
2023	**Aleksandr Yatsenko**	The Righteous	Праведник	Pravednik	
2023	Yevgeny Tsyganov	1993	1993	1993	
2023	Makar Khlebnikov, Oleg Savostyuk	Three Minutes of Silence	Снегирь	Snegir	
2024	**Sergey Bezrukov**	Air	Воздух	Air	
2024	Roman Vasilyev	Love of the Soviet Union	Любовь Советского Союза	Lyubov’ Sovetskogo Soyuza	
2024	Aleksandr Yatsenko	Abnormal	Ненормальный	Nenormal’nyy	

== Gallery ==
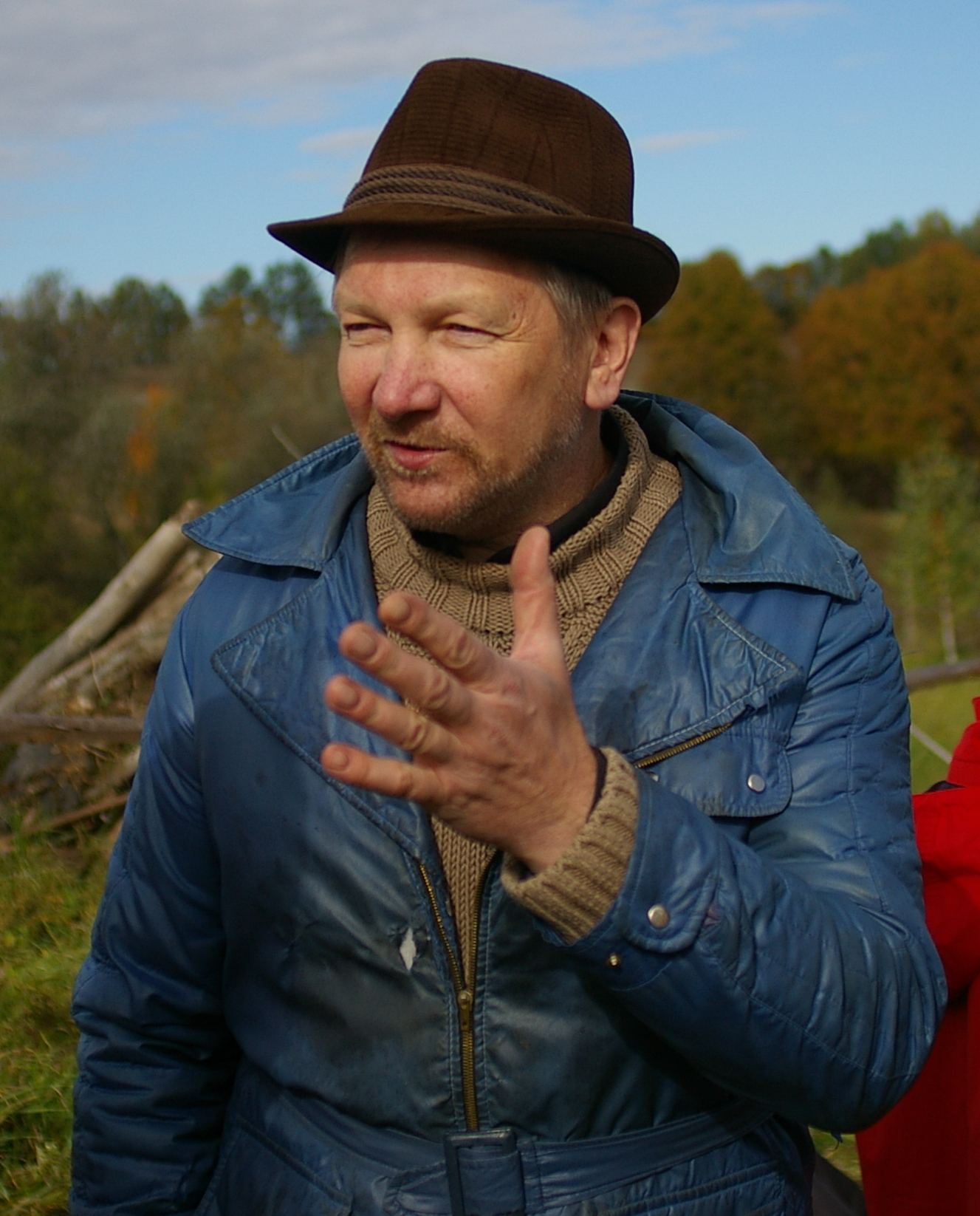
Viktor Bychkov

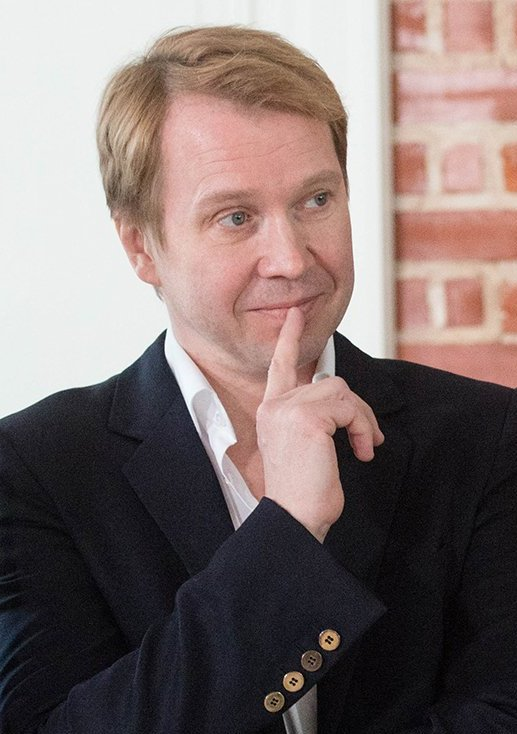
Yevgeny Mironov

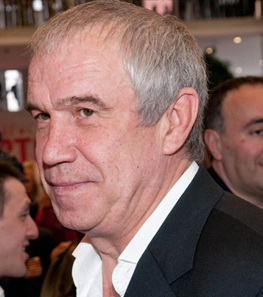
Sergei Garmash

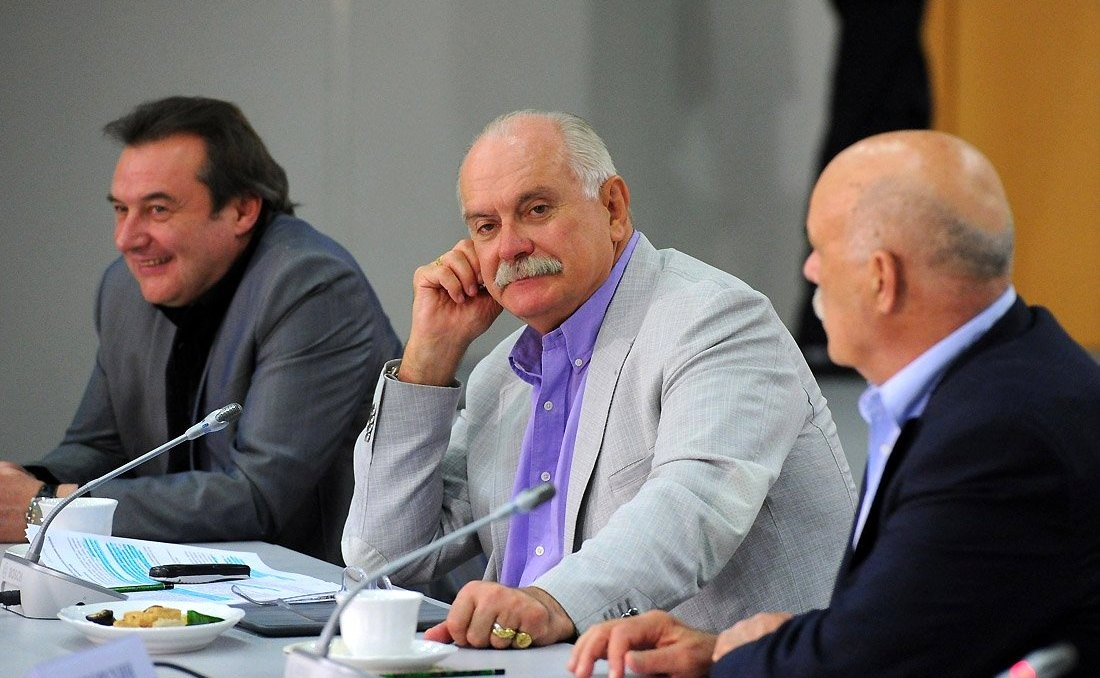
Nikita Mikhalkov

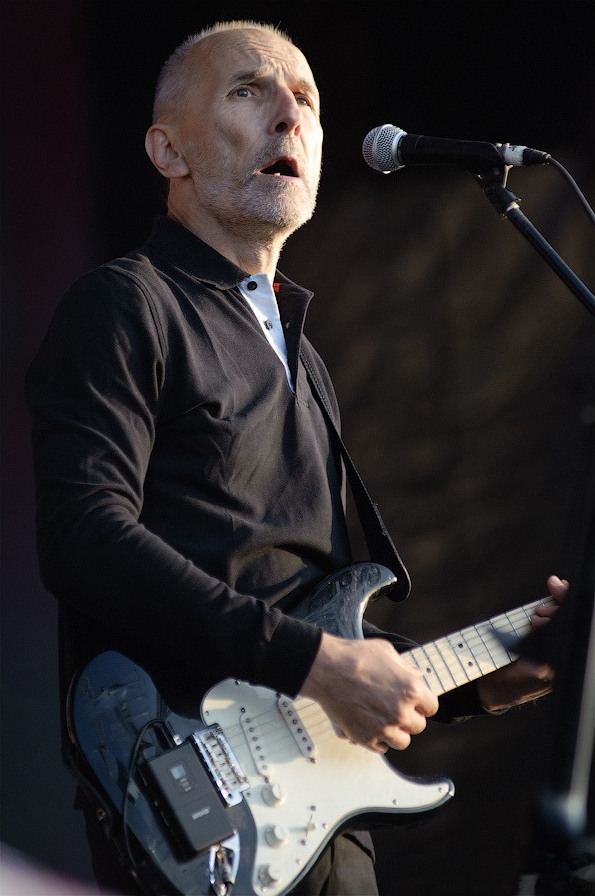
Pyotr Mamonov

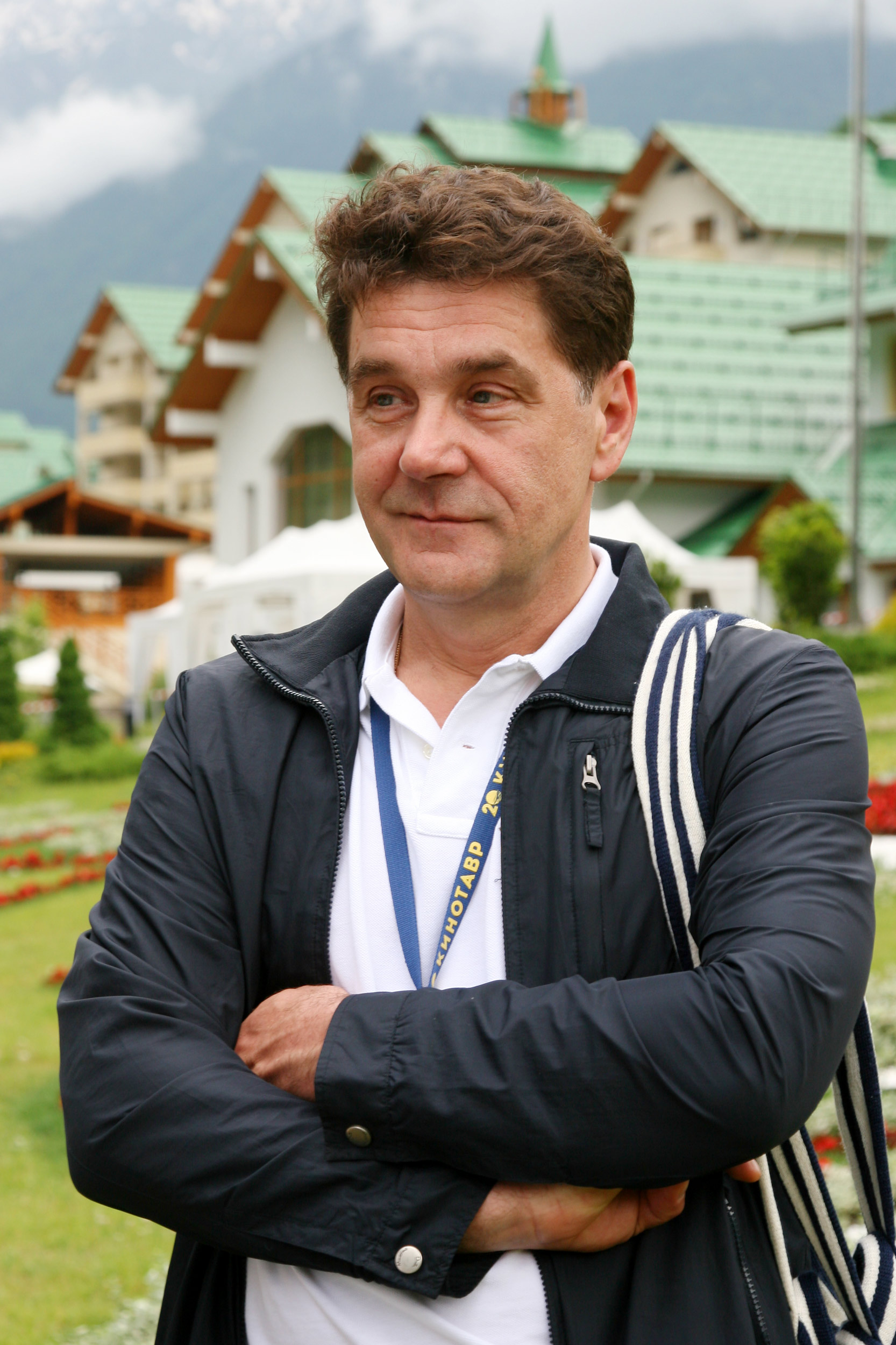
Sergei Makovetsky

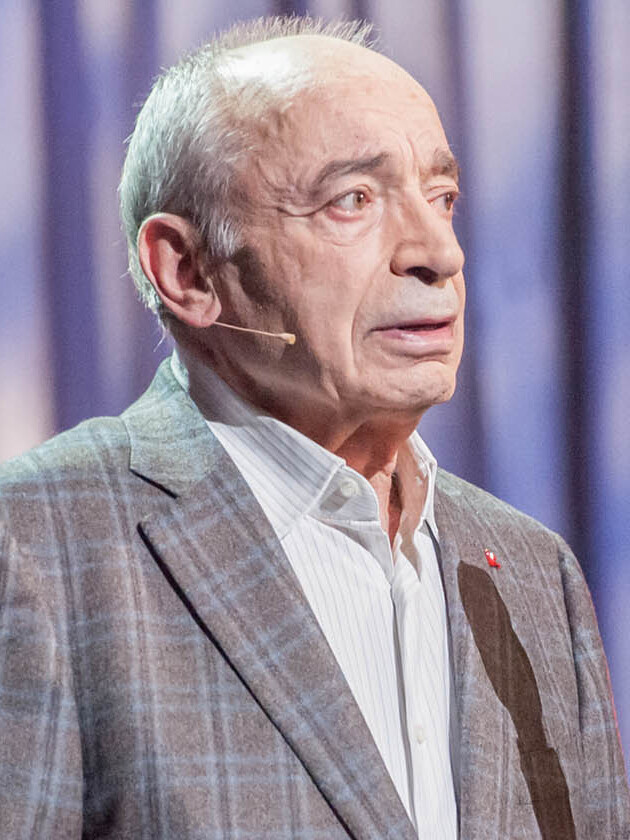
Valentin Gaft

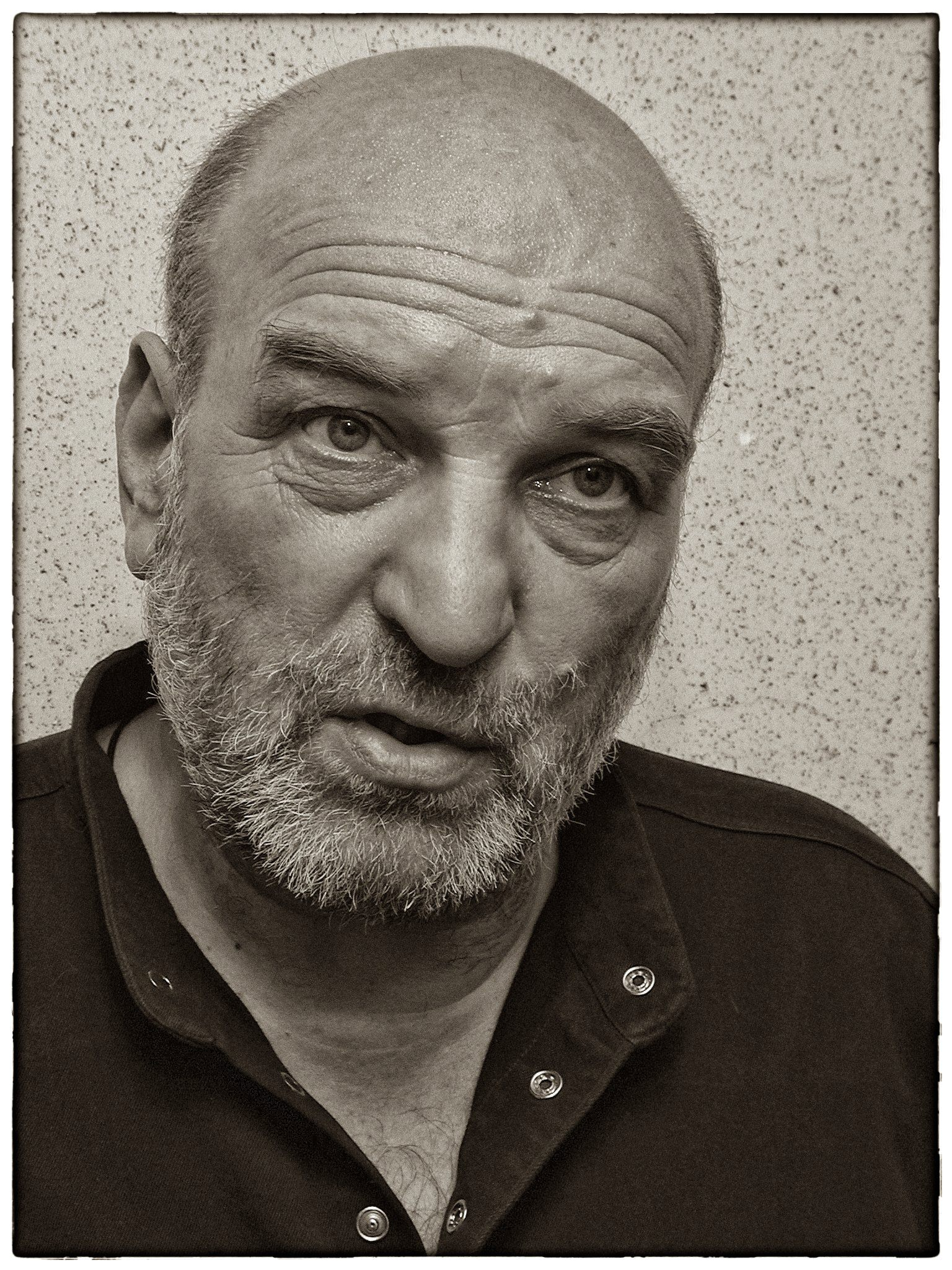
Aleksei Petrenko

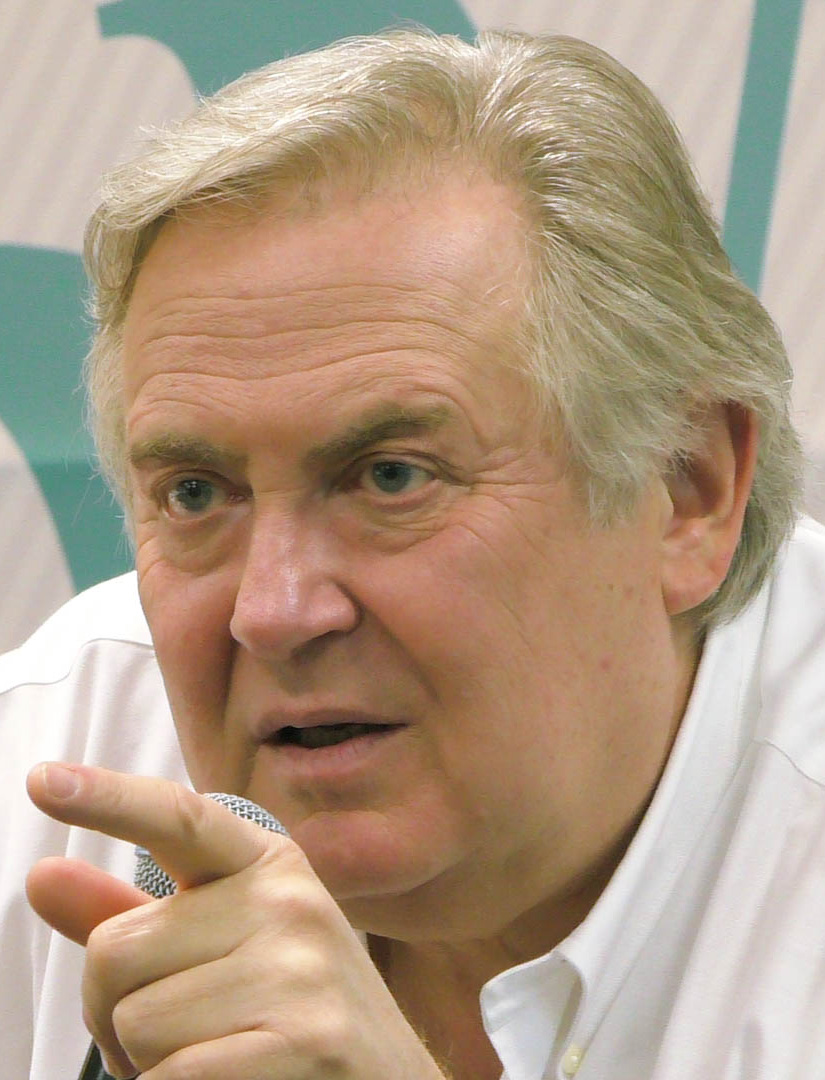
Yuri Stoyanov

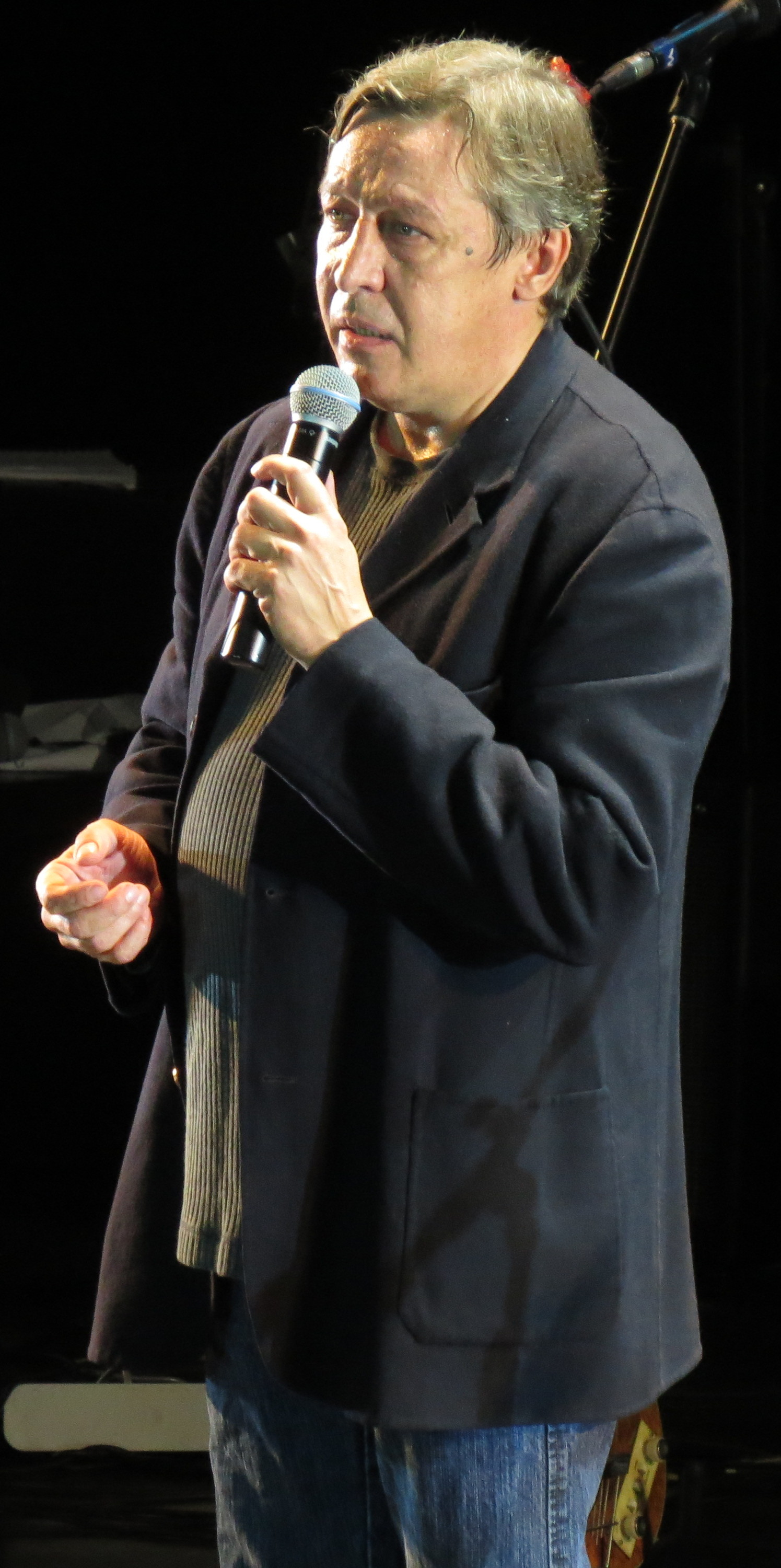
Mikhail Yefremov

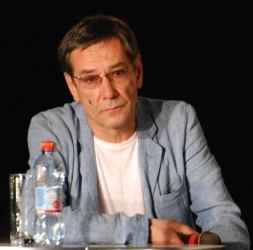
Oleksiy Gorbunov

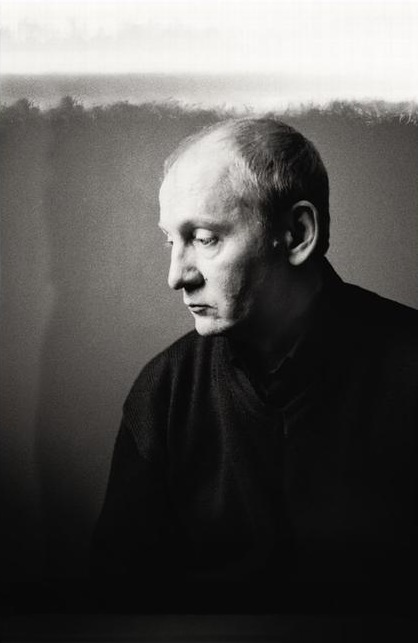
Viktor Verzhbitsky

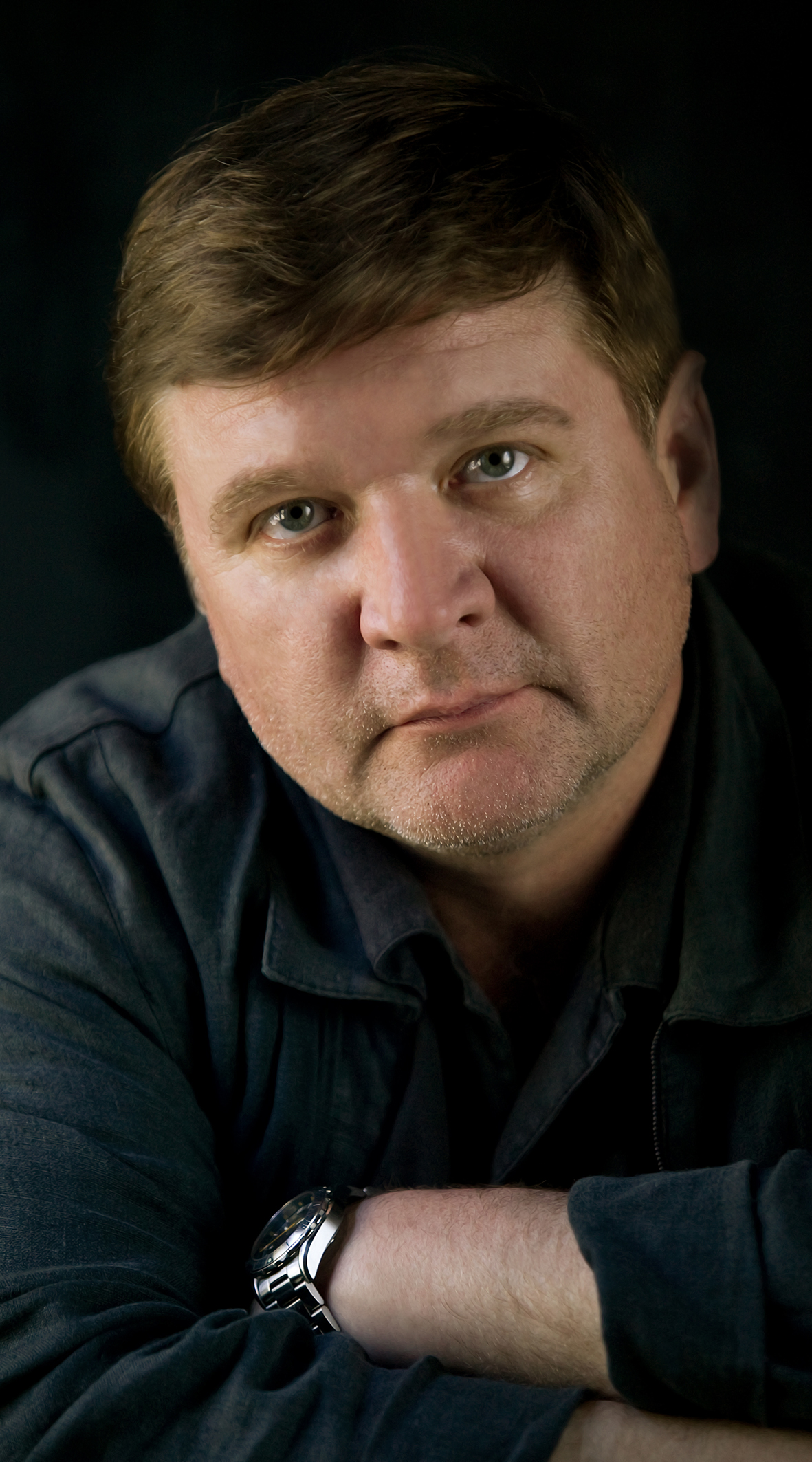
Roman Madyanov

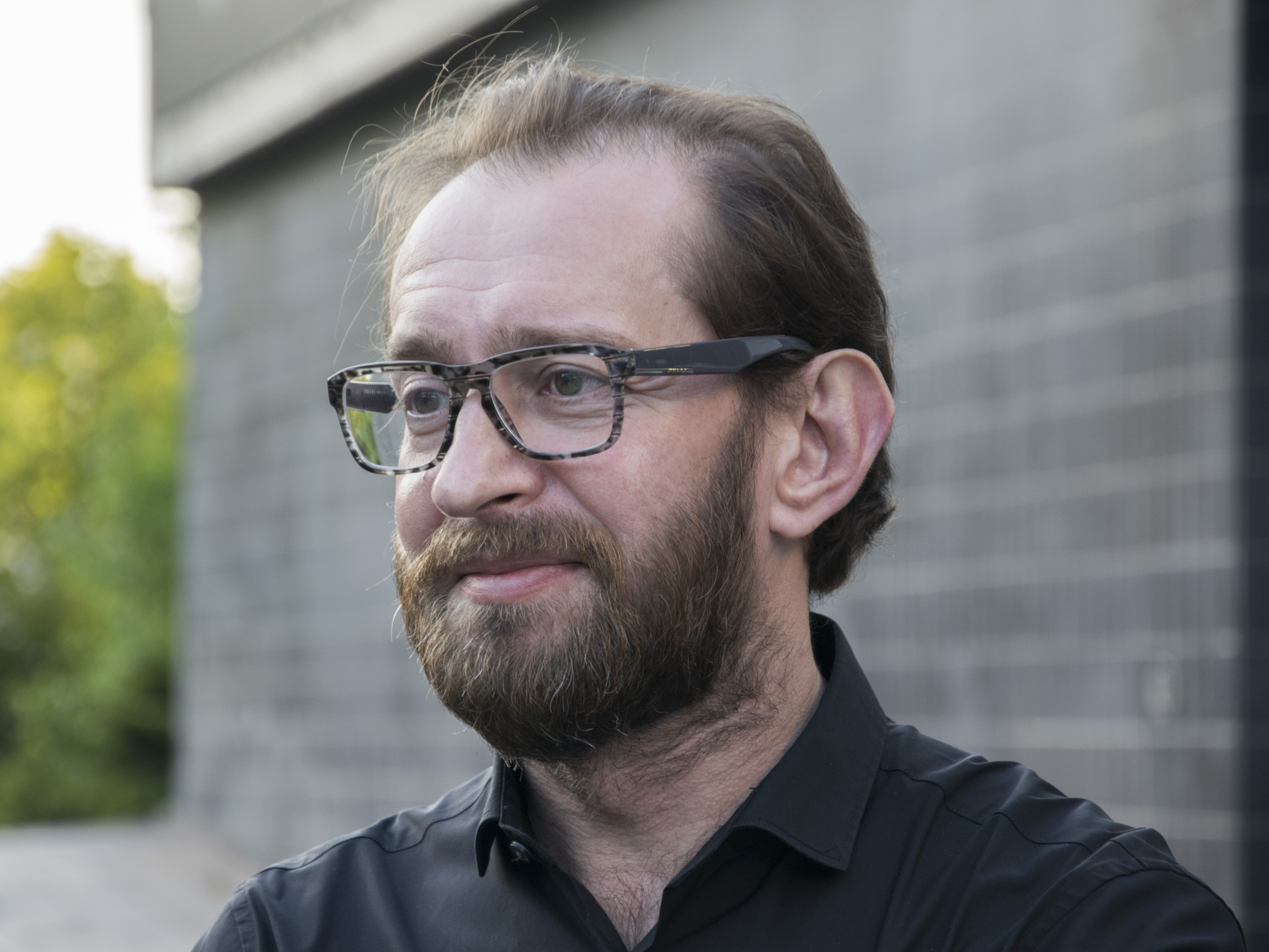
Konstantin Khabensky

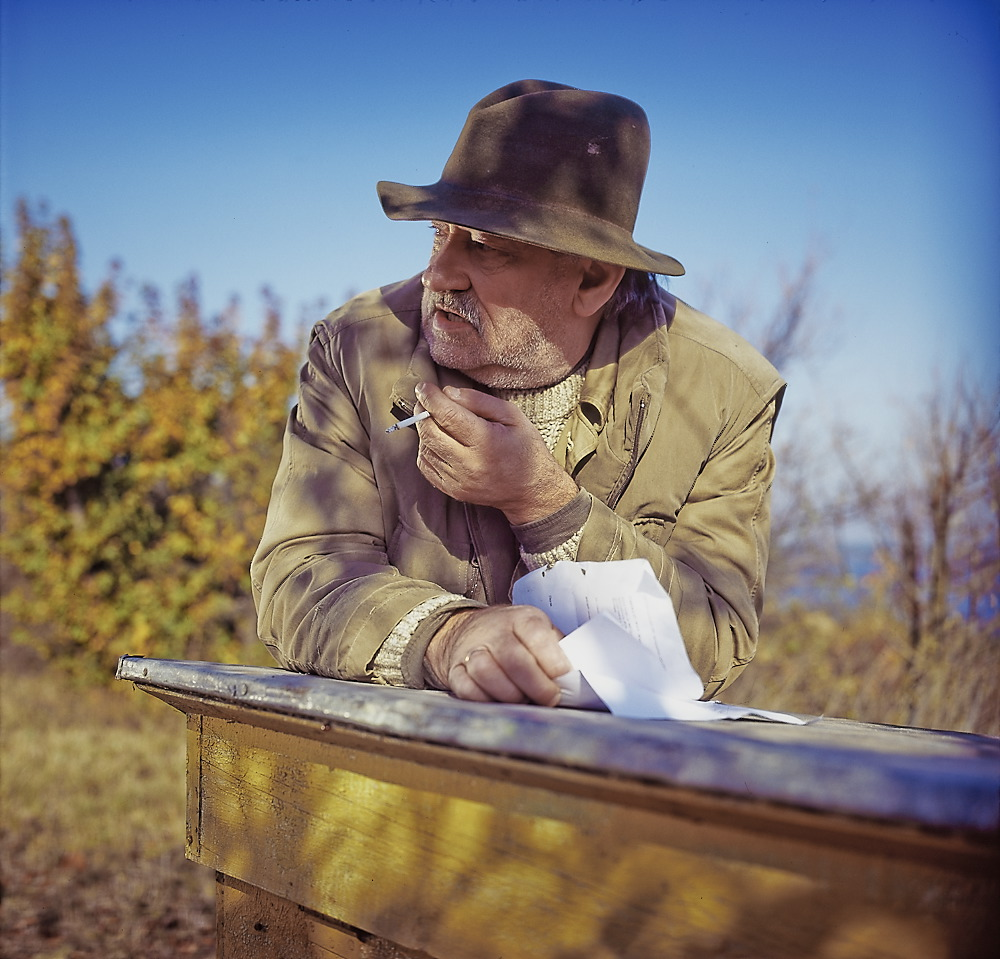
Bohdan Stupka

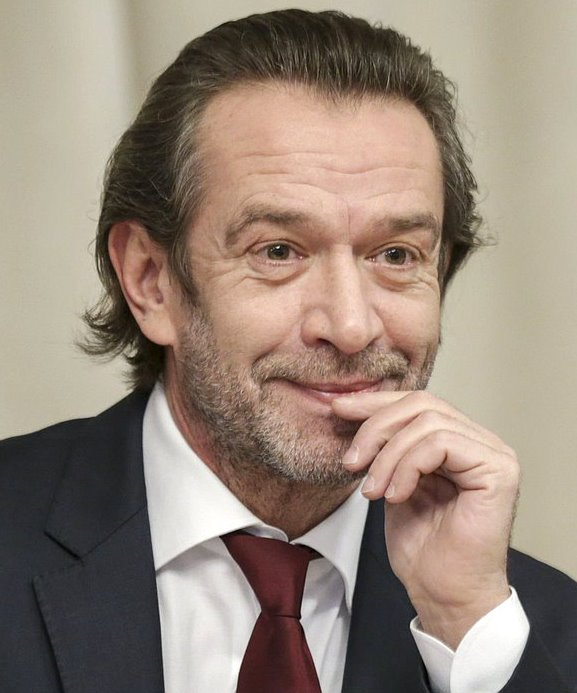
Vladimir Mashkov

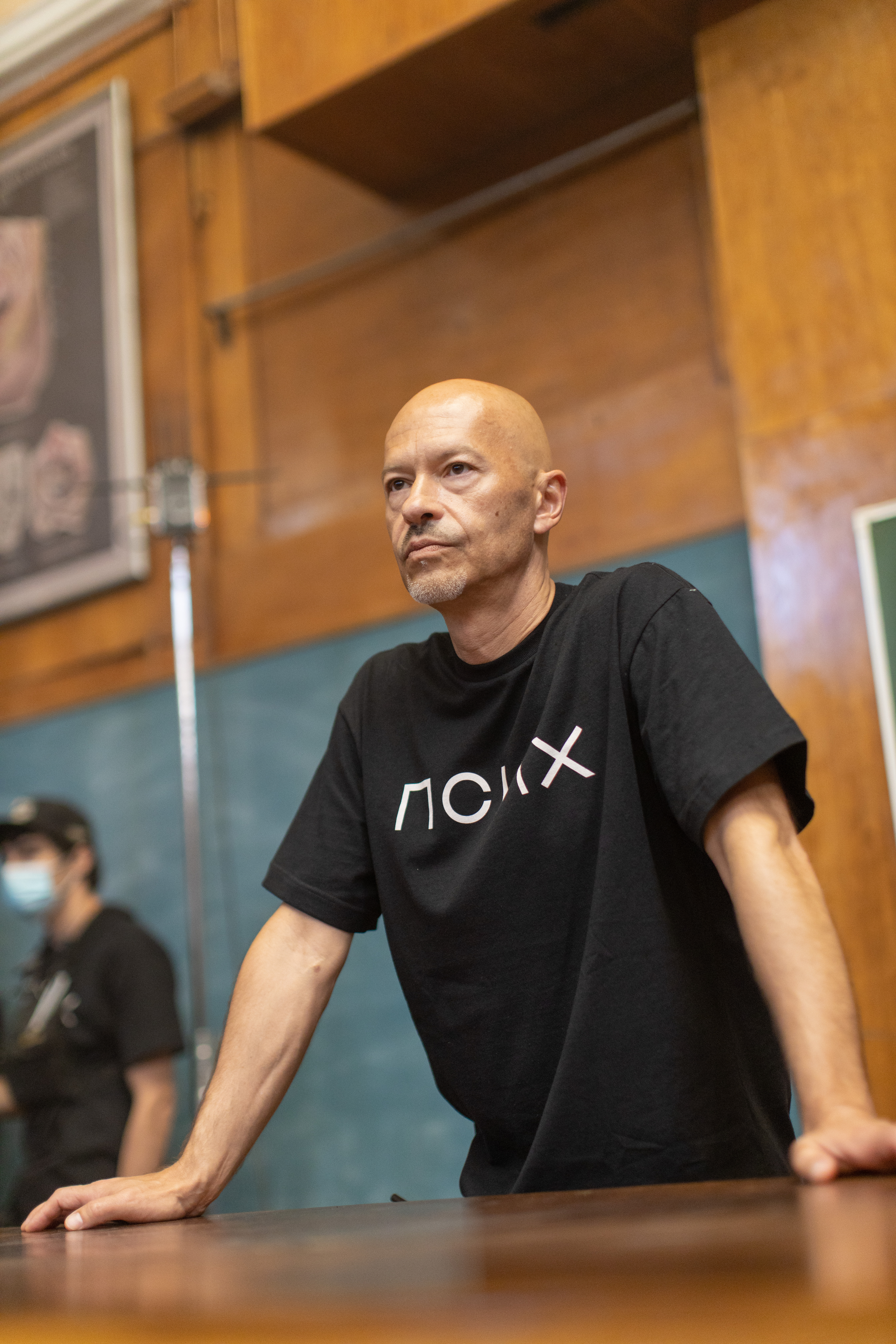
Fyodor Bondarchuk

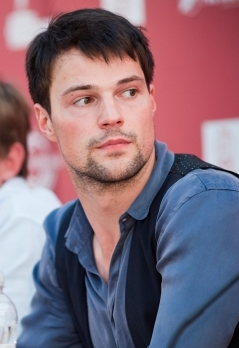
Danila Kozlovsky

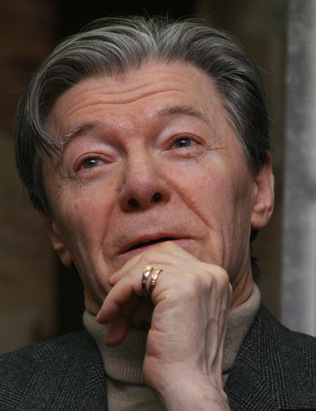
Aleksandr Zbruyev

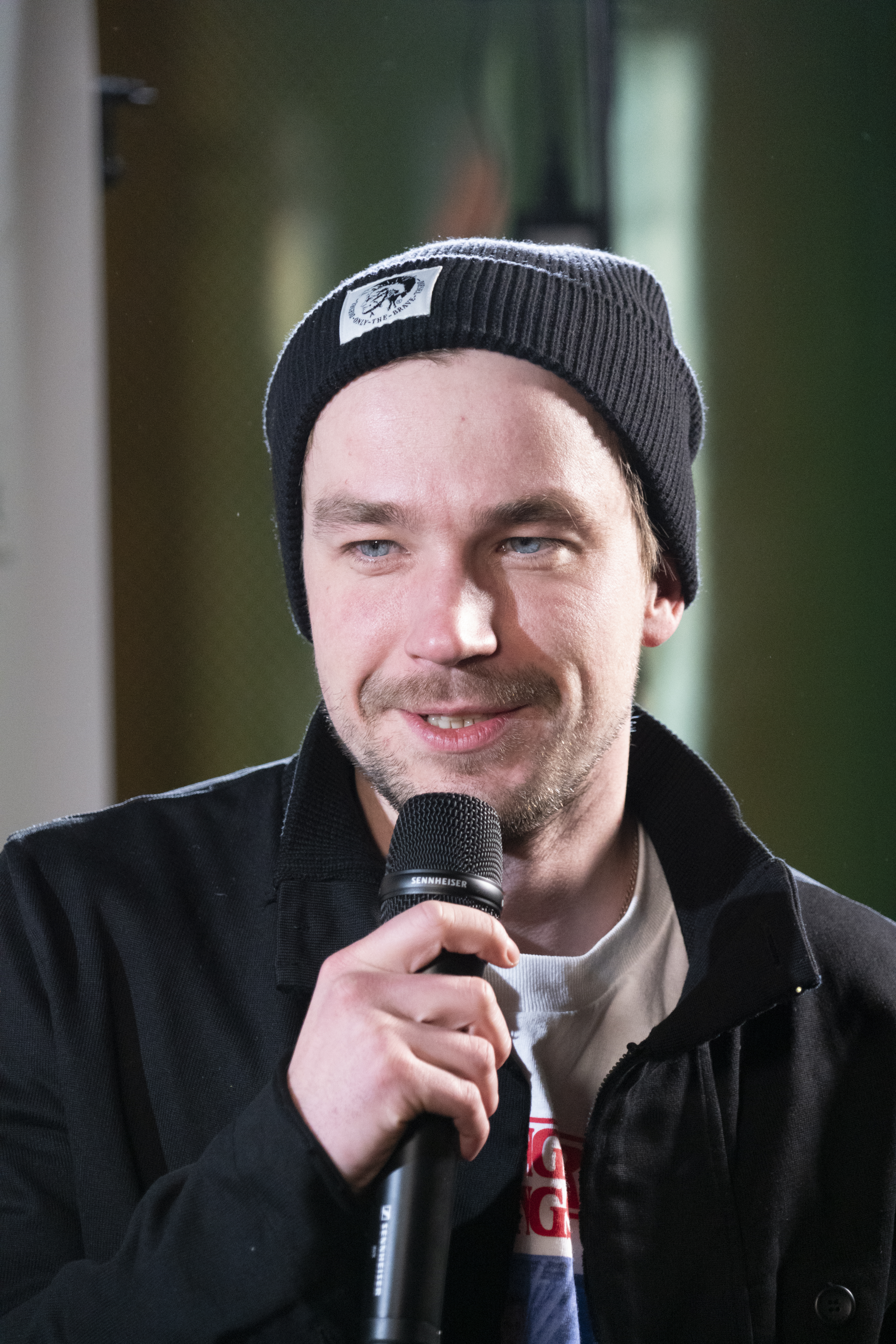
Alexander Petrov
