= Trigger (Russian TV series) =

Russian psychological thriller television series

- Genre: Drama; Crime thriller; Psychological thriller
- Developed by: Dmitry Tiurin
- Starring: Maksim Matveyev; Svetlana Ivanova; Yan Tsapnik
- Composer: Ryan Otter
- Country of origin: Russia
- Original language: Russian
- No. of seasons: 3
- No. of episodes: 40

Production
- Producer: Aleksandr Tsekalo
- Production location: Moscow
- Camera setup: Single-camera
- Running time: 46–84 minutes
- Production company: Sreda

Original release
- Network: Channel One Russia
- Release: February 10, 2020 – present

Trigger (Russian: Триггер) is a Russian television series produced by Sreda Film Productions. Starring Maksim Matveyev.

== Premise ==
Artyom Streletsky is an eccentric psychotherapist who has developed his own so-called "provocative therapy" method. Unlike his colleagues who spend months listening to their clients' complaints, Artyom uses various provocations, activating in the clients' psyche the desire to solve their problems in just a couple of sessions. His career as a psychotherapist flourishes until one of his clients commits suicide. Streletsky is accused of instigating the death and is sentenced to eight years in prison. After serving half of his sentence and being released from prison on parole, he resumes his psychological practice and tries to independently investigate the criminal case that landed him in prison.

== Cast ==
- Maksim Matveyev as Artyom
- Svetlana Ivanova as Dasha
- Yan Tsapnik as Igor
- Igor Kostolevsky as Artyom's father
- Daniil Vorobyov as Nikolai
- Leonid Bichevin as Leonid
- Andrey Merzlikin as Pyotr Sergeevich
- Aleksey Rozin as Roman
- Svetlana Ustinova as Vera
- Irina Starshenbaum as Maya
- Maxim Stoyanov as Sergei
- Mariya Andreyeva as Nadia
- Svetlana Kuznetsova as Maria Atamanova
