= Tatiana Abramova =

Russian actress and singer (born 1975)

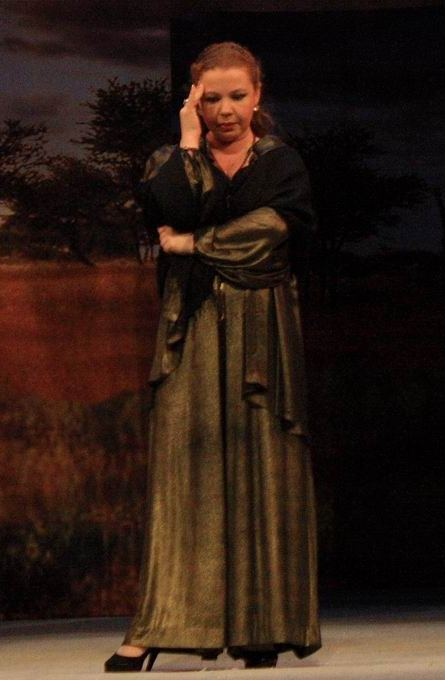
- Abramova on stage
- Born: Tatiana Albertovna Abramova; February 5, 1975 (age 51); Tyumen, RSFSR, USSR
- Occupations: Actress, singer, TV presenter
- Years active: 1994 — present

Tatiana Albertovna Abramova (Russian: Татья́на Альбе́ртовна Абра́мова; born February 5, 1975) is a Russian actress and singer.

== Early life and education ==
Tatiana Abramova was born in Tyumen, immediately after birth moved to Nizhnevartovsk. A few years later the family moved to Tyumen Abramovs where Tatiana graduated from music school.

After high school, she came to Moscow for entrance exams, but unexpectedly she came to St. Petersburg, where she remained.

== Career ==
In 1992, Tatiana took part in the pop contest Morning Star and in 1995 released her debut solo album Letter. In 1994 he participated in the festival Yalta-Moscow-transit (second prize), the contest station Europa Plus (Audience Award), Slavianski Bazaar in Vitebsk, and the contest of young performers Under the roofs of St. Petersburg, where once won Alla Pugacheva.

In 1996 she graduated from St. Petersburg University of Humanities as actor and director of drama theater.

She has been hosting a series of TV programs (Music Exam and Sharman Show, Russia-1).

== Personal life ==
She was married to photographer and cameraman Sergey Kulishenko two children. In May 2014 she married actor Yury Belyayev.

== Selected filmography ==
- 1999 Angelica as Leni
- 2001 Rostov-Daddy (TV series) as Syuzanna
- 2003 Always say Always (TV series) as Nadia Kudryashova
- 2003 Ivanov and Rabinovich (TV series) as Klavka Ivanova
- 2004 Knights of the Sea Stars (TV series) as Svetlana Bichutskaya
- 2005 The Insider (TV series) as Varya
- 2006 Stalin's Wife (Mini-series) as Anna Alliluyeva
- 2006 Ivan Podushkin. Gentleman Detective as Lucy
- 2006 Cool Games (TV) as Zhanna
- 2006 Russian Translation as secretary Marina Ryzhova
- 2007 Ivan Podushkin. Gentleman Detective (Mini-series) as Lucy
- 2010 Kiss Through a Wall as Roza Georginovna, editor
- 2014 Craftsmen (TV series) as Elena Klyuyeva
- 2015 The Alchemist (TV series) as Valentina
- 2022 Chainsaw Man (TV series) as Power
