= Mikhail Krichman =

Russian cinematographer

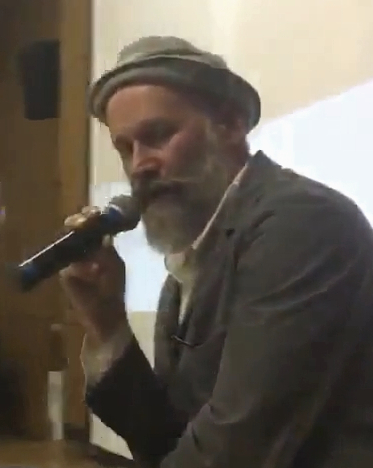
- Born: 17 June 1967 (age 59); Moscow, Russian SFSR, Soviet Union
- Occupation: Cinematographer
- Years active: 2000–present

Mikhail Krichman (Михаил Владимирович Кричман; born 1967) is a Russian cinematographer who received a Golden Osella award at the 67th Venice Film Festival for Silent Souls and 3 time award winner at Camerimage. Krichman is best known to western audiences for his work with renowned Russian director Andrey Zvyagintsev. He photographed all of Zvyagintsev's films, including The Return (2003), The Banishment (2007), Elena (2010), Leviathan (2014), Loveless (2017) and Minotaur (2026). Zvyagintsev claims that Krichman (an engineer by profession) learned his craft by reading American Cinematographer. Krichman also shot Miss Julie for Norwegian director Liv Ullmann.

== Style ==
Krichman’s cinematography plays a central role in shaping the atmosphere that defines Zvyagintsev’s emotionally intense films. Working primarily with crisp wide-angle compositions, he often contrasts the strained expressions of his characters with the stark yet striking Russian landscape. His imagery carries a palpable coldness, though it is tempered by a reflective, almost existential quality that lends the films a quiet sense of unease. Favoring 35mm film and an emphasis on natural light over artificial sources, Krichman frequently illuminates spaces before characters, situating them firmly within their environments. This approach enhances the realism of the scenes while reinforcing the emotional weight of the events unfolding on screen.

== Early life ==
His parents come from the field of book typesetting. After finishing his army service he did not know what to do with himself, and he chose the easiest path. He spent a lot of time in printing houses, and liked the smell of the paint. Those were the things from his childhood that made him start his studies at what is now Moscow State University of Printing Arts.

It was around 1991. He joined the department of technical studies, learning about the technology and the process of book printing. After third semester he moved to an extramural study program and started doing part-time jobs. And it so happened that he met a guy that was about to graduate from the cinematography department of the Gerasimov Institute of Cinematography. It was a birthday party, and he asked a question that probably a lot of people ask in a similar situation – would it be possible to visit a set and see how things work when they shoot a movie. Then after a year he got in touch, saying that he had an opportunity for Krichman to come and visit a set. That was how Krichman saw a film set for the first time – as he was directing and shooting some kind of a commercial.

== Selected filmography ==
- Sky. Plane. Girl (2002)
- The Return (2003)
- Poor Relatives (2005)
- Silent Souls (2010)
- The Banishment (2010)
- Elena (2011)
- Winter Journey (2013)
- Miss Julie (2014)
- Leviathan (2014)
- The Secret Scripture (2016)
- Loveless (2017)
- Vermiglio (2024)
- The End (2024)
- Minotaur (2026)

== Awards and nominations ==
List of awards and nominations
Award	Category	Year	Nominated work	Result	Ref.
Camerimage	Golden Frog	2026	Minotaur	Bronze Frog	
Camerimage	Golden Frog	2017	Loveless	Silver Frog	
Camerimage	Golden Frog	2014	Leviathan	Won	
Camerimage	Golden Frog	2010	Silent Souls	Silver Frog	
Camerimage	Golden Frog	2003	The Return	Nominated	
European Film Awards	Carlo di Palma European Film Award for Best Cinematographer	2017	Loveless	Won	
European Film Awards	Carlo di Palma European Film Award for Best Cinematographer	2007	The Banishment	Nominated	
Venice Film Festival	Golden Osella	2010	Silent Souls	Won	
Nika Awards	Best Cinematographer				
Nika Awards	Best Cinematographer	2018	Loveless	Nominated	
Nika Awards	Best Cinematographer	2015	Leviathan	Nominated	
Nika Awards	Best Cinematographer	2012	Elena	Won	
Nika Awards	Best Cinematographer	2011	Silent Souls	Nominated	
Nika Awards	Best Cinematographer	2008	The Banishment	Nominated	
Nika Awards	Best Cinematographer	2004	The Return	Won	
Golden Eagle Awards	Best Cinematography	2017	Loveless	Nominated	
Golden Eagle Awards	Best Cinematography	2014	Leviathan	Nominated	
Golden Eagle Awards	Best Cinematography	2011	Elena	Won	
Golden Eagle Awards	Best Cinematography	2010	Silent Souls	Nominated	
Golden Eagle Awards	Best Cinematography	2004	The Return	Won	
Russian Guild of Film Critics	Best Cinematographer	2017	Loveless	Won	
Russian Guild of Film Critics	Best Cinematographer	2014	Leviathan	Nominated	
Russian Guild of Film Critics	Best Cinematographer	2011	Elena	Nominated	
Russian Guild of Film Critics	Best Cinematographer	2010	Silent Souls	Nominated	
Russian Guild of Film Critics	Best Cinematographer	2007	The Banishment	Won	
Russian Guild of Film Critics	Best Cinematographer	2003	The Return	Won	
