= Hello! I'm a Producer of Woody Allen =

Hello! I'M a producer of woody allen
- Directed by: Nicola Deorsola, Andrea Tagliaferri
- Written by: Marina Orlova
- Produced by: Marina Orlova, Davide Tovi
- Starring: Marina Orlova; Pino Ammendola; Rodolfo Corsato
- Edited by: Paolo Damiano Dolce
- Music by: Marina Orlova
- Release date: May 2016
- Running time: 15 minutes
- Country: Italy
- Language: English

Hello! I'm a Producer of Woody Allen is a 2016 short film.

== Cast ==
- Marina Orlova - Christina
- Rodolfo Corsato - Rodolfo
- Pino Ammendola - Restaurant Manager
