= Marina Orlova (actress) =

Russian actress (born 1986)

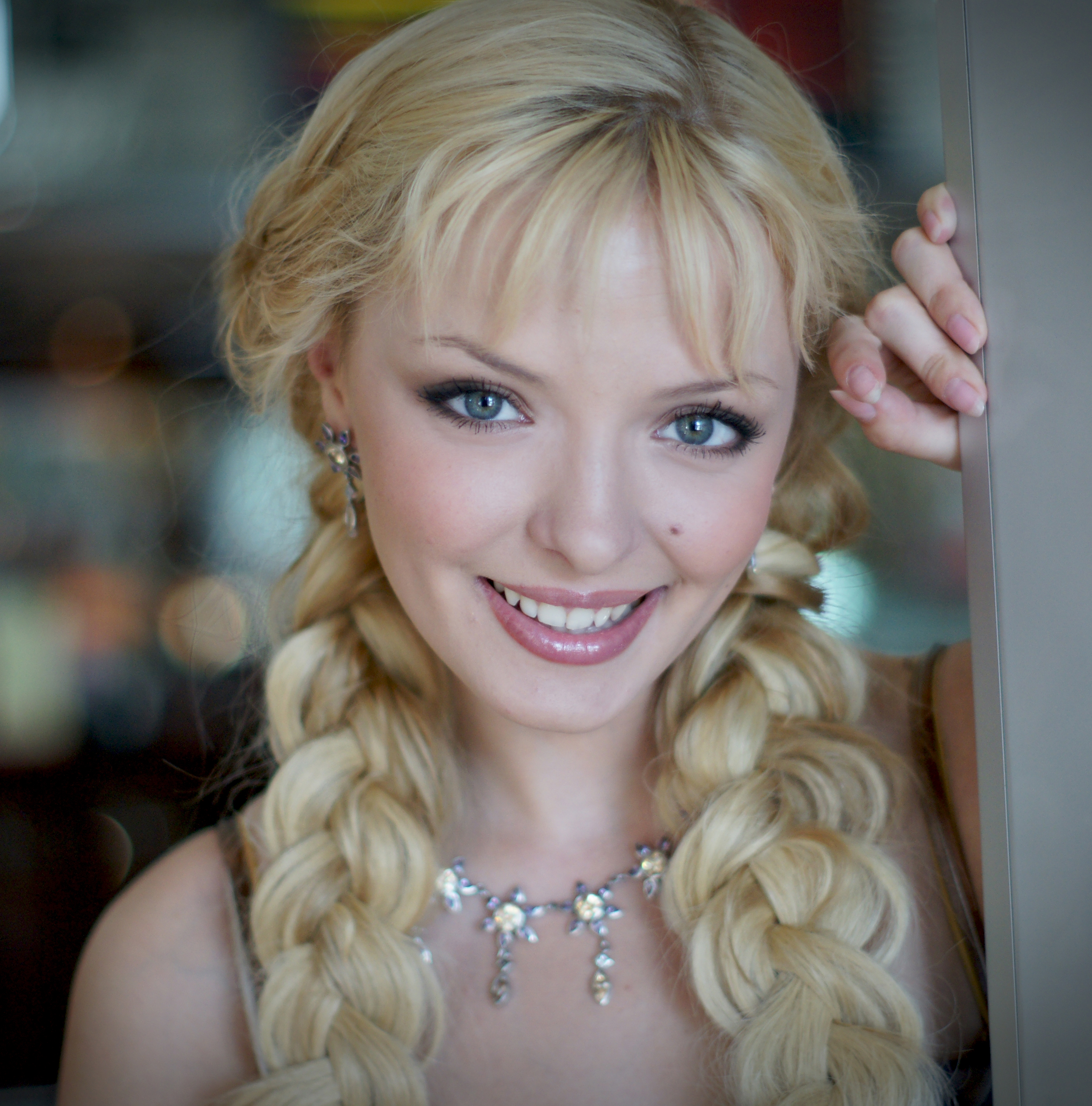
- Marina Orlova at the premiere of the film "37 affair" in the Pushkin theater.
- Born: Marina Viktorovna Orlova; 25 March 1986 (age 40); Pyatigorsk, Stavropol Krai, RSFSR, USSR
- Education: Boris Shchukin Theatre Institute
- Occupations: Actress, singer, composer, poet, presenter, radio host
- Years active: 1995–present
- Website: marinaorlova.film

Marina Orlova (Russian: Марина Викторовна Орлова; born 25 March 1986) is a Russian actress. To her credit, she has over 40 film and television roles. Orlova currently resides in Los Angeles.

== Biography ==
Her acting debut took place in 1995 at the Theater of Musical Comedy. While still a student of Boris Shchukin Theatre Institute, she was noticed by film director Tatyana Voronetskaya and was invited to star in the historical melodrama "The Model" which was selected in the competition program of the 18th Film Festival Kinotavr.

The following year, she was invited to play a starring role of Svetlana in the film "Blockhead" (Ohlamon) where she also sang. Orlova became popular in 2008 after the release of "Dear People" on the TV channel Russia 1, in which she starred as Olga. The show was extended for another 200 episodes.

Orlova was also noticed by Stanislav Govorukhin, who at that time was already in the process of filming the movie "The Passenger", but has added the role of Nina Markovna specifically for Orlova. The film won the main prize "Big Golden Bark" at the festival "Window to Europe" in Vyborg and other awards. Subsequently Orlova starred in several other films made by Govorukhin, including the detective film "Weekend".

Since 2009, Orlova has been active abroad as an actress. Chinese director Yu Xiao Gan had offered her a main role in the film "The Last Secrets of the Master" (猎人笔记之谜). One of the musical themes of the film was also written by Orlova. This role made her gain popularity in Asian countries.

In 2014, Orlova got the main role in "White Crows". She stars with Eric Roberts in the film about Frank Sinatra called "Frank and Ava". After this role, Orlova became a member of SAG-AFTRA. In Europe and Asia, she stars in films, plays at the theater, works as a model with Russian and Italian designers, as well as participating in concerts with her songs. She performed on the stage of Grand Kremlin Palace with the Caruso song accompanied by an orchestra of Naples and Italian singer Renzo Arbore, also she toured in Russia with her own songs.

During her film career, Orlova has played about 40 roles in films, has written approximately 80 songs, some of which can be heard in the movies where she starred, she is also a producer of two films, and screenwriter of one picture.

Italian short film in English, Hello! I'm the producer of Woody Allen is entirely produced by Orlova, in which she worked as a screenwriter, producer, composer and actress. The film was selected for the competition program of Moscow International Film Festival. The film was recognized as the best short Italian film and won the Grand Prix, Leonardo da Vinci Gold Horse, at the International Film Festival in Milan.

In addition to film and music works, Orlova is known as a TV and radio host of several programs.

She was appointed a Goodwill Ambassador for the Italian charity organization Maria Diomira, with the support of the Vatican, in a program to help children in Kenya and the construction of the school of arts.

== Filmography ==
- 2020 Frank and Ava as Lubov
- 2020 Baby Doll as Natasha
- 2019 Once upon a time in America, or a purely Russian fairy tale (TV film) as Valkiriya
- 2018 Headgame as Mariel
- 2016 Hello! I'm a Producer of Woody Allen as Christina
- 2014 The Treehouse
- 2014 White Crows
- 2013 Weekend as singer Mary
- 2013 Not So Young
- 2012 Undercover (TV Series) as Barbie
- 2011 Always Say Always 7 (TV Series) as Liza
- 2011 The Golds. Barvikha 2 (TV Series) as Tatiana Lipkina
- 2010 Interns (Episode 6)
- 2010 Margosha (TV Series) as Svetlana, a three-day temporary secretary in the editorial "MF" (Season 2), with 219 Series – assistant in the department of "Fashion" (Season 3)
- 2010 The last secret of the Master (TV Series) as Elena
- 2009 Kremlin students (TV Series) as Nika Samokhina
- 2009 Female winter| as Olya
- 2009 Barvikha (TV Series) as Tatiana (Tanya) Lipkina
- 2008 Hipsters as Komsomolka (uncredited)
- 2008 Urgent Room 2 as Tatiana
- 2008 Relatives (TV Series Ukraine) as Olga Kuznetsova
- 2008 Cursed Paradise 2 (TV Series) as Roza
- 2008 Passenger as Nina Markovna
- 2008 Visyak (TV Series) as Olya
- 2007 The Matchmaker (TV Series) as Nastya
- 2007 All the boys are called Kostya
- 2007 Ohlamon as Sveta
- 2007 The Art Model (film) as Anna
- 2007 Gromovy, House of Hope (TV Series) as Larissa's translator
- 2004 Samara-gorodok (TV Mini-Series) as student
