= Anton Shagin =

Russian actor

- Антон Шагин
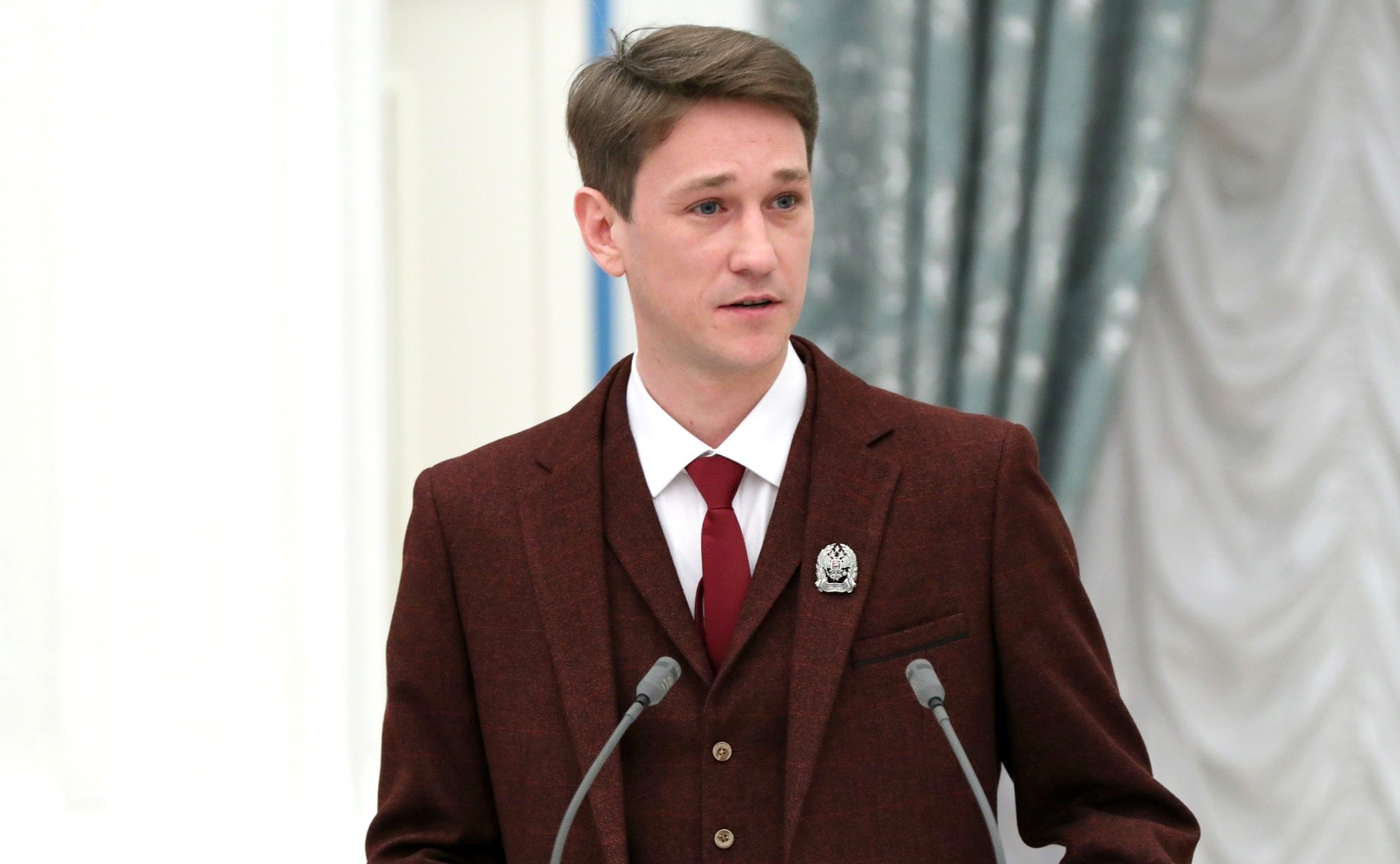
- Anton Shagin, Award of the President, 2017
- Born: Anton Aleksandrovich Gorshkov; 2 April 1984 (age 42); Kimry, Kalinin Oblast, RSFSR, USSR
- Occupation: Actor
- Years active: 2007–present
- Awards: (2016)
- Website: www.antonshagin.ru

Anton Aleksandrovich Shagin (Russian: Анто́н Алекса́ндрович Ша́гин, born 2 April 1984) is a Russian actor of theater, most famous for his role as Mels in Hipsters.

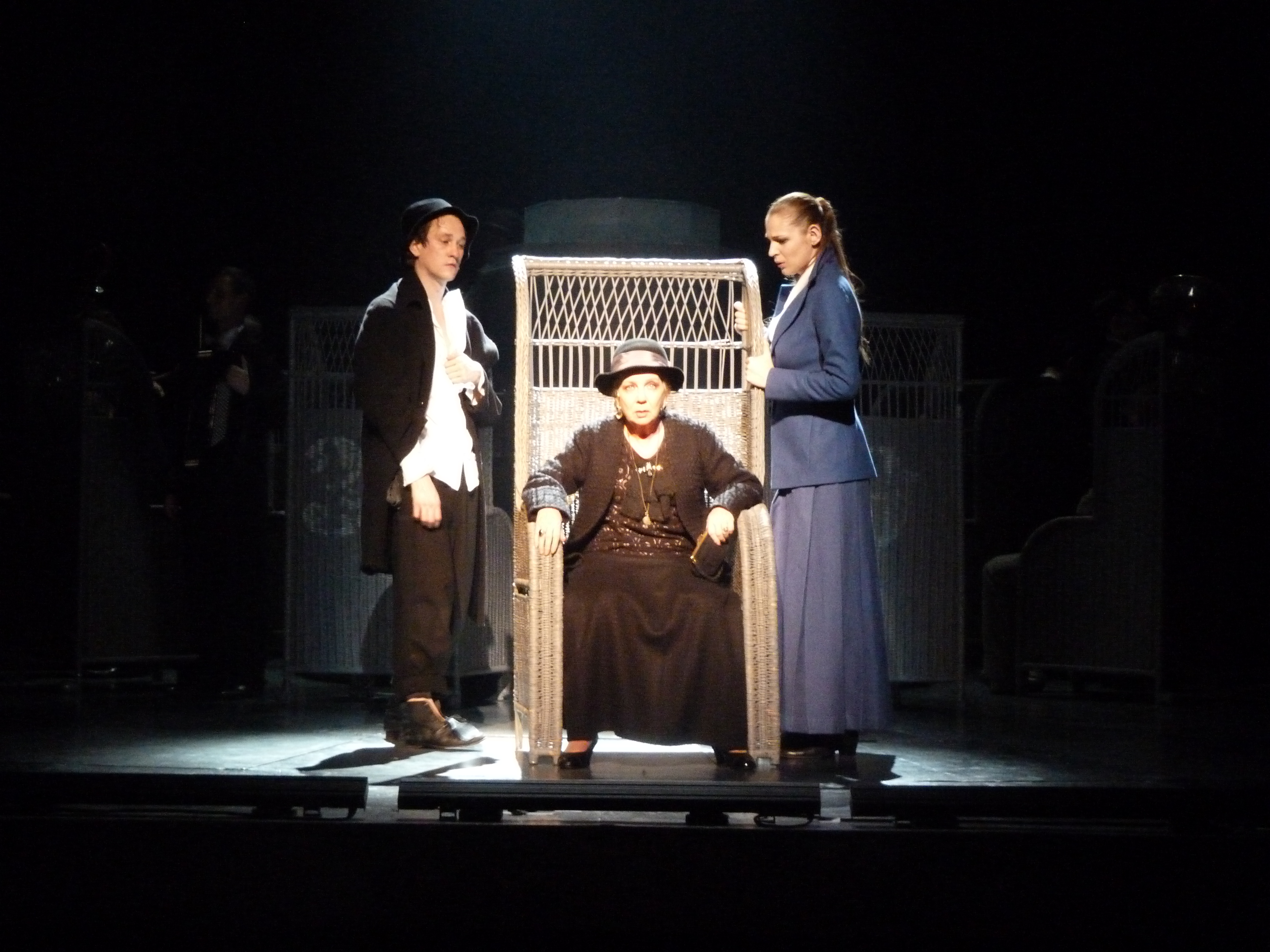
Anton Shagin and Era Ziganshina- MITEM 2014

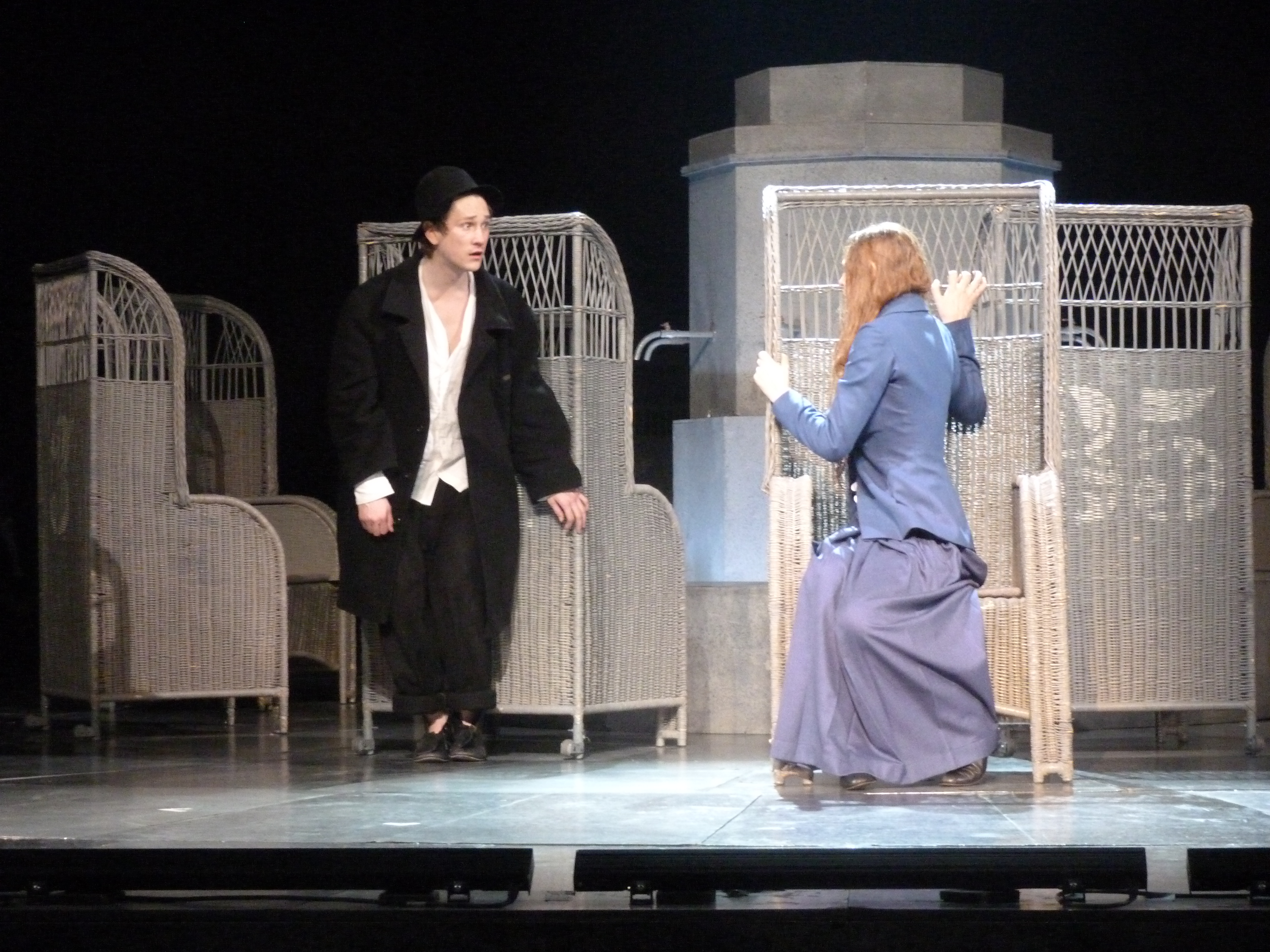
Anton Shagin and Mariya Lugovaya

== Biography ==
Anton Gorshkov (Shagin) was born in Kimry, Kalinin Oblast, Russian SFSR, Soviet Union. He spent his childhood in Karachev, Bryansk Oblast.

Before attending school, he bore the name of Anton Gorshkov (Shagin - the surname of his stepfather). When Anton was 14 years old, his mother died. After 9th grade he went to study at a vocational school to be a locksmith. He participated in the initiative. After graduating from vocational school, he worked for one year, went to Moscow to enroll in the Moscow Art Theater School. He entered the first time.

In 2006, he graduated from the Moscow Art Theatre School (course of I. Zolotovitsky and S. Zemtsov).

Winner of the Theatre Award "Golden Leaf" in 2006 for Best Actor in the play Do not part with your beloved in the Moscow Art Theater School.

Since the 2022 Russian invasion of Ukraine, Anton has played an active role in promoting the Russian narrative of the Russo-Ukrainian War on state media. He has been featured in interviews on the Russia-1 program Life and Destiny, where he emotionally describes atrocities by the Ukrainian government he claims to have witnessed against ethnic Russians while traveling in Donbas.

== Personal life ==
He is married to classmate Veronika Isayeva. Their children are son Matvey (b. 2008) and daughter Polina (b. 2014).

== Roles in theater ==
Lenkom Theatre

- 2009 "The Cherry Orchard" by Anton Chekhov; director Mark Zakharov - Lopakhin
- 2011 "Peer Gynt" by Ibsen; director Mark Zakharov - Peer Gynt

Moscow Art Theatre Chekhov

- "Do not part with your beloved" Volodin - Mitya

Russian Academic Youth Theatre

- "The Red and the Black" by Stendhal; director Yuri Eremin - Male
- "The Coast of Utopia" T. Stoppard; director Alexander Borodin - Sleptsov

Other theaters

- "Valentine's Day". Director: Victor Ryzhakov - Valentin (TC Strastnoy)
- "July". Director: Victor Ryzhakov - the role of three sons of a maniac (Theater "Practice")
- "Love of the Stanislavsky system." Director: Mikheil Kazakov - Alex (youngest son) (PM Innovation)
- "Liturgy ZERO» Director: Valery Fokin - the role of Alexei Ivanovich (Alexandrinsky Theater in St. Petersburg)

== Filmography ==
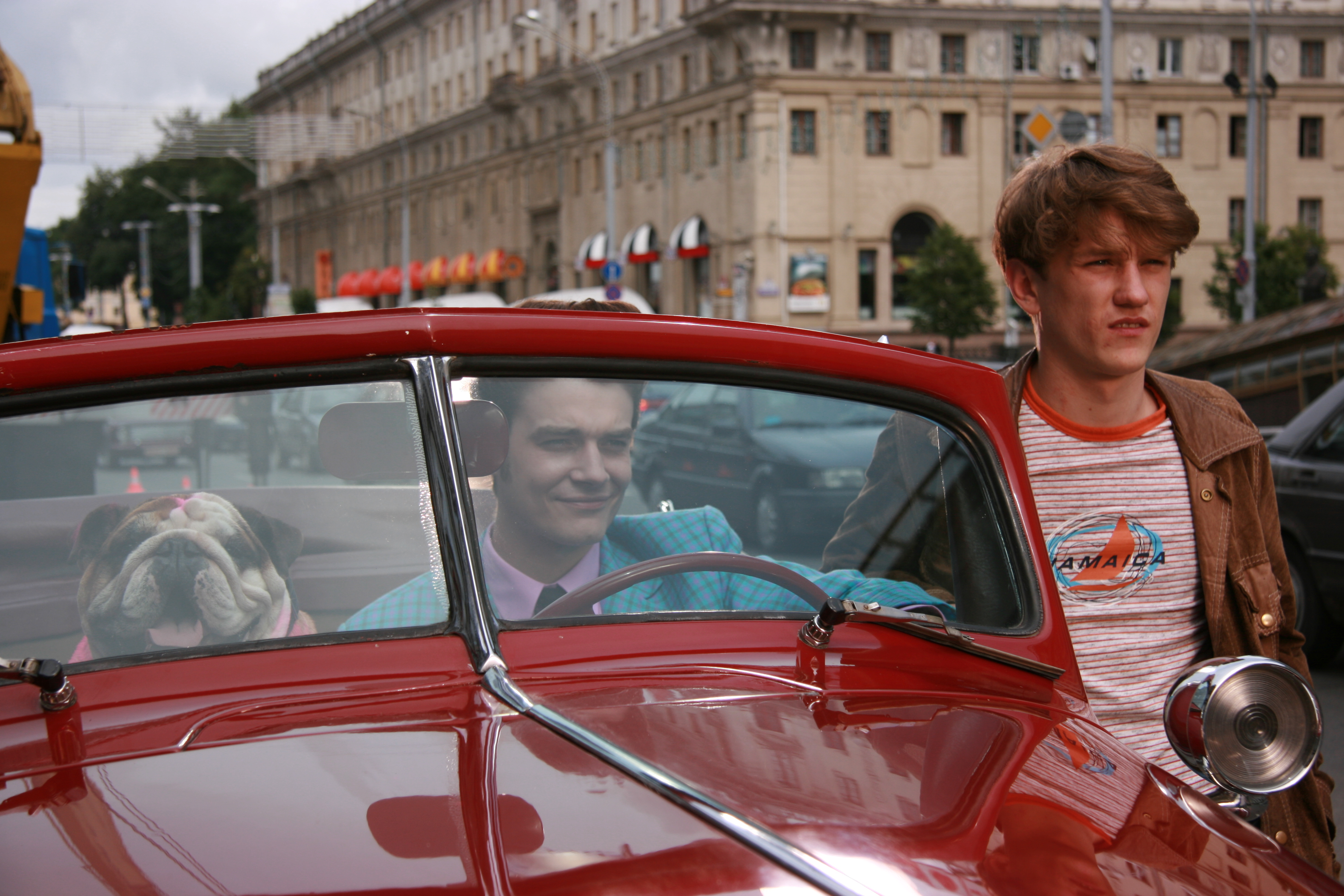
film Hipsters

=== Film ===
List of film credits
Year	Title	Role	Notes
2007	Vice	Krot	
2008	Hipsters	Mels	
2010	The Weather Station	Slava	
2010	Without Men		
2010	Touch	Gleb	(ru)
2010	Moscow fireworks	Semyon	
2011	Kiss Through a Wall	Kesha	
2011	Innocent Saturday	Valeriy Kabysh, Komsomol worker	(ru)
2011	loafers	Solovey	
2014	Sex, coffee, cigarettes		
2015	Security	Vitaliy	
2015	Anka with Moldavanka	Arkadiy Sotnikov	TV series
2016	Friday	Vitaliy Belov	
2016	Versus	Shark	
2017	The Road to Calvary	Alexey Bessonov	TV series
2018	Dovlatov	Anton Kuznetsov	
2019	Union of Salvation	Kondraty Ryleyev, poet, journalist	Films based on Union of Salvation
2021	The North Wind	Benedict	
2021	Upon the Magic Roads	Ivan the Fool	The tale is based on The Humpbacked Horse.
2022	Petrópolis	Vladimir Ognev	
