= Kiss Through a Wall =

- Poster
- Directed by: Vartan Akopyan
- Written by: Amet Magomedov
- Produced by: Gevorg Nersisyan; Armen Adilkhanyan
- Starring: Anton Shagin; Karina Andolenko; Pavel Volya; Aleksandr Adabashyan; Mikhail Tarabukin
- Cinematography: Vahagn Ter-Hakobyan
- Edited by: Matvey Yepanchintsev
- Music by: Arkady Ukupnik; Dmitry Noskov
- Production company: Paradise Production Center
- Distributed by: Paradise
- Release date: January 25, 2011
- Running time: 87 minutes
- Country: Russia
- Language: Russian
- Box office: $2 million

Kiss Through a Wall (Russian: Поцелуй сквозь стену, romanized: Potsuy skvoz stenu) is a 2011 sci-fi comedy-drama film directed by Vartan Akopyan, starring Anton Shagin and Karina Andolenko.

== Plot ==
Innoktentiy is a loser who lives in a rented apartment with a drug addict, Kondratiev. Kesha works for his uncle, the magician-charlatan. His uncle fires him, and the landlady wants to get rid of them, there is no money except the last twenty rubles. However, Kesha falls in love with the young and daring journalist Alisa. But he is just an information source for her and nothing more. When wandering aimlessly along the lanes of night Moscow, Kesha gets a gift - to pass through walls, from the vagabond, who begs for his last twenty rubles. Now he can take food without opening a refrigerator, get into the apartments of the most unexpected people, he instantly grows rich. But wealth can not give him Alisa. Kesha goes to the most inconceivable tricks, but all his adventures prove that no supernatural abilities in love can help.

In despair, he climbs onto the Ostankino tower and breaks off with her in front of Alice. She falls unconscious and gets to the hospital, and Kesha gets off with a slight fright. In the hospital, Kesha learns that his little friend Sasha, whom he often visited, is very sick. An operation for $150,000 is required. He brings money for the treatment of the girl, and then Alisa realizes that she loves him.

== Cast ==
- Anton Shagin as Kesha
- Karina Andolenko as Alisa Pavlovskaya, a journalist
- Pavel Volya as Rastaman Kondratiev
- Aleksandr Adabashyan as Yarilo Kartashov
- Mikhail Tarabukin as Vadik, Alisa's boyfriend
- Ivan Okhlobystin as a vagabond wizard
- Sergey Gazarov as Viktor Pilsudsky, editor-in-chief
- Svetlana Nemolyaeva as Alisa's grandmother
- Olga Tumaykina as Yadviga, landlady
- Tatiana Abramova as Rosa, secretary
- Soso Pavliashvili as cameo
- Mikhail Evlanov as episode
- Ametkhan Magomedov as episode
