= Maksim Matveyev =

Russian film and theater actor

- Максим Матвеев
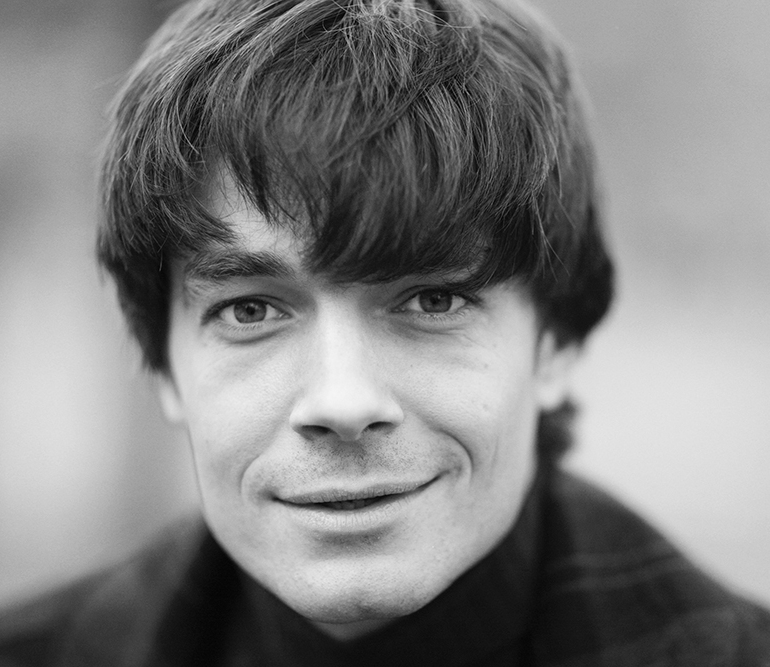
- Matveyev in 2014
- Born: Maksim Aleksandrovich Matveyev; 28 July 1982 (age 44); Svetly, Kaliningrad Oblast, Russian SFSR, Soviet Union
- Occupation: Actor
- Years active: 2002–present
- Spouse(s): Elizaveta Boyarskaya (2010–); Yana Sekste (2008–2009)
- Children: 2

Maksim Aleksandrovich Matveyev (Russian: Макси́м Алекса́ндрович Матве́ев; born 28 July 1982) is a Russian film and theater actor. He was conferred distinction as Honored Artist of the Russian Federation in 2018.

== Early life ==
Maksim Matveyev was born in Svetly, Kaliningrad Oblast, part of the then Russian SFSR in the Soviet Union. In 1999 Maksim graduated from high school No. 2 in Saratov with a silver medal. During school years, he thought of getting into a medical institute to become a surgeon, but later he changed his mind and decided to enter the Faculty of Law of the Volga Region Academy of Public Service. But an incident led him to the theater department. District ball of the medalists was led by Vladimir Smirnov, a student of Valentina Ermakova. This evening, a variety of games and competitions were held and Smirnov noticed Maksim, gave him Valentina's phone number and forcefully urged to try his luck in the theater department. Maksim attempted to pass entrance examinations in two universities at once: the Academy of Civil Service and in the theater department of the Saratov Conservatory. As a result, he was accepted to study at the theater, and immediately for the second term.

His first major role was Nijinsky in the graduation performance "Clown of God."

In 2002, Maksim Matveyev graduated from the theater department of the Saratov State Conservatory. Sobinov (V. Ermakova course). In 2006 - Moscow Art Theater School (course of Zolotovitsky and Zemtsov). At the end of the school-studio he was accepted into the troupe of Moscow Art Theatre, where he made his debut in the play "The Piemonte Beast", playing the role of a knight there Joffrey.

He has an extensive list of leading roles on the Moscow Art Theatre stage: "The Drunks" - Laurence; "The Last Sacrifice" - Dulchin; "The Karamazovs" - Perkhotin, Miusov, Expert, Professor, Pathologist; "An Ideal Husband. A Comedy" - father Artemiy. In the Moscow Theatre managed by Oleg Tabakov: "Wolves and Sheep" - Appolon Murzavetsky; "The Devil" - Yevgeny Ivanovich Irtenev.

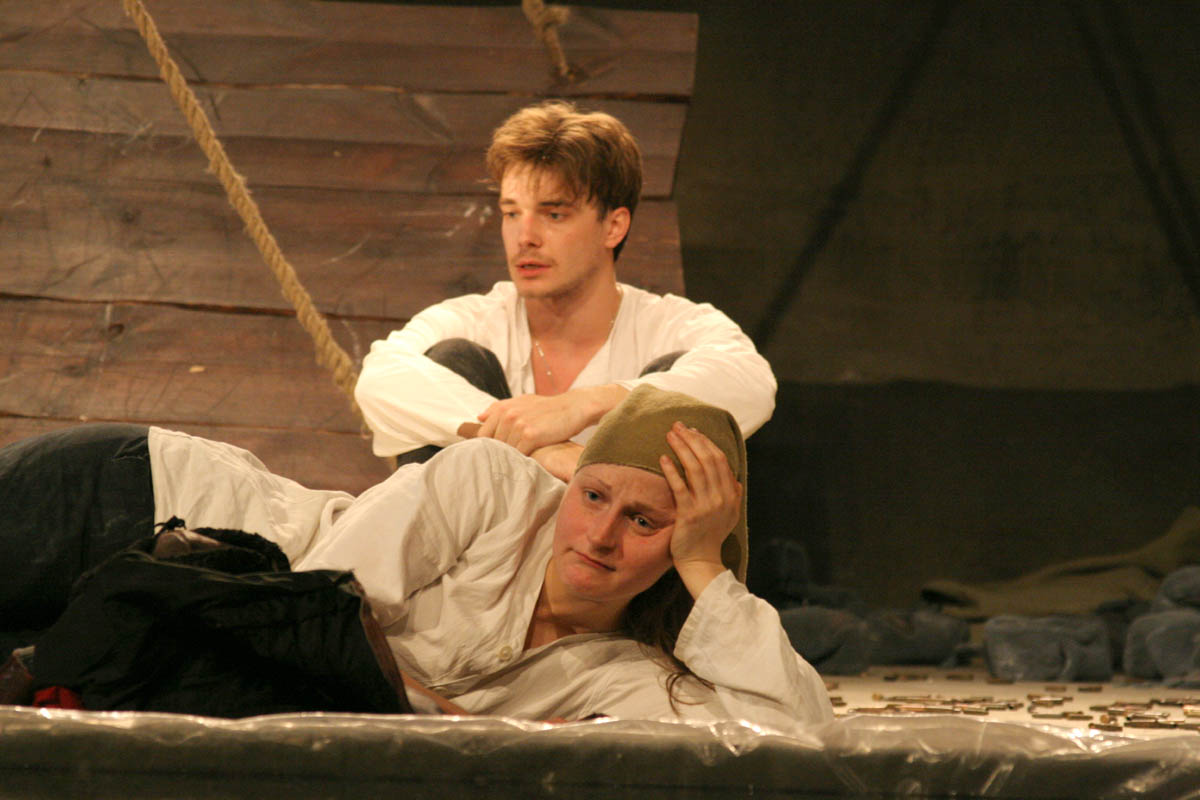
Yana Sekste and Maksim Matveyev in a scene from "The Forty-First".

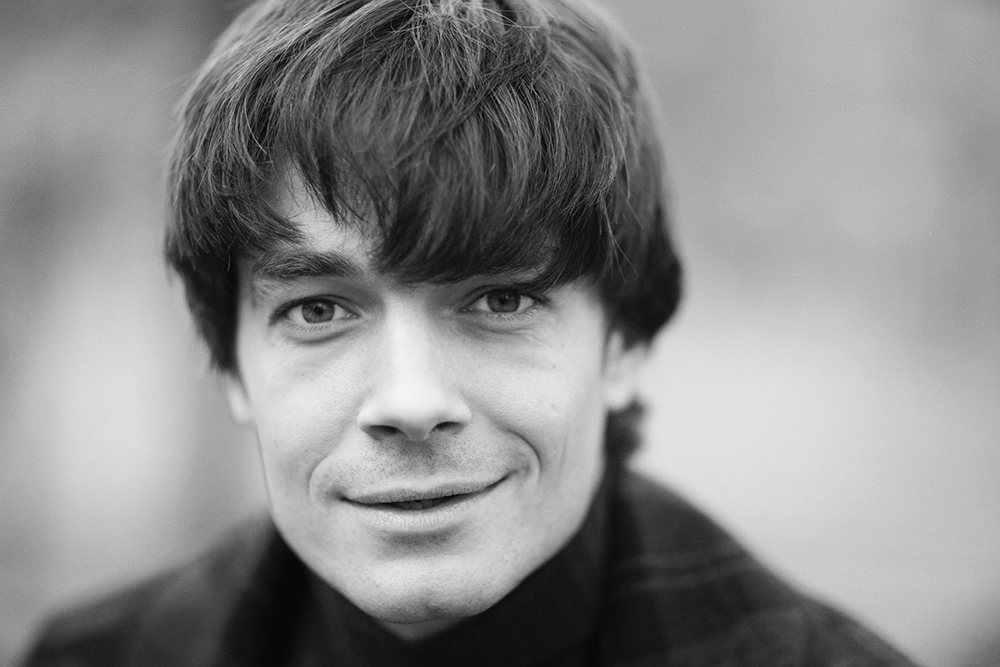
Maksim Matveyev actor

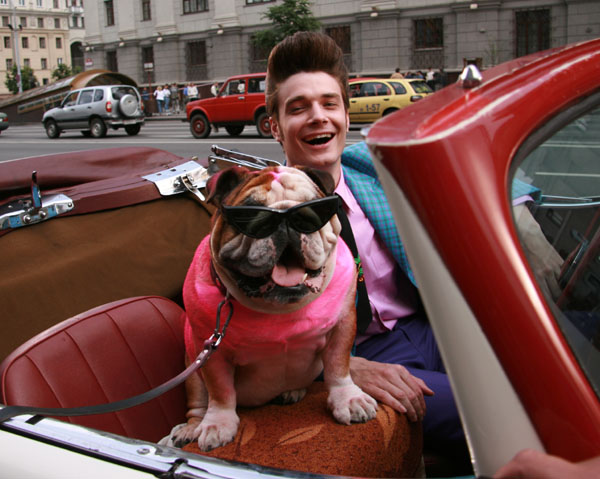
film "Hipsters" (2008).

== Personal life ==
In 2008, he married Yana Sekste, a Latvian and Russian actress (divorced).

In 2010, he married a highly popular Russian actress, Elizaveta Boyarskaya, on April 7, 2012, their son Andrei was born. On December 5, 2018, their son Gregory was born.

== Filmography ==
Year	Title	Role	Notes
2007	Vice	Denis Orlov	
2007	Thanks for the love!	Vanya	
2008	Hipsters	(Fred) Fedor Brusnitsyn	
2008	The tariff "New Year"	Andrei	
2009	Pelagia and the White Bulldog	Arkady Sergeevich Poggio	
2010	I will not say	Ivan	
2010	Tulskiy Tokarev	Artem Tokarev	TV series
2011	On hook!	Sergei Hlobyshevsky	
2011	Wedding Exchange	Sasha	
2010	Captains	Roma	TV
2011	Santa Claus always rings ... three times!	Artur	TV
2011	Fairytale.Is	Dad	
2011	Diamond Hunters	Leonid Bacher (Pretty boy)	TV series
2012	Yalta-45	John Wilby	Miniseries
2012	Combat Hospital	Vasily Bezhin	TV series
2012	August Eighth	commander of the reconnaissance Aleksyei "Lekha"	
2012	Mosgaz	Vlad Vikhrov	Miniseries
2012	Happy New Year, Mom!	Evgeniy	
2012	Zonnentau	Semen Nikolaevich Kharitonov	TV series
2013	Love for Love	Alexander Grigoriev	Miniseries
2013	Weekend	Igor Lebedev	
2014	Love Does Not Love	Aleksei	
2014	Fort Ross: In search of adventure	Dmitry	
2014	The Devils	Nikolai Stavrogin	Miniseries
2016	Indemnities	Major-General Anatoly Pepeliaev	
2016	Player	Nikita Pirogov	TV series
2016	Mata Hari	Vladimir Maslov	TV series
2016	The Real Screenplay		Short
2016	Investigator Tikhonov	Gregory Belash	TV series
2016	The telki		
2017	About Love. For Adults Only	Nikita Orlov	
2017	Anna Karenina	Vronsky	TV series
2017	Anna Karenina: Vronsky’s Story	Vronsky	Motion Picture
2017	Trotsky	Frank Jackson (Ramon Mercader)	TV series
2019	Union of Salvation	Prince Sergei Trubetskoy, polkovnik of the guard, duty officer of the General Staff	Motion Picture
2020	Trigger	Artyom	TV series
2020	Sherlock in Russia	Sherlock Holmes	TV series
2026	Chuzhie dengi	Aleksey Voronov and Yura Afanasyev	TV series

== Awards and nominations (cinema) ==
Year	Award	Category	Nominated work	Result	Ref.
2008	MTV Russia Movie Awards	Breakthrough of the Year	Vice	Nominated	
2009	Russian National Movie Awards	Best Russian Actor	Hipsters	Nominated	
2011	IX Spirit of Fire International Film Festival	Best Ensemble (with Elizaveta Boyarskaya)	I Will Not Say	Won	
2014	The Hollywood Reporter Russia Awards	Male Movie Star of the Year	The Devils	Won	
2014	Russian National Movie Awards	Best Russian Actor of the Decade	—N/a	Nominated	
2015	Golden Eagle Award	Best Leading Actor	Weekend	Nominated	
2018	Golden Eagle Award	Best Actor in a Streaming Series	Anna Karenina: Vronsky's Story	Nominated	
2021	Golden Eagle Award	Best Leading Actor	Union of Salvation	Nominated	
2021	Golden Eagle Award	Best Actor in a Streaming Series	Trigger	Won	
2021	APKIT Awards	Best Actor in a TV Movie/Series	Trigger	Nominated	
2023	TEFI	Best Actor of TV Movie/Series	Trigger 2	Won	
