= Russian Translation =

Russian TV miniseries

- Also known as: Русский перевод
- Genre: political detective
- Based on: The Journalist (1996) by Andrej Konstantinov
- Written by: Eduard Volodarsky
- Screenplay by: Eduard Volodarsky
- Directed by: Alexander Chernyaev
- Starring: Nikita Zverev; Sergey Veksler; Sergey Selin; Alyona Yakovleva; Ramil Sabitov
- Composer: Igor Kornelyuk
- Country of origin: Russia
- Original languages: Russian; English; Arabic; Arabic dialects Hebrew
- No. of episodes: 8 series of 53 minutes each

Production
- Executive producers: Alexander Chernjaev; Dmitrij Gluschenko consultants: Vladimir Agafonov; Vladimir Fisunov
- Camera setup: Dajan Gajtkulov
- Running time: 408 min (8 episodes)

Original release
- Network: NTV-Kino for 1TV First channell
- Release: 11 September – 20 September 2007

Russian Translation (Russian: Русский перевод) is a 2007 Russian TV miniseries, based on the novel The Journalist by Andrey Konstantinov (1996).

The plot is set in the 1980s and follows Soviet military advisors and translators working in Arab countries, specifically in Yemen and Libya.

== Plot summary ==
The film story begins in the second half of 1984 the final months of Konstantin Chernenko era - ending in the first part of 1991 - a few months before the anti-Gorbachev's GKChP coup d'état attempt.

A hero Andrey Obnorsky (Nikita Zverev), a young student-orientalist from Leningrad - along the line of the Soviet Defense Ministry falls on his Arabic language practice into Marxist South Yemen.

When he comes by Aeroflot Tu-154M plane in PDRY's capital Aden he feels shocked! He has to understand a local dialectal speech - but they learned only the language of the Quran! He has to survive in this Arabian heat but they say Soviet predecessors - Englishmen - freed their servicemen, who served in Aden, from the penal responsibility for several years because of it.

Above Obnorsky has had to be a translator and interpreter in a newly forming elite 7th Airborne brigade of the General Staff of the People's Democratic Republic of Yemen, to take part in the near-boundary clashes of southerners with the northerners (the way to the unification of Yemen was entirely complex) as well as between government forces and murtazaks, southern local armed opposition men, coming from abroad.

Without his own will, Obnorsky occurs in the middle of a dangerous plot with the participation of the KGB, GRU men, and Palestinians, who had to receive a large party of weapons from the USSR, and the quarreling fractions in the ruling Yemeni Socialist Party authorities, President Ali Nasser Muhammad supporters and opposition, before and during bloody combat on the streets of Aden.

Happy Arabia the hero of film will meet his love and then will find two loyal friends. Arabic language student-interpreter Ilya Novoselov (Andrey Frolov), a cadet from the legendary Moscow VIIJa (the Military Institute - formerly the Military Institute of Foreign Languages of the Red Army), introduce him into the military interpreters. The Palestinian instructor officer called Sindibad (Ramil Sabitov), the master of a hand-to-hand fighting, will teach him to fight.

After being graduated from the Leningrad State University and urgent service of two years in one of the Soviet flying military schools - (already as the interpreter/translator-officer) Obnorsky goes again to the Arab World, now to Libya. This mission from The Ten (the 10th Main Direction of the General Staff of the Ministry of Defence of the USSR) also is not calm.

Finally, his friend Ilya Novoselov commits suicide leaving a very strange letter, and Obnorsky begins his own dangerous investigation which leads him to his old enemy from Adeni times his elder colleague and GRU man Kukarintsev (Pavel Novikov).

== Historical accuracy ==
Despite his experience as a military interpreter/translator with the Soviet military advisors in South Yemen and Libya the author of the novel, Andrey Konstantinov, stresses in the beginning of his book that no real historical persons, places and events are depicted, but all the divergences from full historical accuracy are "conforming to the laws of nature". He considers it difficult to combine the work of a routine lowest ranking serviceman-interpreter with life with a war and detective plot full of danger and adventure which would appeal to the Russian public in the mid-1990s. He says that the novel looked 'more alive' when he hyperbolised the facts, changed some geography and peoples' names and, generated new unknown "historical facts". Despite the author admitting to the historical inaccuracies, The novel continues to be popular amongst the young readers in Russia.

The book format helps a lot in this, switching on every reader's individual fantasy. However, the film or series format demanded a return to some kind of remaking of true historical realities and to restore some general distinctive features of that time: local environmental and cultural, political, ideological, military, social, native, conversational and many other details, which are easy to remember and recognise by those who took part in that or similar events.

== Music ==
The music for the film was composed by Igor Kornelyuk. The song Pismo (The Letter) is the first rap experience of this known composer from Saint Petersburg. Words: Regina Lisits. Performance: Pavel Ostroumov and Nina Vedenina.

== Cast ==
=== Russia ===
- Nikita Zverev as Andrey Obnorsky
- Andrey Frolov as Ilya Novoselov
- Ramil Sabitov as Sindibad, Palestinian officer
- Sergey Selin as major Doroshenko
- Sergey Veksler as colonel Gromov
- Pavel Novikov as Kukarintsev, then Djomin
- Aleksandr Tyutin as KGB-man Tsarkov
- Aleksandr Pashutin as general Sorokin
- Aleksandr Tsurkan as head of translators in Aden Pakhomenko
- Aleksandr Jakovlev as colonel Gritsaljuk
- Alyona Yakovleva as a wife of an artillery advisor
- Tatiana Abramova as secretary Marina
- Viktor Alfyorov as translator Nazrullo Tashkorov
- Mikhail Politseymako as translator Fikret Gusejnov
- Vladimir Epifantsev as translator Vikhrenko
- Aleksandr Makagon as translator Vyrodin
- Sergey Shekhovtsev as colonel Karpukhin
- Anton Eldarov as translator Tsyganov
- Ivan Mokhovikov as translator Gridich
- Konstantin Karasik as driver Gena
- Valery Zhakov as Victor Obnorsky, Andrey's father
- Kirill Pletnyov as investigator Kondrashov
- Maria Antipp as Irina
- Anton Kukushkin as translator Kolokol'chikov
- Denis Yasik as translator Bubentsov
- Roman Nesterenko as military school lecturer
- Aleksandr Ablyazov as colonel Sectris
- Vladimir Goryushin as Strumsky
- Aleksey Oshurkov as our man in Benghazi
- Pavel Smetankin as episode

=== Azerbaijan ===
- Polad Fuad Agaragim Ogly as General Abdu Salih
- Fuad Osmanov as major Mansour
- Firdavsi Atakishijev as colonel Isa
