= Roman Vasyanov =

Russian cinematographer (born 1980)

- Роман Васьянов
- Born: October 24, 1980 (age 45); Moscow, Russian SFSR, Soviet Union
- Years active: 2002–present

Roman Sergeyevich Vasyanov, ASC, RGC (Russian: Роман Сергеевич Васьянов; born October 24, 1980) is a Russian cinematographer.

== Life and career ==
Vasyanov was born in Moscow. As a child, he was engaged in photography with his father, who worked at the ZIL automobile plant. Made photos and videos as a freelancer for magazines and newspapers. Later, thanks to his father's friend M. D. Koroptsov, he got acquainted with the profession of a cameraman.

In 1998, he entered VGIK (workshop of V. I. Yusov). At the XXIV International Film Festival VGIK, he received the prize for the best camera work in the film "Hide and Seek". While studying at VGIK, he worked as an assistant cameraman to Yu.

Vasyanov is a member of Russian Guild of Cinematographers, and American Society of Cinematographers since 2022.

== Filmography ==
Cinematographer

Year	Title	Director
2005	Graveyard Shift	Valeri Rozhnov
2006	Piranha	Andrey Kavun
2007	Vice	Valery Todorovsky
2008	Stilyagi	Valery Todorovsky
2010	Yavlenie prirody	Aleksandr Lungin; Sergey Osipyan
2012	End of Watch	David Ayer
2012	The Motel Life	Alan Polsky; Gabe Polsky
2013	The East	Zal Batmanglij
2013	Charlie Countryman	Fredrik Bond
2014	Fury	David Ayer
2016	Suicide Squad	David Ayer
2017	The Wall	Doug Liman
2017	Thank You for Your Service	Jason Hall
2017	Bright	David Ayer
2019	Triple Frontier	J. C. Chandor
2019	Odessa	Valery Todorovsky
2024	Limonov: The Ballad	Kirill Serebrennikov
2025	In the Hand of Dante	Julian Schnabel
2026	Après	Kirill Serebrennikov

Director/writer

- Hostel (2021)

== Awards and nominatons ==
Year	Award	Category	Title	Result	Ref.
2008	Golden Eagle Awards	Best Cinematography	Stilyagi	Nominated	
2010	Kinotavr	Best Cinematography	Act of Nature	Won	
2012	Independent Spirit Awards	Best Cinematography	End of Watch	Nominated	
