= Viktor Alfyorov =

Russian theatre director

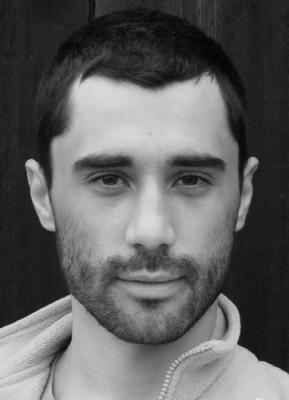
- Viktor Alfyorov
- Born: Viktor Vladimirovich Alfyorov; 20 September 1977 (age 49); Orongoy, Ivolginsky District, Republic of Buryatia, USSR (now Buryatia, Russia)
- Occupations: Director, actor

Viktor Vladimirovich Alfyorov (Russian: Ви́ктор Влади́мирович Алфёров, 20 September 1977) is a Russian theatrical director and actor.

== Biography ==
Viktor Alfyorov was born in Orongoy, Buryatia. In 1999 he graduated from the East Siberian State Academy of Culture and Arts (Ulan-Ude, Republic of Buryatia) in "The artistic director of the theater group". The graduation performance "Gypsies" (A. Pushkin) in French went on the stage of the Youth Theatre in Ulan-Ude. Production took 1st place in the Theatre Festival in the Republic of Buryatia.

In the same year he moved to Moscow and entered the Russian University of Theatre Arts (GITIS) on directing department in workshop of Mark Zakharov. In 2004 he successfully graduated from the training with honors, produces diploma performance "Bambukopoval" at Teatr.doc. The play was presented at Sib-ALTERA 2003 festivals in Novosibirsk and "The May reading - 2003" in Yekaterinburg, as well as on tour in Saint Petersburg, Omsk and Tolyatti.

== Theatrical productions ==
- Bambukopoval (Бамбукоповал) / Bambukopoval (2003)
- Dva Muzha Donny Flor (Два мужа донны Флор) / The Two Donna Flor's Husbands (2006)
- Marmelad (Мармелад) / The Marmalade (2007)
- Podobiya (Подобия) / Resemblance by Sasha Dugdale (2009)
- Zhizn' Udalas (Жизнь удалась) / Beautiful Life (2009)

== Acting ==
- 2002 3 Bogatyrya (TV series) / Три богатыря (сериал)
- 2005 My big Armenian wedding (mini-series) / Моя большая армянская свадьба (мини-сериал)
- 2006 Ticket to the Harem (TV series) / Билет в гарем (сериал)
- 2006 Russian Translation (TV series) / Русский перевод (телесериал)
- 2007 Kremen / Кремень
- 2008 A cruel business (TV series) / Жестокий бизнес (сериал)
