= Stilyagi (film) =

- Official film poster
- Directed by: Valery Todorovsky
- Written by: Yuriy Korotkov; Valeriy Todorovskiy
- Produced by: Vadim Goryainov; Leonid Lebedev; Valeriy Todorovskiy; Leonid Yarmolnik
- Starring: Anton Shagin; Oksana Akinshina; Maksim Matveyev; Evgeniya Khirivskaya; Ekaterina Vilkova; Igor Voynarovskiy; Konstantin Balakirev; Sergei Garmash
- Cinematography: Roman Vasyanov
- Edited by: Aleksey Bobrov
- Music by: Konstantin Meladze
- Production companies: Russia-1; Krasnaya Strela; Ministry of Culture; Planeta Inform
- Distributed by: Central Partnership
- Release date: 19 December 2008
- Running time: 120 minutes 136 min (full DVD)
- Country: Russia
- Languages: Russian; English subtitles
- Budget: $15 million
- Box office: $17 million (₽490 million)

Stilyagi (Russian: Стиляги, also known as Hipsters in the English release) is a 2008 Russian romantic jukebox musical film directed by Valery Todorovsky and starring Anton Shagin and Oksana Akinshina. Set in mid-1950s Moscow, the film depicts the Soviet stilyagi subculture, along with their struggle for self-expression within the prevailing reality of the Soviet repression.

Stilyagi has been featured at the Toronto International Film Festival, Nashville Film Festival, and the Cleveland International Film Festival, where it has been an audience favorite. It won the Audience Choice Award at the Anchorage International Film Festival in 2009 and several Golden Eagle Awards and Nika Awards, including Best Film in both. In Russia, it has become a cult film, as most of its score consists of covers of 1980s and 1990s Russian rock music from bands such as Bravo, Nautilus Pompilius, Nol and the Red Elvises. It received generally positive reviews from critics.

== Synopsis ==
In 1955, a group of young Muscovite Komsomol (communist youth) students led by Katya intercepts illegal stilyagi gatherings in Gorky Park. Perceived as "enemies of society", the stilyagi are forced to flee, with many of them getting caught and their clothing, ties or hair cut by the Komsomol for demonstrative purposes. Mels, a twenty-year-old paragon athletic student and member of the Komsomol, is ordered by Katya to chase one of the escapists, another young girl. However, the girl soon tricks him into believing that she broke her ankle, and then abruptly pushes Mels into a pond, at the same time inviting him to "come spend some time with Polly (Russian: Польза, wordplay on "benefit") on the Broadway".

The next day, Mels visits Gorky street and runs into the same group of stilyagi, with Polly among them. Before being aggressively seized by Dryn, another member, he has a short talk with Polly during which she gives him a kiss on the cheek, all while asking Mels if he has gotten sick. Fred, the leader of the gang, then appears, calling Mels an "innocent little schlub", and all the stilyagi leave the scene in Fred's car. Determined to being in love with Polly, Mels decides to change himself for someone she would appreciate: a stilyaga [singular of stilyagi].

Upon visiting local cloth retailers, Mels finds out that all the clothes sold there are alike, with no stark differences. He then gets called into an alley by an imported goods dealer, who sends Mels to a former textile factory operator, now retired and making on demand clothes for "different" people (clandestinely). Soon, Mels gets his new outfit prepared, turns a pair of regular shoes into high-platforms at his father's workplace factory, creates a compound to make his hair stay up, etc. When he comes out of his room dressed like a stilyaga, his father, whom he lives with, joyfully approves of the change as a phase of self-expression. However, Mels' younger brother, as well as all of the neighbours inside their communal apartment, give him the cold shoulder and remain speechless. Mels gets people shoving him and throwing things at him on the street, but continues on to find another member of the stilyagi, Jewish medical student Bob.

Mels intercepts Bob near his house and starts questioning him about learning to dance like them, with Bob mainly reluctant to respond by distrust (believing it to be a trap). Mels insists and finally the two visit Bob's apartment, where they have fun at dancing the boogie to bootlegged songs. Their party crashes when Bob's parents get home and Mels is obliged to leave. Now having a reliable connection to the gang, Mels finds Bob and the rest of stilyagi near a local theater, trying to get in. First hesitant, Polly and the others finally accept Mels amongst them, just as Fred arrives and provides everyone VIP entry. Mels assists a show of rock-n-roll songs, one of them performed by Fred, and has fun dancing with the others. On their way back, the stilyagi promptly meet with the komsomol and as two gangs clash, Katerina sees Mels amongst her enemies. Still confused by his actions, she then watches Polly take Mel's hand on purpose, and ends up publicly scolding him.

At Fred's party, Mels sees that Polly still remains mainly indifferent to him. He asks Fred for help, but ends up getting bad advice, much to the amusement of the rest of the gang. As he remains alone with her in a room, she tricks him again by excusing her to go to the bathroom, with the gang then busting him naked as he thought that the two would have sex. Despite the embarrassment, Mels' determination to change into a better man for Polly is not extinguished, and he gets Fred's appreciation for this. Later Fred suggests that Mels learns to perform in order to impress girls, as he himself does. The remark leaves Mels determined to find a saxophone and learn to play it.

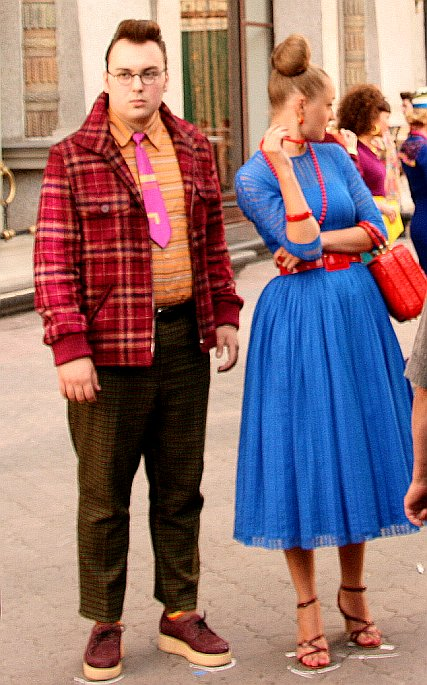
Actors depicting Bob and Betsy stand on their marks during filming of a scene

Several days later Mels meets the clothes dealer again and insists on obtaining a saxophone. The dealer leads him to an upbeat traveling jazzman whose career was broken by the Stalinist regime after he chose the "wrong" instrument. The musician proposes to do a favor of selling Mels his own saxophone, if Mels learns how to play it first. Mels then spends several nights listening to pirate radio from New York City trying to improvise the sound on the saxophone, but ends up faking it multiple times, until he is visited by the spirit of Charlie Parker who seemingly teaches him to play properly. This soon has Mels performing for his friends in a theater, of which he is nervous at first, yet he finally finds the vibe to much applause from the gang. At the end, Polly comes and gives Mels her first sincere kiss.

Soon after, Fred reveals to the gang that his father, a major diplomatic figure, has arranged a diplomatic post for him in the United States, and he now must leave the country, albeit provided that he marries a Soviet woman from an "approved" family, first, abandoning his lower-class, unconnected girlfriend, Betsy. Since Fred has the most authority in terms of leader, he grants future leadership to Mels, creating a situation of disdain in other members and eventually arising tensions. Katya, somewhat aware of these events, decides to try to lure Mels away from Polly by dressing better than her. As the two meet, she soon feels that Mels doesn't fall for her, and as she corners him, he rejects her, explaining that she has not changed at all. Furious, Katya slaps him and runs away. The next day, Mels comes to class realizing that a meeting is being organized by Katya with the purpose of excluding him from the Komsomol for being an antipatriotic "cosmopolitan". He silently gives away his badge, thus sealing his choice of remaining a stilyaga.

Although Mels gets great popular attention with his performances during the following months, he doesn't see that around him, the former stilyagi start pacing down their lives as, apparently, their lifestyle gets them nowhere. One night Polly meets drunk Mels at the bar and announces to him that she is pregnant with a child of an exchange African-American medical worker whom she met as intern and who was much older than her. Mels remains optimistic to raising the child anyway, but does not tell the others about its origins. As he settles down to become a father, the popularity of the stilyagi slowly turns into collective friend gatherings instead. The next year, Polly gives birth to a dark-skinned baby boy, John, but Mels' family and neighbors in the communal apartment end up accepting him as their own, despite the differences.

Months later, Fred returns from the United States to visit Mels. Having himself outgrown the movement by now, he witnesses a family living by Soviet standards with Mels still dressing as a stilyaga, and Polly raising a black-skinned toddler. Mels then tells Fred that most of the other members of their former gang moved on with their lives, with Bob eventually arrested and sent off to Siberia for buying illegal records from a smuggler, Dryn getting into the army, etc. They share a bottle of Jack Daniel's, after which Fred promptly reveals to Mels that there are no stilyagi in the United States, and that he has never met there anyone living the same lifestyle, as such flamboyant behavior and such disrespect for the laws would have had them locked up in a mental asylum in mere minutes. Appalled by this, Mels shouts at Fred, telling him to get lost, and rhetorically states to himself: "But we do exist..."

The film ends with Mels performing a song (together with the remaining stilyagi) that draws parallels between his movement and that of the late 1980s "nonconformist" Soviet countercultures (such as rockers and punks, among others), the moral of which is the importance of remembering to always stand for the values one believes in, which in turn allows for any of these cultures to be remembered over time.

== Cast ==
- Anton Shagin as Mels "Mel" Biryukov, former Gorky Park Komsomol unit member who gradually becomes a stilyaga
- Oksana Akinshina as Polina "Polly", nicknamed "Pol'za" ("Польза" which means "Benefit", etc.), MSU student who later falls in love with Mels
- Maksim Matveyev as Fyodor "Fred", son of an important Soviet politician
- Evgeniya Brik as Katya, Gorky Park Komsomol unit leader nicknamed "Commissar", who arranged raids on stilyagi
- Ekaterina Vilkova as Betsi
- Igor Voynarovskiy as Boris "Bob", a medical student
- Konstantin Balakirev as Andrei "Dryn", a worker
- Sergei Garmash as Mels' father
- Irina Rozanova as Polza's mother
- Oleg Yankovsky as Fred's father
- Leonid Yarmolnik as Bob's father
- Alexey Gorbunov as a drunkard jazz musician
- Marina Orlova as a Komsomol member

== Soundtrack ==
The soundtrack for the film includes hits from well-known Soviet rock bands such as Kino, Chaif, Bravo and Nautilus Pompilius. It features covers of several 1970s and 1980s songs with lyrics re-written for the film. Music was a large part of the stilyagi lifestyle so naturally the soundtrack of the movie played a huge role. Despite the movie taking place in 1950’s Moscow many of the songs used are covers of popular 1970 and 1980s songs.

Because there is not a current tradition of musical film in Russia, it proved impossible to find a composer able to score an entire film in the stilyagi musical style. Instead, Todorovskii had composer Konstantin Meladze rearrange rock classics of the seventies and eighties. The lyrics of these classic songs were adapted to fit the plot of the movie so that they would act to drive the narrative forward or comment on events. “Todorovskii justified this solution by pointing out that 1980s rockers demanded individual freedom and social change even more insistently than the non-political stiliagi [sic]. They were essentially the children of the stiliagi generation and similarly formed a counterculture.”

Soundtrack listing
Title	Music	Lyrics	Arranger	Performer	Notes
Emu ne nuzhna amerikanskaya zhena [He Doesn't Need an American Wife]	Kolibri	Konstantin Meladze	Konstantin Meladze	VIA Gra	Courtesy of VIA Entertainment
Vosmiklassnitsa	Viktor Tsoy	Victor Tsoy			
Chelovek i koshka	Fyodor Chistyakov	Fyodor Chistyakov			
Skovannyye odnoy tsepyu	Vyacheslav Butusov	Ilya Kormiltsev			
Ya to, chto nado	Valeriy Syutkin	Valeriy Syutkin			
Bugi-vugi kazhdyy den	Mikhail Naumenko	Mikhail Naumenko			
Zholtyye botinki	Evgeniy Khavtan	Zhanna Aguzarova			
Bud so mnoy vsegda ty ryadom	Evgeniy Khavtan	Zhanna Aguzarova			
Moya malenkaya beyba	Garik Sukachyov (as Igor Sukachyov); Sergey Galanin	Garik Sukachyov (as Igor Sukachyov); Dmitry Pevzner			
Pust vso budet tak, kak ty zakhochesh	Vladimir Shakhrin	Vladimir Shakhrin			
Shalyay-Valyay	Vladimir Shakhrin	Vladimir Shakhrin			
Staryy korabl	Andrey Makarevich	Andrey Makarevich			

== Historical context ==
Stilyagi, or in their direct translation, “style hunters”, was a youth counterculture that emerged around the start of the Cold War. The movie itself is set in 1955, two years after the death of Stalin. In a repressed Soviet Union, rebellious youth and Russians feening for jazz and rock found out-of-the-box, innovative ways to score records: bootleggers pressed forbidden music on x-ray films. The films were riddled with skulls and rib cages, the broken human form. They called it music on the ribs or bone music (roentgenizdat).

The records were thin and feeble, but all the same, bootleggers were willing to risk interrogation and imprisonment to feel the things that jazz makes us feel. Hospitals were overflowing with x-ray films and the Stilyagi helped themselves to this waste. The music, which bootleggers accessed through satellite countries (e.g. Hungary), was copied onto standard wax disk cutters and then pressed into x-rays. They then cut the x-rays into a rudimentary circle and would reportedly burn a hole through the center using a cigarette, a process depicted in the opening scene of the movie.The records were distributed in the black market at very cheap prices with one disc costing as low as one ruble.

Youth bought into the practice not only to make money but to disseminate Jazz (and other banned genres). Bootleggers would travel as far south as Sochi to find source material to access through satellites, climbing high points to install antennas to key into Swiss radio and even stations like BBC. Bootlegging became common practice to the point that bandits even threatened them for the bone records. Millions of records were sold until 1958 when Soviet officials deemed the practice illegal and the biggest bootlegging ring was busted the next year. In the early 60’s, the Komsomol (Leninist Young Communist League) pursued distributors and seized the bone records they found during their “anti-Western music patrols”.

== Costumes ==
Stilyagi attempted to emulate overseas fashion trends from roughly the late 1940s to the early 1960s. Many of the clothing items featured bright colors and exaggerated lines. The clothing style has been described as “a little bit rockabilly, a little bit preppy and a little bit English teddy boy”. The clothing choices were picked specifically to make the Stilyagi stick out from the Soviet masses who mostly wore dark, plain clothing that focused on function. “The men sported quiffs and pencil moustaches and wore thick rubber-soled shoes, tight trousers and bright, gaudy shirts and ties”. The women were equally as well styled with “fifties-American inspired dresses, pant suits and high hairstyles, often accompanied by bright red lips”. Statement accessories were also common among both genders.

The Stilyagi clothing would have preferably come from abroad, representing their fascination with western and especially American culture. However, Western items were difficult to come by, leading many Stilyagi to make their own clothes and accessories. Some also resorted to buying them illegally as is seen in the film.

Overall stilyagi clothing was used as a means to fight against the highly repressive society of Soviet Russia. In a society that strictly enforced uniformity and conformity, clothing acted as the perfect way for the Stilyagi to stand out. The costume designers worked hard to ensure that this crucial facet of the Stilyagi counterculture was accurately represented in the film.

== Choreography ==
The film's choreography includes the Western dances popular among the stilyagi including the tango, foxtrot, jitterbug and lindy hop, among others.

Neither the choreographers for the movie, Oleg Glushkov and Leonid Tintsunik, or the dancers had ever work in film before. The project faced hardship when half the dancers left the project after six months of rehearsals, and new performers had to be found.

== Reception and legacy ==
In Russia, the movie received mostly positive ratings and mixed reviews (many of the critics accused Hipsters of being anachronistic with regards to the historical events), as well as two awards: Nika Award (2008) and Golden Eagle (2009).

It spawned an interest in namesake subculture, with parts of it soon integrated in Russian youth fashion stream, as well as increased interest for musical instruments such as the saxophone and the trumpet among young Russian pop music producers. Starting in 2011, the film was also spun off into a musical concert which toured Europe and North America during the same year.

Yevgeni Grishkovetz, speaking positively of film, noted that one should not look for historical truths in it and compared its colorful style with American pin-up art.

Hipsters has an approval rating of 80% on review aggregator website Rotten Tomatoes, based on 25 reviews, and an average rating of 6.90/10. The website's critical consensus states,"Breezy, colorful, and suffused with joy, Hipsters offers audiences an engaging Cold War musical told from the other side of the Iron Curtain". It also has a score of 67 out of 100 on Metacritic, based on 11 critics, indicating "generally favorable reviews".
