= Silent Souls =

- Film poster
- Directed by: Aleksey Fedorchenko
- Written by: Denis Osokin
- Produced by: Igor Mishin; Maria Nazari
- Starring: Yuri Tsurilo; Igor Sergeyev; Yuliya Aug; Viktor Sukhorukov
- Cinematography: Mikhail Krichman
- Music by: Andrey Karasyov
- Release date: 2010
- Running time: 75 minutes
- Country: Russia
- Language: Russian

Silent Souls (Russian: Овся́нки, "The Buntings") is a 2010 Russian road drama film that was nominated for the Golden Lion at the 67th Venice Film Festival. It is based on a 2008 novella by Denis Osokin. The film was awarded the Golden Osella for best cinematography and a FIPRESCI award. It was considered a frontrunner for the Golden Lion, but did not win. However, it did win Best Screenplay (awarded to Denis Osokin) at the 2011 Asia Pacific Screen Awards. It received generally positive reviews from critics.

== Plot ==
Aist is a middle-aged bachelor who leads a lonely life in the northern town of Neya. Like many of his neighbours, he identifies as a Meryan and strives to keep alive the reconstructed traditions of that culture. He acquires two Bunting birds. One day his boss, Miron, informs Aist of the death of his wife Tanya and demands his help disposing of the body without an autopsy. The pair spend quite some time washing her body and putting coloured threads in her pubic hair. (In their culture, the same ritual is performed on brides-to-be). Taking the birds and Tanya's naked body with them, the two men travel to Gorbatov, the site of her honeymoon and the smallest town in Russia, in order to perform cremation rites on the banks of the Oka River. In a tradition of "smoking" or sexually recounting the dead, Miron boasts of his wife's strictly enforced submissiveness. Aist recalls that Tanya was unhappy. A policeman sees the dead body in their car but chalks it up to Meryan custom. On their way back to Neya, they get lost and are approached by two prostitutes, with whom they have sex. Thinking back on Tanya Miron laments that he should have "let her go" implying that her death was a murder to prevent her departure. Afterwards, while traversing the Kineshma Bridge, they are caused to crash into "the great Meryan river" (The Volga: there to drown) when the Buntings get loose in the car to peck at their eyes.

== Reception ==
Silent Souls received considerable praise from film critics. It has an approval rating of 96% on review aggregator website Rotten Tomatoes, based on 47 reviews, and an average rating of 7.70/10. It also has a score of 76 out of 100 on Metacritic, based on 15 critics, indicating "generally favorable reviews".

The official Rossiyskaya Gazeta compared the film to Tarkovsky's best work as a powerful evocation of pre-Christian roots of rural Russia. Andrei Plakhov praised the film as "a metaphor for the lost (and probably mythical) world that was crushed by the moloch of industrialisation".

Among American critics, Jim Hoberman wrote: "Dour yet affirmative, this laconic, deliberately paced, beautifully shot movie seeks the archaic in the ordinary". Jeannette Catsoulis of The New York Times commented: "Populated by memories and dappled with desire, “Silent Souls” is part folk tale, part lesson in letting go. In its quiet acceptance of the passing of time, this unusual film reminds us that to die is not always the same as to disappear". Roger Ebert expressed the opinion that the film "in only 75 perfect minutes achieves the profundity of an epic", also mentioning that "not often have I been more deeply touched". In contrast, Slant Magazine claims that "the film’s screenplay often shows more surface than depth" and that "the film wouldn’t reward multiple views save for the pleasure of looking at it."

== See also ==
- Meryan ethnofuturism
