= Vice (2007 film) =

- Russian: Тиски
- Directed by: Valery Todorovsky
- Written by: Oleg Malovichko; Valery Todorovsky
- Produced by: Vadim Goryainov; Leonid Lebedev; Valery Todorovsky; Leonid Yarmolnik
- Starring: Maksim Matveyev; Fedor Bondarchuk; Aleksey Serebryakov; Evgenia Brik; Ekaterina Vilkova
- Cinematography: Roman Vasyanov
- Music by: Aleksey Rybnikov
- Release date: 2007
- Country: Russia
- Language: Russian

Vice (Russian: Тиски) is a 2007 Russian crime action film directed by Valery Todorovsky. The film takes place in a southern city. The film tells about a successful DJ who dreams of becoming a professional musician. But life turns out differently...

== Plot ==
Young DJ Denis Orlov (played by Maksim Matveev), working in a nightclub in a provincial town, is struggling to pay his rent. His friends, Krot and Pulya, invite him to join in on a “job,” which initially seems like a simple car theft but quickly escalates into stealing drugs hidden in the car’s body. As they attempt to sell the drugs, they are ambushed and forced by the local drug lord Werner (Fyodor Bondarchuk) to start distributing drugs for him. Meanwhile, police major Dudaitis (Alexey Serebryakov) is determined to bring Werner down and tries, unsuccessfully, to recruit Denis to cooperate with law enforcement. Werner appoints Denis as the manager of his newly opened nightclub, and Denis’s relationship with his girlfriend, Masha, begins to deteriorate as he becomes increasingly secretive.

A friend of the group, Ptica, offers Denis the chance to make a profit by selling a large drug stash. After the deal, Denis realizes Dudaitis was present and continues to pressure him to cooperate, first by intimidating him and then by showing him the dark reality of drug addiction among children. Moved by this, Denis decides to quit the drug business, but Dudaitis instead asks him to become Werner’s top dealer to gain his trust. Werner’s sister, Taya, falls for Denis, but he rejects her. When Masha finds out about Denis’s involvement in drug trafficking, she leaves for Moscow. Not long after, Pulya is killed by a drug-addicted client, and Denis is deeply affected. Taya starts visiting Denis regularly, despite his insistence that he doesn’t love her. One day, she has a breakdown at his place; Werner calms her down, and Dudaitis later reveals that she was traumatized after being held captive by Werner’s rivals.

Werner eventually discovers that Ptica is working with Dudaitis and forces Denis to kill him. Shocked, Denis seeks out Dudaitis, who reveals that he was once a heroin addict himself, buying drugs from Werner. At a meeting between Werner and a rival named Khadzhi, Krot spots Pulya’s killer and shoots him, triggering a violent shootout that leaves most attendees dead and Werner wounded. Denis escapes unscathed, calls Dudaitis, and walks out onto the street. Dudaitis arrives, assures him, “That’s it,” then takes his own life with a gunshot to the head. The film ends with scenes of Moscow’s train station, where Denis and Taya step off a train together.

== Cast ==
- Maksim Matveyev as Denis
- Fedor Bondarchuk as Verner (as Fyodor Bondarchuk)
- Aleksey Serebryakov as Dudaytis
- Evgenia Brik as Taya (as Evgeniya Khirivskaya)
- Ekaterina Vilkova as Masha
- Anton Shagin
- Igor Voynarovskiy
- Konstantin Balakirev
- Denis Yasik
- Denis Balandin as Amigo
