= Fisher (TV series) =

Russian thriller television series

- Фишер
- Genre: Thriller; Drama; Detective
- Written by: Sergei Kalvarsky; Natalia Kapustina
- Directed by: Sergey Taramaev and Lyubov Lvova (Season 1); Alexander Tsoy (Season 2)
- Starring: Aleksandr Yatsenko; Ivan Yankovsky; Aleksandra Bortich; Irina Starshenbaum; Nikita Khudyakov
- Country of origin: Russia
- Original language: Russian
- No. of seasons: 2
- No. of episodes: 16

Production
- Producers: Vyacheslav Murugov; Fyodor Bondarchuk; Dmitry Tabarchuk; Maxim Rybakov; Sergei Kalvarsky; Zhora Kryzhovnikov; Denis Utochkin; Natalia Kapustina; Gennady Kuznetsov
- Production location: Moscow
- Cinematography: Ivan Lebedev (Season 1); Maxim Asadchiy (Season 2)
- Running time: 50–64 min
- Production companies: Art Pictures Vision (Season 1); Studio 812

Original release
- Network: more.tv (Season 1); Wink
- Release: February 8, 2023 – present

Fisher (Russian: Фишер) is a Russian thriller television series. The project was produced by Art Pictures Vision in association with Studio 812 for NMG Studio.

The plot of the first season is based on real events—"Fisher" was the nickname of Sergey Golovkin, a serial killer who operated in the Odintsovsky District of Moscow Oblast between 1986 and 1992. The basis for the second season has not been officially revealed by the creators, though theories suggest cases such as the Gabidullin brothers or Sergey Chorny.

The first season premiered on 8 February 2023 on the streaming platforms more.tv and Wink. The second season premiered on 29 May 2025 on Wink.

== Synopsis ==
=== Season 1 ===
In 1986, the bodies of brutally murdered teenagers are found in a forest belt near the Rublyovskoye Highway in Moscow. A team consisting of experienced investigators—Valery Kozyrev from Moscow and Evgeny Bokov from Rostov-on-Don—and young investigator Natalya Dobrovolskaya, investigate a series of murders that will change their lives forever. They are assisted by the only witness, a schoolboy named Igor.

=== Season 2 ===
A child goes missing in a resort town in southern Russia. His mother delivers a note to Evgeny Bokov asking for help with the investigation. It soon becomes clear that kidnapping is only the beginning: a psychopathic killer is operating in the city, sophisticatedly murdering young women.

== Cast ==
=== Main cast ===
- Ivan Yankovsky as Evgeny Bokov (Seasons 1–2)
- Aleksandr Yatsenko as Valery Kozyrev (Seasons 1–2)
- Aleksandra Bortich as Natalya Dobrovolskaya (Season 1)
- Irina Starshenbaum as Nadezhda Raikina (Season 2)
- Nikita Khudyakov as Ivan Zlobin (Season 2)

=== Supporting cast ===
- Sergey Gilyov as Gennady Maltsev, a journalist and Igor's father (Season 1)
- Anna Snatkina as Maria Maltseva, Igor's mother (Season 1)
- Stanislav Solomatin as Igor Maltsev (Season 1)
- Roman Evdokimov as Dmitry Laval (Season 1)
- Yuri Torsuev as Pyotr Laval (Season 1)
- Azamat Nigmanov as Viktor Khvan (Season 1)
- Diana Milyutina as Marina Bokova (Season 1)
- Dmitry Burenkov as Semyon Makurin (Season 1)
- Olga Kavalay-Aksyonova as Kozyreva (Season 1)
- Olga Ozollapinya as Panova (Season 1)
- Alexey Grishin as Chernyshov (Season 1)
- Fyodor Fedoseev as Stepan Kozyrev (Season 1)
- Alexander Userdin as Aleksandr Rekunkov, Prosecutor General of the USSR (Season 1)
- Nikita Tarasov as Anatoly Slivko (Season 1)
- Andrey Maximov as Sergey Golovkin ("Fisher") (Seasons 1–2)
- Aleksandra Rebenok as the Mayor (Season 2)
- Darya Vereshchagina as Lyuba (Season 2)
- Alexey Agranovich as Gleb (Season 2)
- Stepan Devonin as Andrey Fanin (Season 2)
- Boris Kamorzin as the Prosecutor General (Season 2)
- Alyona Dolgolenko as Nadezhda's sister (Season 2)

== Episodes ==
Season	Episodes	Originally aired
1	8	8 February – 29 March 2023
2 (Eclipse)	8	29 May – 17 July 2025

== Production ==
The project was announced in December 2019. Screenwriters Sergey Kalvarsky and Natalia Kapustina spent a year studying archival materials and interviewing investigators from the Sergey Golovkin case to develop the script.

Filming began in June 2022 in Moscow. The series premiered on 8 February 2023 on more.tv and Wink.

In November 2024, production began on an 8-episode second season titled Fisher. Eclipse. Ivan Yankovsky, Aleksandr Yatsenko, and Andrey Maximov reprised their roles. Filming took place in Moscow, the Moscow region, and Abkhazia, concluding on 26 February 2025.

== Awards and nominations ==
- The series won two Golden Eagle Awards for 2023: "Best Online Platform Project" and "Best Actor in an Online Series" (shared by Ivan Yankovsky and Aleksandr Yatsenko).
- 2023 — The Hollywood Reporter Russia "Event of the Year" Award: Actor of the Year (Ivan Yankovsky) for his roles in Fisher, Volunteer's Playlist, and The Boy's Word: Blood on the Asphalt.
- 2023 — "Star of the Theater-Goer" (Zvezda Teatrala) Award: Best Role of a Theater Actor in Cinema (Ivan Yankovsky).
