= Ivan Yankovsky =

Russian actor (born 1990)

- Иван Янковский
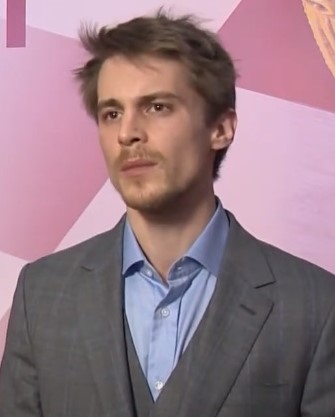
- Yankovsky in 2021
- Born: Ivan Filippovich Yankovsky; October 30, 1990 (age 35); Moscow, RSFSR, USSR
- Occupation: Actor
- Years active: 2001–present
- Awards: Golden Eagle Award (Russia)

Ivan Filippovich Yankovsky (Russian: Иван Филиппович Янковский; born October 30, 1990) is a Russian actor, best known for his roles in Rag Union and The Boy's Word: Blood on the Asphalt. His father is actor and filmmaker Filipp Yankovsky, and his grandfather was the actor Oleg Yankovsky.

== Early life and education ==
Ivan Yankovsky was born in Moscow, Russian SFSR, Soviet Union to actor and filmmaker Filipp Yankovsky and actress Oksana Fandera. His sister Elizaveta is also an actress.

From the 8th grade, he studied at the Moscow International Film School, after which he entered the Russian Institute of Theatre Arts. In 2013, he graduated from the acting and directing department (workshop of Sergey Zhenovach).

== Personal life ==
From 2014 to 2020, he was in a relationship with Vera Kincheva, the daughter of Konstantin Kinchev.

Since 2020, Ivan Yankovsky has been in a relationship with actress Diana Pozharskaya. On June 26, 2021, in Moscow, their son was born, who was named after Ivan's famous grandfather—the Russian actor Oleg Yankovsky.

== Career ==
Ivan Yankovsky made his cinematic debut at the age of 10 in the film Come Look at Me (2001). His first major success and public recognition came after his role as Andrei Kalyaev in the film Indigo (2008), which tells the story of people with superpowers. Yankovsky's character, in particular, possesses the ability to anticipate danger and foresee events.

He starred in the film Rag Union (2015), directed by Mikhail Mestetskiy. According to Yankovsky, he was closely related to the character he portrayed on screen: "This character is not frivolous – he is ideological, he gathers and leads everyone. But when he realizes that none of it makes sense and that it would be better to go to university, he decides: 'Let's cancel everything.' This self-doubt and soul-searching, which are inherent to him, are also familiar to me."

In 2015, he won the "Best Actor" award (alongside Vasily Butkevitch, Aleksandr Pal, and Pavel Chinarev) for Rag Union at the XXVI Open Russian Film Festival "Kinotavr".

Among his other notable roles was Pasha Smolnikov in the Russian fantasy film Guardians of the Night (2016). His character is a courier working in a department that combats werewolves and witches. Regarding his work on the film, which involved numerous stunts, Yankovsky noted that his strong physical conditioning was an advantage: "For example, I can hang and stay suspended upside down in the air for a long time."

In the thriller The Queen of Spades (2016), he played Andrei, a young opera singer striving to secure the role of Hermann in The Queen of Spades - his chance at fame. However, an experienced opera diva, Anna, takes advantage of his ambition and ensnares him in a dangerous game. For his performance in The Queen of Spades, Yankovsky won the Best Leading Actor award at the Golden Eagle awards.

Yankovsky starred in The Factory (2018), a dramatic thriller directed by Yuri Bykov, and played a leading role in Text (2019), a psychological drama based on the novel by Dmitry Glukhovsky.

In 2019, he appeared in the historical drama Union of Salvation, portraying Decembrist leader Mikhail Bestuzhev-Ryumin. He later reprised this role in the 2022 series Union of Salvation: Time of Wrath, which explored the events leading up to the Decembrist revolt.

Yankovsky played a significant role in Champion of the World (2021), portraying chess grandmaster Anatoly Karpov in a film about his 1978 World Chess Championship match against Viktor Korchnoi. His performance earned him the Golden Eagle Award for Best Actor.

In 2023, he starred in the crime drama Fisher, based on the real-life case of Soviet serial killer Sergey Golovkin. His portrayal of detective Yevgeny Bokov earned him critical recognition, and he won the Zvezda Teatrala award for Best Theatrical Actor in Cinema. In early 2024, the same role earned him another Golden Eagle Award.

He also took on the lead role in Playlist of a Volunteer, where he played a disillusioned man undergoing a personal transformation. Additionally, he starred as Rodion Raskolnikov in a television adaptation of Fyodor Dostoevsky's Crime and Punishment, though the series received mixed reviews.

In late 2023, Yankovsky played a major role in the series The Boy's Word: Blood on the Asphalt, which focused on criminal gangs in post-Soviet Russia. The show gained significant attention and was compared to Brigada, a cult Russian crime series.

== Selected filmography ==
Year	Title	Role	Notes
2001	Come Look at Me	The Boy with Banana Skin	
2008	Indigo	Andrei Kalyaev	
2015	Rag Union	Andrei	
2015	Without Borders	Artyom	
2016	Guardians of the Night	Pasha Smolnikov	
2016	The Queen of Spades	Andrei	
2018	The Factory	Vovka	
2019	Icaria	Anton	
2019	Union of Salvation	Mikhail Bestuzhev-Ryumin, podporuchik of the Poltava Infantry Regiment	Films based on Union of Salvation
2020	Fire	Roman Ilyin	
2021	Don't Heal Me	Ilya Tretyakov	
2021	Champion of the World	Anatoly Karpov	
2022	No Crying	Aleksey	
2023	The Boy's Word: Blood on the Asphalt	Vova Adidas	TV Series
2023	Fisher	Evgeny Bokov	TV series
2024	Crime and Punishment	Rodion Raskolnikov	TV Series
2026	Battle of Engines	Andrei Nagel	
