= Yuliya Aleksandrova =

Russian actress

- Юлия Александрова
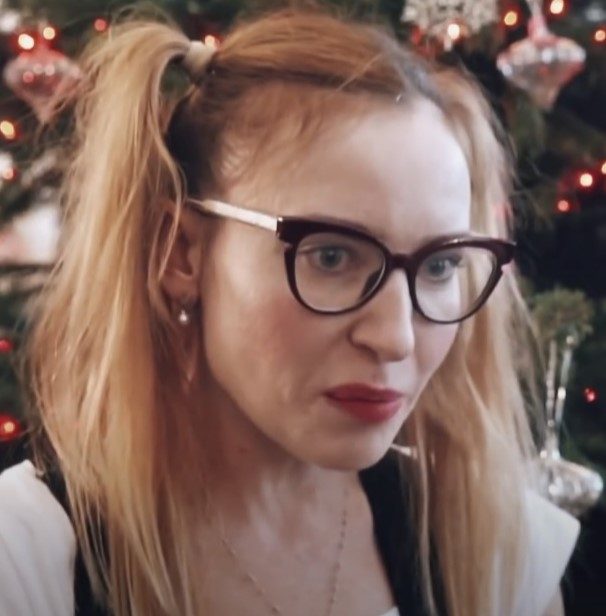
- Aleksandrova in 2019
- Born: Yuliya Igorevna Aleksandrova; April 14, 1982; Moscow, RSFSR, USSR
- Occupation: Actress
- Years active: 2004–present
- Height: 162 cm (5 ft 4 in)
- Spouse: Zhora Kryzhovnikov (m. 2009; div. 2021)
- Children: 1

Yuliya Igorevna Aleksandrova (Russian: Ю́лия И́горевна Алекса́ндрова; born April 14, 1982) is a Russian actress. She appeared in more than 40 films since 2009.

== Biography ==
Yuliya Aleksandrova was born on April 14, 1982. She studied at Russian Institute of Theatre Arts, after which she began working at the ApARTe theater.

== Selected filmography ==
Year	Title	Role	Notes
2004	Daddy	student	
2008	Everybody Dies but Me	Nastya	
2013	Kiss Them All!	Natasha	
2015	The Very Best Day	Olya	
2017	Yolki 6	Marina	
2018	Yolki 7	Marina	
2018	Call DiCaprio!	Marina Ivanovskaya	
2021	Koschey: The Everlasting Story	Mary (voice)	
2023	The Boy's Word: Blood on the Asphalt	Svetlana, Andrey's mother	
