= Vladislav Vetrov =

Russian actor

- Владислав Ветров
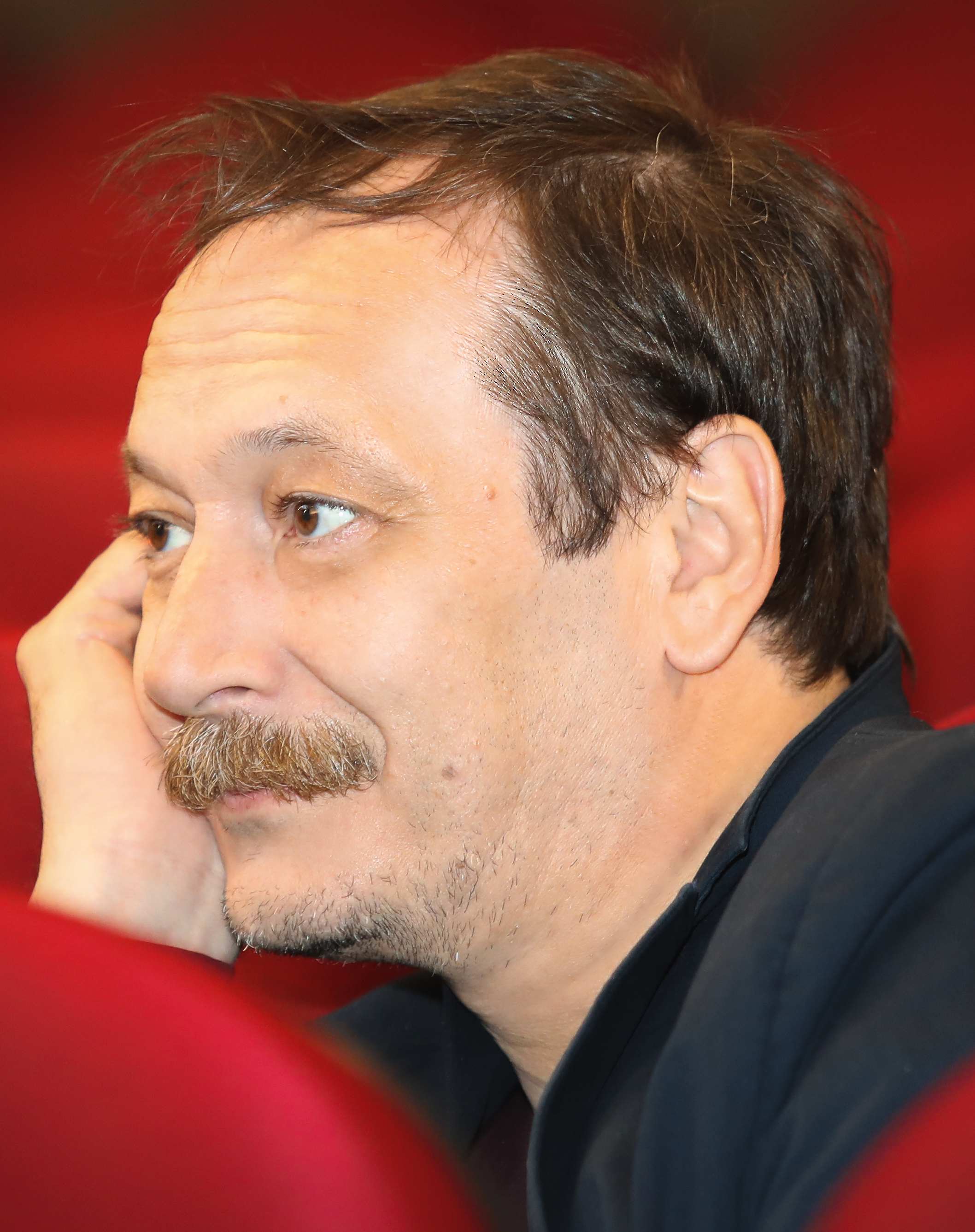
- Vetrov in 2017
- Born: Vladislav Vladimirovich Vetrov; 9 February 1964 (age 62); Senaki, Georgian SSR, Soviet Union
- Citizenship: Soviet Union; Russia
- Occupations: Actor, director, writer
- Years active: 1986–present
- Spouse: Yekaterina Kirchak
- Children: 3
- Awards: Merited Artist of Russia (1998); People's Artist of Russia (2022)

Vladislav Vladimirovich Vetrov (Russian: Владислав Владимирович Ветров; born 9 February 1964) is a Soviet and Russian theater and film actor, director and writer.

== Biography ==
Vladislav Vetrov was born in Senaki, Georgian SSR, Soviet Union (now Georgia), moved to Taganrog, Rostov Oblast. He studied at the People's Drama Theatre at the House of teacher and worked at the Taganrog Theatre.

In 1986 he graduated from the Taganrog Institute of Radio Engineering. On stage since 1985. He worked at the Riga Russian Theatre, Anatoly Vasiliev's School of Dramatic Arts in Moscow, Mikhail Butkevich's Laboratory. From 1989 to 1991 he worked at the Maxim Gorky Rostov Drama Theater.

In 1991, Vetrov made his directorial debut on television.

In 1993, he returned to Rostov-on-Don, where he continued to perform leading roles and stage productions at the Rostov Drama Theatre, appeared in commercials, and worked for local television. Since 2002, he has lived and worked in Moscow. That same year, he joined the company of the Sovremennik Theatre.

He is a member of the Union of Theatre Workers of Russia, the Union of Cinematographers of Russia, and the Russian Guild of Film Actors.

In 1998, Vladislav Vetrov was awarded the honorary title of Merited Artist of Russia, and in 2022, that of People's Artist of Russia.

On 8 July 2022, he headed the newly formed Artistic Council of the Sovremennik Theatre, whose members included Alyona Babenko and Svetlana Ivanova. On 6 November 2024, he stepped down as chairman of the theatre's Artistic Council and left the Sovremennik Theatre. In September 2025, he joined the company of the Moscow Art Theatre.

== Filmography ==
=== Films ===
List of film credits
Year	Title	Role	Notes
1991	Anna Karamazoff	Roshchin-Insarov, graphologist	
2007	Gagarin's Grandson	manager of the art shop	
2008	Admiral	Sergey Timiryov	
2010	The Rowan Waltz	Kirillov	
2011	The Schism	Afanasy Ordin-Nashchokin	
2015	The Very Best Day	Vikenty Mikhailovich	
2016	The Heritage of Love	Prince Alexander Chernyshev	
2017	Not Yet Evening	Anton Chekhov	
2017	Yolki 6	Captain Chebotaryov	
2019	Union of Salvation	Lieutenant colonel Gustav Gebel, commander of the Chernigov Regiment	
2020	One Breath	sports doctor	
2021	The Last Warrior: Root of Evil; The Last Warrior 2	Belogor / Rogoleb	
2021	Koschey: The Everlasting Story	Likho (voice)	
2021	The Last Warrior: A Messenger of Darkness; The Last Warrior 3	Belogor	
2022	The One	Viktor Savitsky	

=== TV Series ===
List of television credits
Year	Title	Role	Notes
1992	Smoke	Litvinov	
1993	I Shall Repay	Kazimierz Łyszczyński	
2005	Kamenskaya	Ruslan Nilsky	
2008	Gogol: The Portrait of the Mysterious Genius	Nikolai Gogol	
2009	Ivan the Terrible	Vasili III of Russia	
2010	The Tower	Batashov	
2015	The Method	Dean Tsvetkov	
2016	Hotel Eleon	Boris Leonidovich Zavgorodny (Uncle Borya), the hotel's manager of engineering	
2017	Vlasik. The Stalin's Shadow	Vyacheslav Menzhinsky	
2018	The Junior Team	Vasily Stepanovich Goryachkin, Senior Warrant Officer	
2018	The Manumission	Alexey Golovin	
2021	Murderous Fervour	Kirichenkov	
