= No Crying =

- Плакать нельзя
- Directed by: Natalia Nazarova
- Written by: Natalia Nazarova, Dmitry Konstantinov
- Starring: Svetlana Chuykina; Vladimir Levchenko; Ivan Yankovsky; Jonathan Solway
- Cinematography: Yuri Nikogosov
- Music by: Aleksey Aygi
- Release date: October 20, 2022 (Russia)
- Country: Russia
- Language: Russian

No Crying (Russian: Плакать нельзя, romanized: Plakat nelzya) is a 2022 Russian dramatic thriller film directed by Natalia Nazarova. It was later released in an extended version as a four-episode mini-series.

== Plot ==
Tatiana Olsen, a Russian emigrant living in an unnamed Scandinavian country, has a seemingly perfect life with her husband, Ingvar Olsen, and their ten-year-old son, Kolya. However, her world is shattered when Kolya does not return home from school. Authorities remove him due to a minor argument, which is used as grounds for separation. A social worker named Hilda views Tatiana as an unemployed immigrant unwilling to conform to European customs.

According to the filmmakers, the story is inspired by real-life cases of children being removed from families in Europe. Director Natalia Nazarova has stated that the film explores themes of betrayal while avoiding demonizing social services.

== Cast ==
- Svetlana Chuykina as Tatiana Olsen
- Vladimir Levchenko as Nikolai Olsen
- Ivan Yankovsky as Alexei
- Jonathan Solway as Ingvar Olsen
- Katharina Spiering as Hilda
- Dirk Martens as Gustav
- Vadim Stepanov as Thomas
- Ekaterina Vasilyeva as Greta
- Mindaugas Papinigis as Senior Caretaker

== Release ==
The film premiered at the Oktyabr Cinema Center in Moscow and was released theatrically in Russia on 10.20.2022. In late 2022, an extended four-episode miniseries version was released on Kinopoisk, Okko and Ivi.

In 2024, the miniseries was acquired by the Polish company Media4Fun for streaming services, making it one of the few Russian series purchased by foreign distributors.

== Festival screenings and awards ==
- Amur Autumn Film Festival (XX Edition) – Best Director (Natalia Nazarova)
- Listapad Minsk International Film Festival (XXVIII Edition) – Opening film, Official Competition, Best Actress (Svetlana Chuykina)
- Eurasian Bridge Film Festival (VI Edition) – Opening film (out of competition)

== Reception ==
The film received mixed reviews. Some critics praised its performances and social commentary, while others criticized its portrayal of European social services.
