= Scenes of Friendly Ties =

- Directed by: Sofya Rayzman
- Written by: Sofya Rayzman
- Produced by: Pavel Karykhalin; Sergey Yahontov; Alexander Medvedko; Gosha Tokaev; Andrei Manik; Vladimir Komarov
- Starring: Aleksandr Pal; Maria Karpova; Sofya Rayzman; Iskander Shaykhutdinov; Ruslan Bratov; Mikhail Khuranov; Igor Tsaregorodtsev; Gosha Tokaev; Yevgeny Tsyganov
- Cinematography: Aleksandr Ponomaryov
- Edited by: Roman Geigert
- Production companies: Stereotactic; Lake
- Distributed by: Pioneer Film Distribution
- Release dates: October 6, 2025 (Gelendzhik); March 19, 2026 (Russia)
- Running time: 100 minutes
- Country: Russia
- Language: Russian

Scenes of Friendly Ties (Russian: Картины дружеских связей) is a 2025 Russian black-and-white comedy-drama film written and directed by theater and film actress Sofya Rayzman. The film takes place on a winter day. It tells the story of former classmates who must overcome a series of difficulties to see off Sasha, who is about to leave Moscow.

The film premiered on October 6, 2025, at the Mayak 2025 Film Festival in Gelendzhik. This film was theatrically released on March 19, 2026.

== Plot ==
One winter day and night. A group of fellow students are seeing off Sasha, an actor who is leaving Moscow for a long time (possibly forever). Over the course of 24 hours, the characters face everyday challenges, creative problems, and personal ones.

== Cast ==
- Aleksandr Pal as Sasha
- Maria Karpova as Masha
- Sofya Rayzman as Tanya
- Iskander Shaykhutdinov as Ilya
- Ruslan Bratov as Rustam
- Mikhail Khuranov as Misha
- Igor Tsaregorodtsev as Danila
- Gosha Tokaev as Gosha
- Yevgeny Tsyganov as Oleg
- Dima Cherny as Dima
- Irina Martynenko as Nika
