= Kazan phenomenon =

Youth street gangs in Kazan, Soviet Union, in the 1970s and 1980s

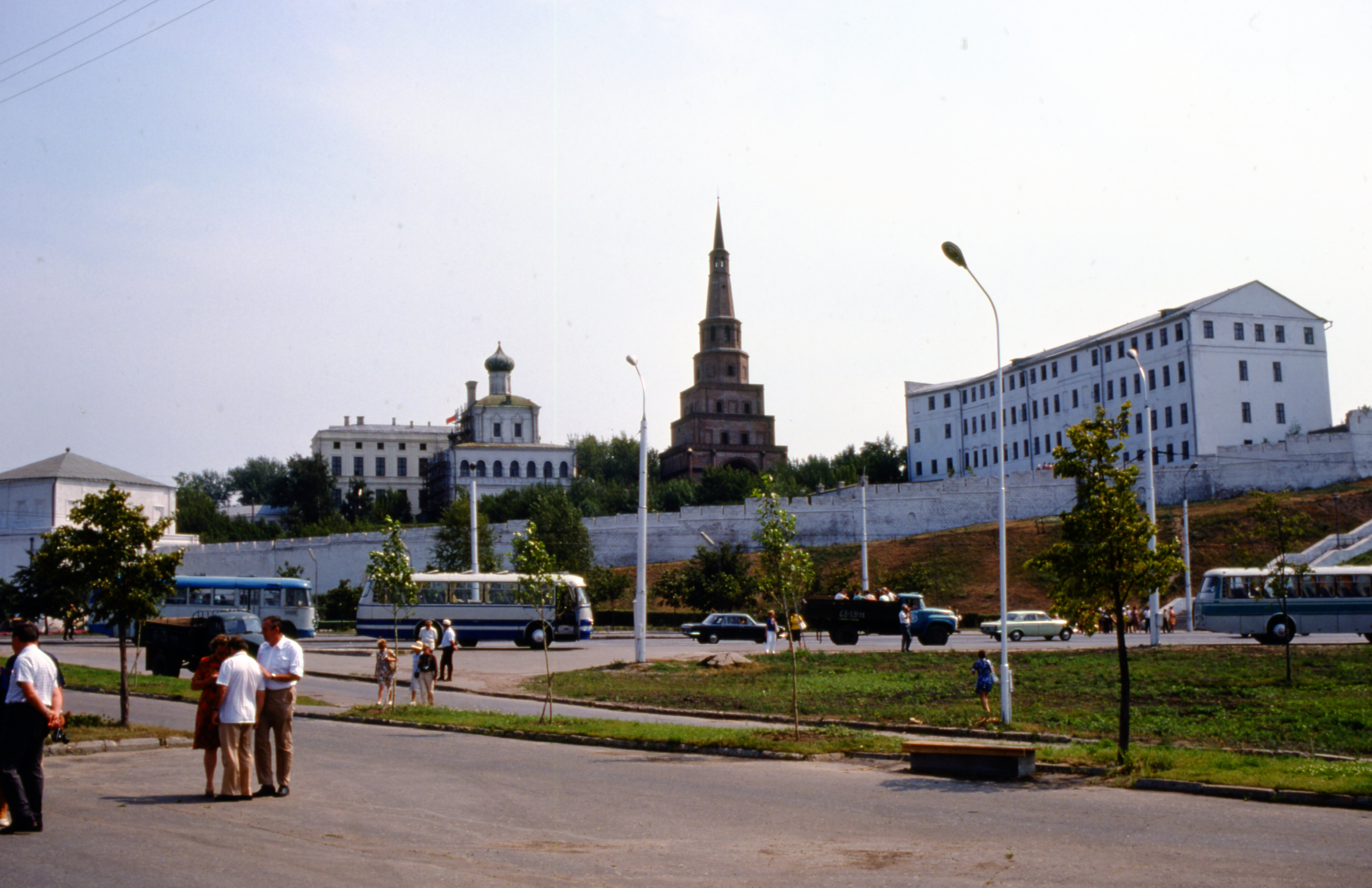
The Kazan Kremlin and the Söyembikä Tower in 1975

The Kazan phenomenon (Russian: Казанский феномен, Kazanskiy fenomen) was a term used by journalists to describe the rise in juvenile street-gang activity in the city of Kazan in the RSFSR and later, the Russian Federation.

From the early 1970s, Kazan had a particularly bad reputation for juvenile delinquency, and a substantial portion of young males in the area of both Russian and Tatar background joined youth gangs, which fought amongst each other for territory, principally using improvised or melee weapons (at the time firearms were not widespread in Russia and were hard to come by). Between 1985 and 1999 the rate of crimes committed by sixteen- to twenty-nine-year-olds in Tatarstan (until 1992 the Tatar ASSR) increased 1.7 times. Struggles for domination of public space, where success in the appropriation of resources was often predicated on one's aptitude and skills in violence, forced many young men unaffiliated with gangs to reconsider their options in the face of increasing insecurity. The crime wave caused a moral panic amongst the Soviet population, as not only was such criminality traditionally seen as a product of the capitalist West, but it also involved the children of local officials.

During the rise of the Russian mafia in the late 1980s and 1990s, the street gangs grew into more sophisticated and organised criminal enterprises. Due to the lack of profitability in running protection rackets in Tatarstan, the Kazan gangs started to move to St Petersburg, where they got into conflict with the local Tambov gang. The Kazan mafia was known to be particularly cruel in their extortion tactics, and periodically brought in reinforcements from Tatarstan. The Slavic gangsters of the city banded together to fight this emerging threat, and eventually forced the Tatars out of St Petersburg.

== Emergence ==
The breakdown of the key institutions of the Soviet state—the command economy, the state and legal apparatus, and the enterprise-based social welfare system—was accompanied by a violent division of assets and resources. State companies, now being privatized, began to operate in an unfamiliar market environment. Ordinary business functions such as raising capital, ensuring supplies, and making customers pay for goods and services could be extremely difficult to carry out and fraught with danger. Not only was the country in the grip of an economic crisis but the state legal apparatus was inefficient, and a functioning banking system was years away. In this chaotic environment, both public and private companies became besieged by predators who were keen to access their assets and who used threats, bribes, and offers of "protection" to lay their hands on a company's money, products, and shares. In Tatarstan despite the economic crisis, many attractive assets remained. Although by the mid-1990s industrial output in the republic had decreased by 33.9% compared to the beginning of the decade, the economic crisis of the first half of the 1990s was less severe than in most Russian regions. The existence of a large economic base inherited from the Soviet times, together with the historical presence of gangs, helps to explain the particularly rapid development of organized crime in Tatarstan in the 1990s. These newly privatizing companies were exposed to extortion from bandit gangs, or indeed the state security services and police, which emerged as one of the key racketeering groups in post-Soviet Russia. Alongside the ailing ex-Soviet companies there emerged a vast street-level economy and nascent small businesses. The private economic sphere was initially launched during perestroika when Gorbachev’s 1987 Law on Cooperation allowed groups of citizens to establish cooperative businesses. These businesses immediately became targets for racketeers. The first case of racketeering in Kazan was registered in 1988 when the street group Dom Obuvi (literally "House of Shoes," a shoe store) attempted to extort protection money from a builders’ cooperative.

Although at the beginning of the 1990s, most cooperatives disappeared under the pressures of state taxation and competition from new private companies, new small businesses soon began to emerge, mainly in the unregulated informal and semiformal service sector: outdoor markets, small stalls and kiosks, small currency exchange businesses, etc. With hardly any protection from the state, and lacking the means to protect itself, the sector was easy prey for a variety of predators. All over Russia, street neighbourhood groups were at the forefront of the new processes of accumulation, although the specific dynamics of relationships between street groups and other violent actors still await investigation. In Kazan (and Tatarstan in general) the majority of organized crime groups rose out of street social organizations. The vast majority of these organizations started out as territorial groups of young "hooligans". Contributions to these funds were systematically collected through extortion and other criminal means. In Kazan, most such groups, excluding specialized gangs such as drug gangs, emerged from territorial youth groups. Currently, all such communities have youth gangs as part of their structure.

The main Kazan gruppirovki—Kvartala, Mirnyi, Shatura, 56th Kvartal, Sots-gorod, Telestudiia, Khadi Taktash, Zhilka, Nizy, Boriskovo, Pervaki, Kaluga, Tukaevo— sought to divide the city among them. To retain and expand their control over territory, they needed to mobilize significant forces. They put serious pressure on local young people to join their gangs.

== Social composition ==
At the end of the 1980s, Kazan gang membership was skewed toward working-class young people. In the 1990s this began to change with the massive collapse of livelihoods, these gangs began to draw their members from a wider range of social backgrounds, including young people from educated families. The gangs also began to attract university students. Further, even as street gangs remained a youth phenomenon, their membership was becoming older. Toward the middle of the 1990s, a significant proportion of members were over twenty-five, and many were in legitimate employment. The ethnic backgrounds of gang members tended to be representative of the local population, although gangs formed by communities of migrants (Georgians, Azerbaijani, Chechens, Dagestani) also appeared across Russia. The Tatarstan gangs were ethnically mixed, uniting Russians and Tatars and any other ethnicities living in their neighbourhoods.

== See also ==
- The Boy's Word: Blood on the Asphalt
- Gopniki
- Thief in law
- Solntsevskaya Bratva
