= Rag Union =

- Directed by: Mikhail Mestetsky
- Written by: Mikhail Mestetsky
- Starring: Vasiliy Butkevich; Pavel Chinaryov
- Release date: 10 June 2015 (Kinotavr)
- Running time: 97 min
- Country: Russia
- Language: Russian

Rag Union (Russian: Тряпичный союз, romanized: Tryapichnyy soyuz) is a 2015 Russian teen comedy film directed by Mikhail Mestetsky.

The film was screened at the Berlinale in the Generation 14plus section.

In 2017, HBO purchased the rights to show the film on the HBO Central Europe channel.

== Plot ==
An ordinary Moscow guy, Vanya, after finishing school, goes to work as a "living advertisement" of monument-tombstones. At the cemetery, he meets three energetic guys - either a section, or a sect that calls itself the "Rag Union". Vanya asks to take him to their training sessions, and they settle for a month at Vanya's dacha.

== Cast ==
- Vasily Butkevich as Vanya
- Aleksandr Pal as Popov
- Ivan Yankovsky as Andrey
- Pavel Chinaryov as Pyotr
- Andrey Kryzhniy as Leader
- Anastasia Pronina as Sasha

== Awards ==
The film's acting ensemble received the award for Best Actor at the Kinotavr, which occurred for the first time in the festival's history.
