= Battle of Engines =

- Theatrical release poster
- Directed by: Ilya Malanin
- Written by: Andrey Kurganov
- Produced by: Petr Anurov (ru); Vadim Vereshchagin; Leonid Vereshchagin (ru); Nikita Mikhalkov; Grigory Stoyalov; Danil Badreev; Natalya Smirnova; Tatyana Bonakova; Yakov Gordin; Anastasia Kalashnikova
- Starring: Ivan Yankovskiy; Yura Borisov; Paulina Andreeva; Aleksei Guskov; Aleksey Rozin
- Cinematography: Michael Hasaya
- Edited by: Dimitri Komm
- Music by: Ryan Otter
- Production companies: Central Partnership Productions; Gazprom-Media; Kinoslovo; Studio Globus; Studio TriTe
- Distributed by: Central Partnership
- Release dates: October 1, 2026 (Moscow); October 8, 2026 (Russia)
- Running time: 144 minutes
- Country: Russia
- Language: Russian
- Budget: ₽1.414 billion
- Box office: ₽1.142 billion

Battle of Engines, also known as Race to Monte Carlo (Russian: Битва моторов) is a 2026 Russian adventure film directed by Ilya Malanin, which tells about the origins of the domestic automotive industry. The script for the film was written by Andrey Kurganov. Based on real events related to the Russo-Balt car and the participation of the Russian team in the Monte Carlo Rally in 1912 under the leadership of racing driver and journalist Andrei Nagel. It stars Ivan Yankovsky and Yura Borisov. The film's cinematographer was Michael Hasaya.

The film has a secular premiere at their “KARO 11 October” in Moscow on October 1, 2026, and was theatrically released in Russia by Central Partnership on October 8.

== Plot ==
The story unfolds in 1908 in Saint Petersburg, Russian Empire. Andrei Nagel, editor-in-chief of Automobile magazine, meets Dmitri Bondarev, a talented engineer. Together they come up with an ambitious idea — to create the first domestic production car at the Russo-Baltic Wagon Factory in Riga.

The project is facing serious skepticism from officials and investors. To prove the car's competitiveness to the whole world and save production from closure, Nagel and Bondarev decide to take a risky step — to take part in the prestigious Monaco International Rally, which runs through Europe in harsh winter conditions.

== Cast ==
- Ivan Yankovsky as Andrei Nagel (also Andrey Nagel), journalist and race car driver
- Yura Borisov as Dmitri Bondarev (also Dmitry Bondarev), chief engineer of the automotive department at the Russo-Baltic Wagon Factory
- Paulina Andreeva as Lidiya, Andrei Nagel's wife
- Aleksei Guskov as Mikhail Shidlovski, Chairman of the Board of the Russo-Baltic Wagon Factory
- Aleksey Rozin as Petr Stepanov (also Pyotr Stepanov), an engineer
- Anton Rogachev as Ivan Ivanov
- Igor Grabuzov as Egor Polosukhin
- Daria Mureeva as Nadezhda Bondareva
- Yehezkel Lazarov as Gustav List, an entrepreneur
- Sergey Volkov as Emperor Nicholas II

== Production ==
=== Development ===
Director Ilya Malanin conceived the film several years before production began, after learning about the origins of the Russian automotive industry and discovering that, prior to the Revolution, domestic cars had competed with German and French models. Plans by Central Partnership and the production company Kinoslovo to make a film about Russian drivers competing in the Monte Carlo Rally were officially announced in April 2024. That November, the project was presented at the Cinema Fund Russia’s pitching session.

=== Casting ===
A Russo-Balt C24-30 replica at the "ProDvizhenie" car festival, held at VDNKh in Moscow in August 2025.

A replica car from the set of the "Bibip-Bibop" festival in Moscow in 2026.

It was also revealed at that time that Nikita Mikhalkov’s Studio TriTe had joined the project, Yura Borisov and Ivan Yankovsky had been cast in the lead roles, and filming was scheduled to begin in January 2025.

=== Filming ===
Principal photography began in February 2025 in Saint Petersburg and the Leningrad Oblast, taking place across several locations.

Scenes depicting historical St. Petersburg were shot at the Russian Museum of Ethnography, the State Russian Museum, the City Court, and Vitebsky railway station. Large-scale sequences featuring car races and vehicle testing were filmed at an abandoned airfield in the town of Lyuban, Leningrad Oblast. The production team then moved to Montenegro, where the natural landscapes were suitable for scenes set in the south of France—specifically Avignon and Besançon. The sequence showing the "Russo-Balt" crossing the Alps was filmed near the Serbian border.

The final scenes were shot during the autumn and winter of that same year in St. Petersburg and Moscow. Vintage cars were designed and built specifically for the film using photographs and 3D modeling, and the actual "Russo-Balt" vehicle driven by Andrei Nagel in the race was recreated. Principal photography concluded on January 15, 2026.

== Release ==
The nationwide premiere was held by the distributor Central Partnership on October 8, 2026.

=== Theatrical ===
Battle of Engines had its premiere at their “KARO 11 October” cinema center on New Arbat Avenue in Moscow on October 1, 2026, and was theatrically released in the Russian Federation by Central Partnership on October 8.
