= Alexander Kargaltsev =

Russian-American artist, writer and photographer

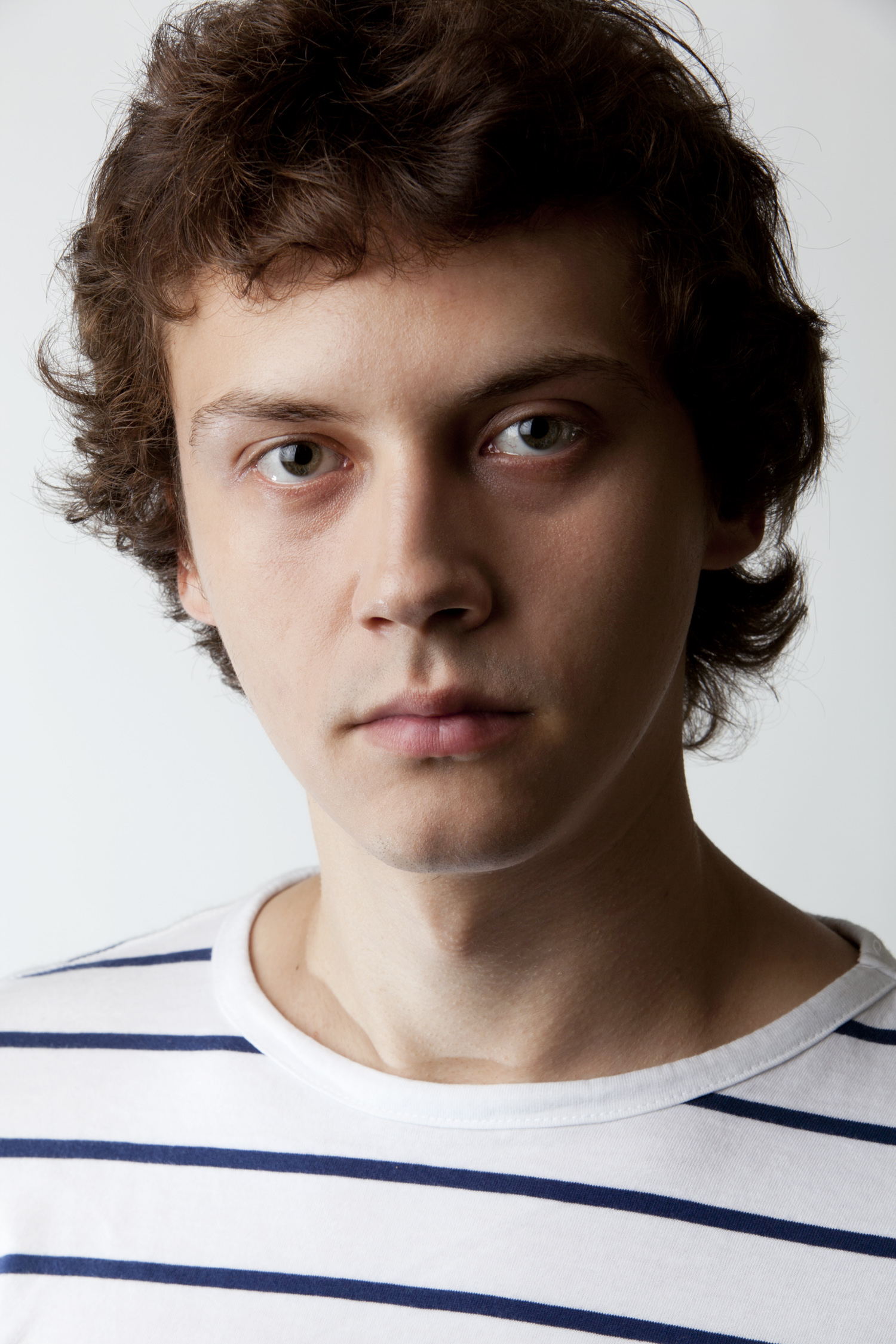
- Born: 1985; Moscow, Russia
- Known for: Photography, theatre, cinema
- Movement: Contemporary art

Alexander "Sasha" Kargaltsev (born 1985) is a Russian-born American artist, writer, photographer, actor and film director.

== Biography ==
Alexander Kargaltsev was born in Moscow. He came to New York in 2010 to study at the New York Film Academy. He never came back to Russia after applying for asylum in the United States. As a photographer, Kargaltsev is known for his series of nude male portraiture. In 2012 he published a book Asylum with nude portraits of Russian gay asylum seekers in the United States. His activism works also included organization of a protest against IKEA for the removal of a photograph of a lesbian couple from the Russian edition of Ikea Family Live magazine.

== Career ==
His short movies, The Cell (2010) and The Well (2009) won him a scholarship at the Russian State University of Cinematography. Kargaltsev moved to New York City in 2009 after winning a scholarship to the New York Film Academy and applied for asylum in the United States, citing persecution, based on his sexual orientation. Kargaltsev's asylum was approved in May 2011 after nine months of hearings. The evidences gathered was presented to USA Immigration and Naturalization Services.

Kargaltsev's debut as a theatre director was the play The Net, staged in Dixon Place in New York. He directed the play Crematorium, based on a story written by Russian playwright Valeriy Pecheykin. The play was staged in its abridged version at New York's Shelter Studios and Gene Frankel Theatre.

At the time of the 2014 Winter Olympics, Alexander Kargaltsev responded to a controversial photo of Russian-American gallerist Dasha Zhukova. On her photo, she is sitting on a chair composed of a semi-nude black woman with her legs up in the air. In order to reverse the “Visual injustice and offense” of Zhukova's image, Kargaltsev created the image with a naked Afro-American man, who is sitting on a naked white man on his back with his legs aloft.

=== Disassembled and New Photographic Technique ===
In October 2017, Kargaltsev unveiled Disassembled, a series of works on paper exhibited at the Fridman Gallery in SoHo, New York, from October 22–25. For this project, he developed a novel technique involving the transfer of instant-film emulsion onto paper, creating unique visual textures and effects. This method marked a departure from his earlier photographic work, such as the nude portraiture of Asylum (2012), by exploring experimental processes that combined photography with mixed media. The Disassembled series reflected Kargaltsev’s continued engagement with themes of identity and displacement, drawing on his experiences as a Russian-born LGBTQ artist and asylee in the United States.

=== Lifeguards Project ===
In 2019, Kargaltsev published Lifeguards, a photobook and documentary project capturing the lives of lifeguards at Long Beach, New York. Conceived as "One Beach, One Day, One Book," the project involved photographing and interviewing lifeguards during a single day, using medium format, digital, 3D, and Polaroid cameras. The resulting images portray a diverse group of lifeguards, from teenagers to seasoned professionals, highlighting their vulnerability and the emotional weight of their responsibilities. Kargaltsev’s photographs emphasize the serene yet melancholic atmosphere of the beach, with shadows and compositions underscoring the lifeguards’ solitude amid their public duties. The project, which also included a documentary component, was partially funded through a Kickstarter campaign launched in March 2019, aiming to explore the evolving role of lifeguards in American culture. Lifeguards builds on Kargaltsev’s earlier work, such as Asylum (2012), by using photography to explore themes of identity and community.

== Exhibitions ==
=== Solo ===
- 2011 Polaroids "Mol'" gallery, Moscow
- 2012 "Asylum". Curated by Ivan Savvine. "287 Spring" Gallery. New York City
- 2014 "Last Polaroids". Leslie Lohman Museum of Gay and Lesbian Art. New York City
- 2017 "Disassembled". Friedman Gallery. New York.

=== Group ===
- 2010 "Hung Checking Out the Contemporary Male". "Gitana Rosa Williamsburg" Gallery. New York City.
- 2013 "Queerussia: the hidden (p)art". 'Mooiman' Gallery. Groningen, Netherlands.
- 2014 "Juicy". "Gitana Rosa Williamsburg" Gallery. New York City.
- 2015 "Same as You". Curated by Igor Zeiger. "Mazeh 9" Municipal youth art center gallery. Tel Aviv
- 2020 "The dark male model, Forbidden words". Galerie MooiMan. Groningen.
- 2020 ""Eros and Thanatos". Curated by Igor Zeiger, "Beam Collective" gallery. Jaffa

== Gallery ==
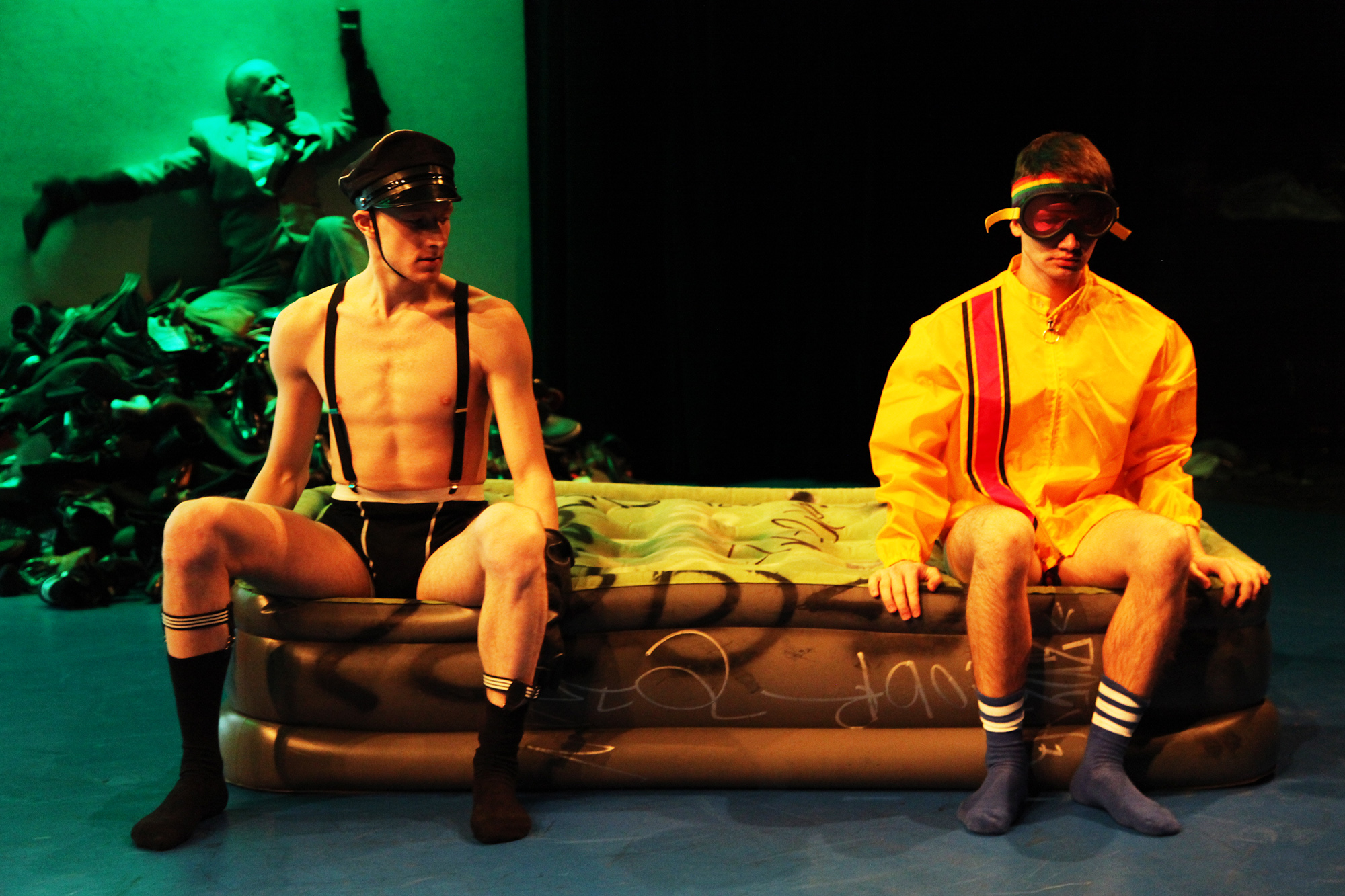
Crematorium for gays, scene from the play.

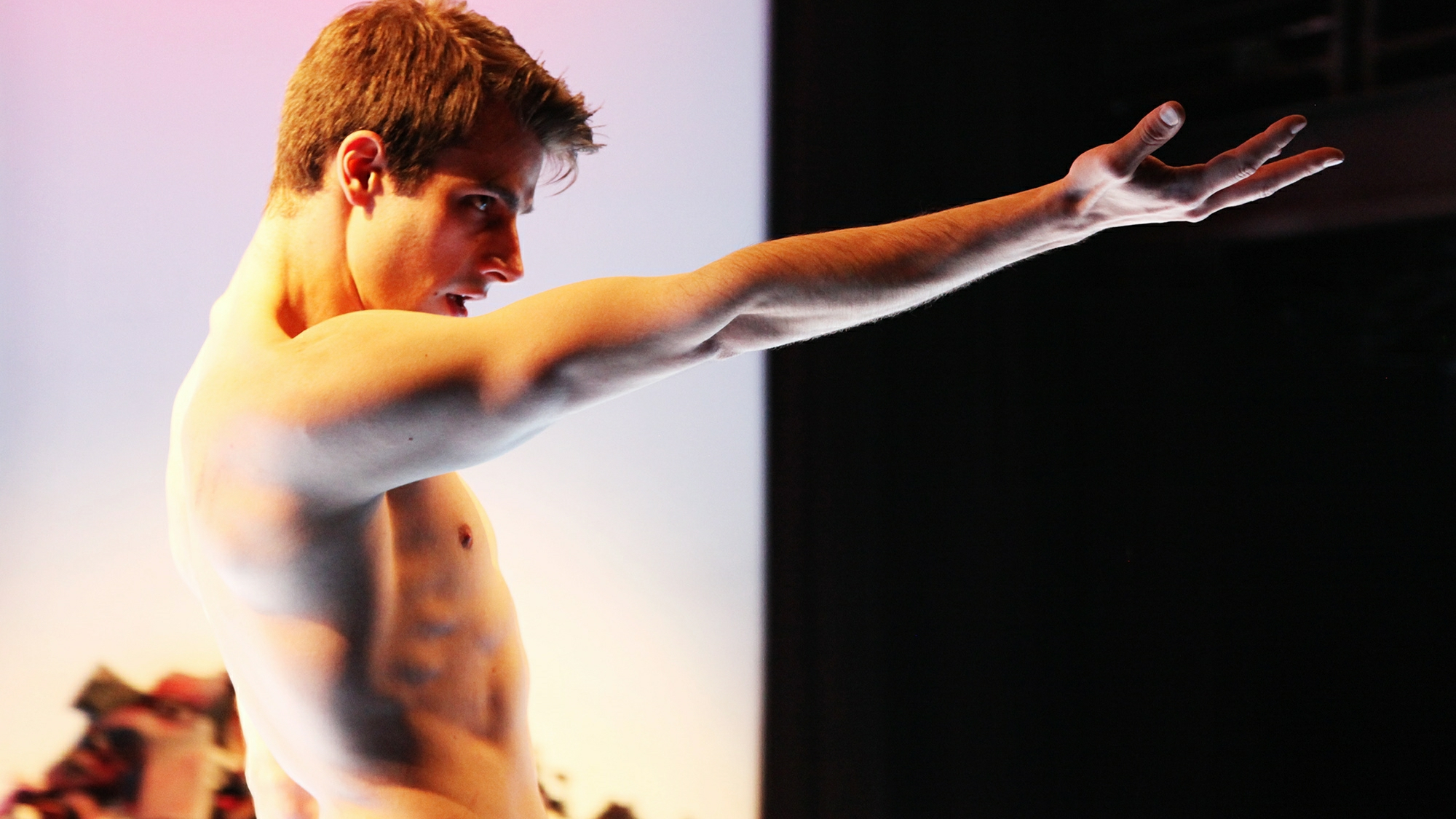
Poster shot for Crematorium.

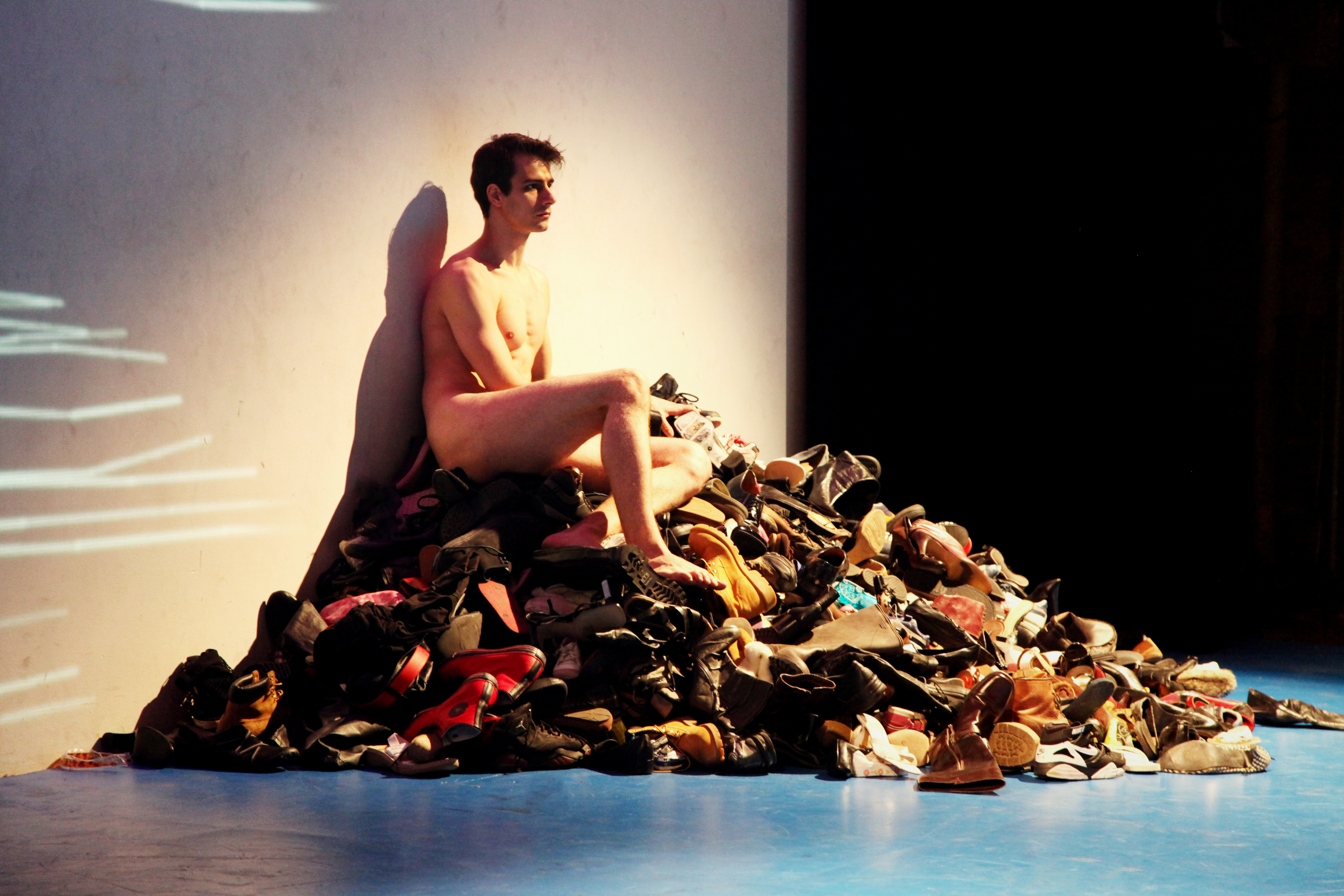
Performance of Crematorium

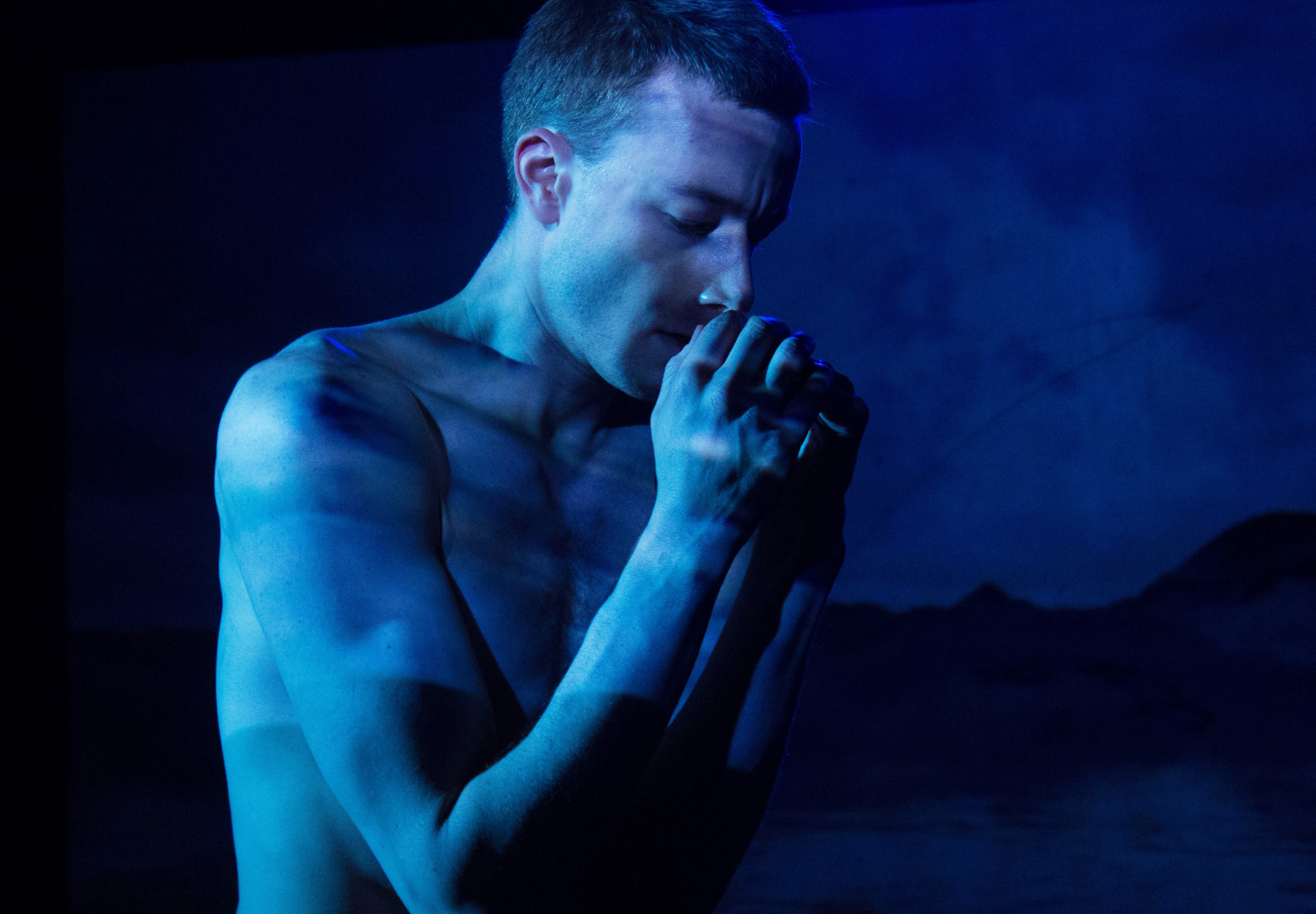
Shot from performance of Crematorium

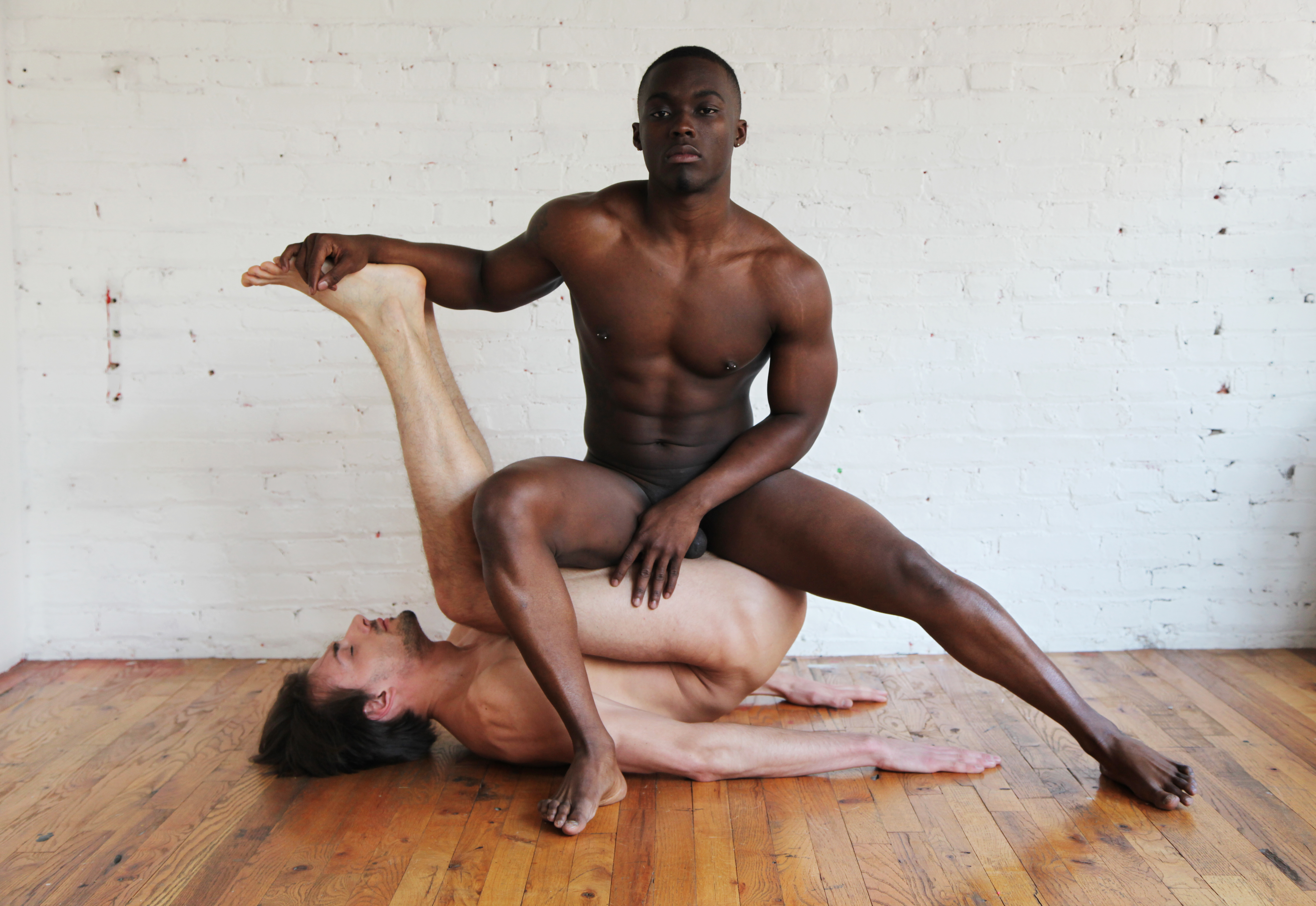
Sasha Kargaltsev's answer to Dasha Zhukova

== Publications ==
- Asylum. Alexander Kargaltsev. 2012. ISBN 978-0-9883289-0-7.

== Collections ==
Kargaltsev's works are in the permanent collection of the Leslie-Lohman Museum of Gay and Lesbian Art.
