= Champion of the World (2021 film) =

- Theatrical release poster
- Directed by: Aleksey Sidorov
- Written by: Aleksey Sidorov
- Produced by: Leonid Vereshchagin; Anton Zlatopolskiy; Nikita Mikhalkov; Rafael Minasbekyan; Aleksey Sidorov; Sergey Gurevich; Mikhail Kitaev
- Starring: Ivan Yankovsky; Konstantin Khabensky; Vladimir Vdovichenkov; Viktor Dobronravov; Viktor Sukhorukov; Diana Pozharskaya
- Cinematography: Mikhail Milashin
- Music by: Artyom Vasilev (ru)
- Production companies: Central Partnership; KIT Film Studio; TriTe Productions; Cinema Fund
- Distributed by: Central Partnership
- Release date: 30 December 2021
- Running time: 121 minutes
- Country: Russia
- Language: Russian
- Budget: ₽550 million

Champion of the World (Russian: Чемпион мира, romanized: Chempion mira) is a 2021 Russian sports drama film written and directed by Aleksey Sidorov. The film tells the story of the rivalry between the Soviet Union's venerable sports artist, chess player Anatoly Karpov, who is competing against Viktor Korchnoi for the title of World Chess Championship.

It was theatrically released on 30 December 2021 by Central Partnership.

The film tells about the famous World Chess Championship in 1978, against the background of which the chess player Anatoly Karpov loses his family, faces the betrayal and intrigues of the CIA, as well as pressure from the party.

== Plot ==
In 1961, in the USSR, chess grandmaster Viktor Korchnoi visits Zlatoust to give a simultaneous exhibition match. During the event, he encounters 10-year-old Anatoly Karpov, a promising young player and local school champion. When Korchnoi deliberately leaves his queen en prise, Karpov refuses to take it, explaining, "It's unsporting—you blundered." Korchnoi sternly responds, "Champions don't forgive mistakes," and punishes Karpov's move.

In 1974, Karpov triumphs over Korchnoi in the Candidates Final, with a score of 3:2 after 19 draws, earning the right to challenge reigning World Champion Bobby Fischer. However, Fischer's conditions for the match are rejected by FIDE, and Karpov is declared World Champion by default. The victory, though official, leaves Karpov disheartened as he yearned to defeat Fischer in a real match. Critics dub him a "paper champion," prompting Karpov to embark on a winning streak, dominating tournaments and silencing doubters. Despite an attempt to arrange an informal meeting with Fischer on the island of Sveti Stefan, the two fail to agree on terms for a match. Fischer, impressed by Karpov's skills, gifts him an engraving of Moritz Retzsch's painting The Chess Players, symbolizing the eternal struggle of the game.

By 1978, Karpov faces Korchnoi again, this time in the World Championship match held in Baguio, Philippines. The match becomes a battleground of psychological warfare, with allegations of cheating, distractions from spiritualists, and even a Geiger counter brought to the board. Both players endure extreme pressure: Korchnoi seeks vindication as a defector, while Karpov fights not only his opponent but also health concerns and political interference from Soviet authorities. Despite setbacks, Karpov outmaneuvers Korchnoi in the 32nd game, securing victory and retaining his title. In a poignant gesture, Karpov sends Korchnoi a copy of Retzsch's The Chess Players along with a note: "Thank you for the game. A. Karpov." The match cements Karpov’s legacy as one of chess history’s greats, while reflecting the intense personal and political stakes of the Cold War era.

== Cast ==
- Ivan Yankovsky as Anatoly Karpov
- Konstantin Khabensky as Viktor Korchnoi
- Vladimir Vdovichenkov as Pavel Trofimovich Gradov, Chairman of the USSR Sports Committee (prototype — Sergei Pavlovich Pavlov)
- Viktor Dobronravov as Sergei Maksimov, a KGB officer responsible for the security of Anatoly Karpov's team in Baguio (prototype — Vladimir Pishchenko)
- Viktor Sukhorukov as Viktor Baturinsky, director of the Central Chess Club, head of Anatoly Karpov's team leader
- Diana Pozharskaya as Veronika Karpova, Anatoly Karpov's wife (prototype — Irina Kuimova)

=== Other cast ===
- Fyodor Dobronravov as Anatoly Karpov's father
- Mikhail Teynik as Yuri Balashov, grandmaster, Anatoly Karpov's second
- Anatoly Kot as Igor Zaitsev, grandmaster, Anatoly Karpov's second
- Dmitry Iosifov as Mikhail Tal, Soviet chess player, eighth world champion, consultant to Anatoly Karpov
- Anton Bogdanov as Vasily Brykin, chef, Anatoly Karpov's team
- Dmitry Miller as Sevastyanov, Chairman of the USSR Chess Federation
- Aleksandr Filippenko as General Secretary Leonid Brezhnev
- David Brodsky as Boris Zelenin
- Armen Ananikyan as Tigran Petrosian, Soviet chess player, ninth world champion
- Vladimir Khalturin as Boris Spassky, Soviet chess player, tenth world champion
- Aleksandr Gorelov as Lev Polugaevsky, Soviet chess player
- Pekka Strang as Bobby Fischer, American chess player, eleventh world champion
- Josefin Asplund as Paola, Viktor Korchnoi's cohabitant
- John Warren as Raymond Keene, English chess player, Viktor Korchnoi's second
- Reilly Costigan as Michael Stean, English chess player, Viktor Korchnoi's second
- Pascal Durier as Max Euwe, Dutch chess player and functionary, fifth world champion and FIDE president
- Junsuke Kinoshita as Florencio Campomanes, FIDE Vice President
- Aleksandr Kan as Ferdinand Marcos, President of the Philippines

== Production ==
In 2019, the film was included in the list of 14 film projects that will receive financial support from the Cinema Foundation.

=== Filming ===
Principal photography began in July 2020 and lasted until March 2021, taking place in Spain, Netherlands, Thailand, Philippines, and Moscow, Russia.
