= The Very Best Day =

- Film poster with original title
- Directed by: Zhora Kryzhovnikov
- Written by: Zhora Kryzhovnikov; Alexey Kazakov
- Produced by: Zhora Kryzhovnikov; Timur Bekmambetov; Alexey Kazakov; Sergey Kornikhin
- Starring: Dmitry Nagiev; Olga Seryabkina; Yuliya Aleksandrova
- Cinematography: Maxim Shinkorenko; Ivan Lebedev
- Edited by: Alexander Verkholyak
- Production company: Bazelevs Company
- Release date: December 24, 2015
- Running time: 112 minutes
- Country: Russia
- Language: Russian
- Budget: $2 000 000
- Box office: $10 744 717

The Very Best Day (Russian: Самый лучший день, romanized: Samyy luchshiy den) is a Russian comedy film directed by Zhora Kryzhovnikov. It is the highest-grossing Russian film of 2015, which raised more than $10.5 million at the box office.

== Plot ==
Provincial traffic police officer Petya Vasyutin is about to marry his beloved girlfriend Olya, but succumbs to the allure of a famous pop star Alyona Shyopot. Caught drunk driving, she decides to seduce Petya to avoid punishment. Having lost his fiancée, Vasyutin tries to fix his mistakes and get his life back on track.

== Cast ==
- Dmitry Nagiev as Petya Vasyutin, a traffic police officer
- Olga Seryabkina as Alina Shyopot, a famous pop singer
- Yuliya Aleksandrova as Olya, Petya's girlfriend
- Sergey Lavygin as Valentin, Petya's best friend
- Valentina Mazunina as Anzhela, Olya's friends and Valentin's wife
- Inna Churikova as Lyubov, Petya's mother
- Mikhail Boyarsky as Gennady, Petya's father
- Elena Yakovleva as Tatyana, Olya's mother
- Vladislav Vetrov as Vikenty Mikhailovich, Tatyana's groom
- Yan Tsapnik as the traffic police chief
- Andrey Malakhov (cameo appearance) as himself

== Awards and nominations ==
Golden Eagle Awards 2017

- Elena Yakovleva — Best Supporting Actress (won)

Nika Awards 2017

- Mikhail Boyarsky — Best Supporting Actor (nominated)
