= Valeriy Pecheykin =

Russian playwright (born 1984)

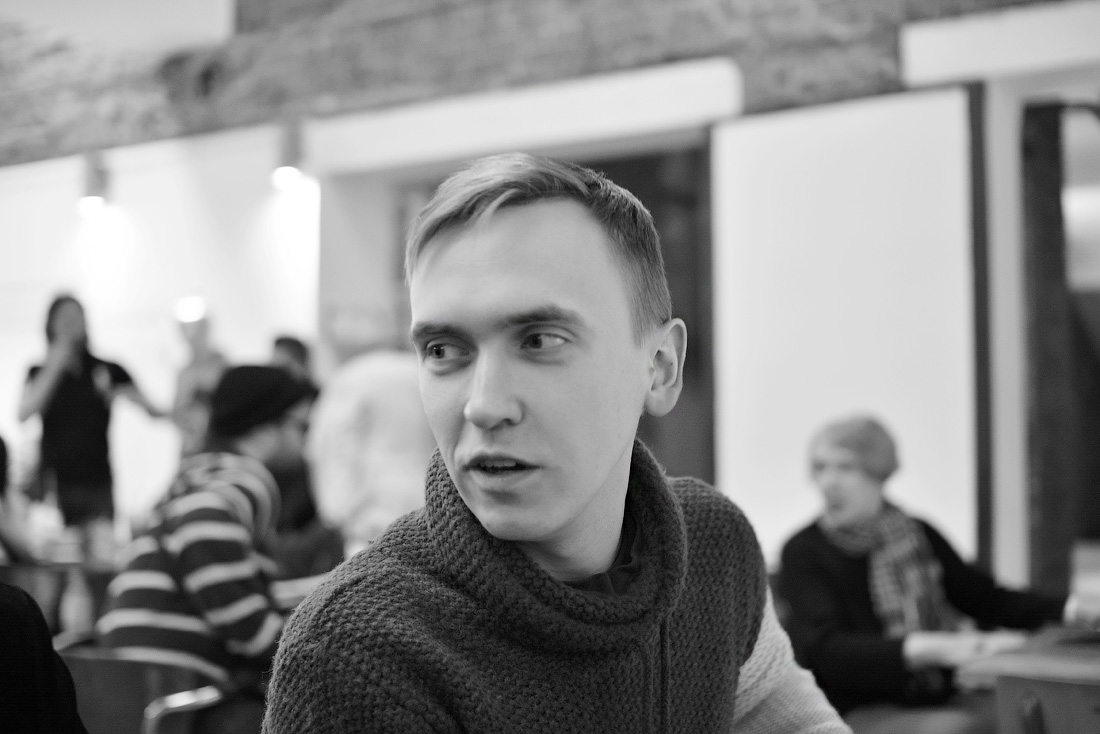
- Born: Tashkent
- Education: Tashkent State University of Economics; Gorky Literary Institute
- Occupation: Dramatist
- Writing career
- Period: 2005–present
- Notable works: A Little Hero; Net; Falcons
- Notable awards: Debut and New Drama(2005)

Valeriy Pecheykin (Russian: Валéрий Валéрьевич Печéйкин) is a Russian playwright, dramaturge, and journalist.

== Early life and education ==
Pecheykin was born in 1984 in Tashkent, Uzbekistan.

After graduating from Tashkent State University of Economics and working as a journalist in Tashkent, he studied creative writing at Gorky Literary Institute in Moscow.

== Career ==
Pecheykin is the author of the plays My Moscow (2008), Net (2009), Lucifer (2008), Russia, Forward! (2011), A Little Hero (2014) and co-wrote the screenplay for Pavel Lungin's film The Conductor (Russia, 2012). A collection of his plays was published in Russia under the title Lucifer in 2013. Dear Lord (2014) is a play for children and premiered in December 2014 directed by Denis Azarov. Pecheykin's play Falcons (2005) received two young playwright awards, Debut and New Drama.

A Little Hero was published in Russian in Mitin Journal (Митин журнал) in 2014. The play's main character, an underage boy named Vovochka (a nickname that means 'little Vladimir'), takes the Russian anti-gay-propaganda law into his own hands, organizing a vigilante group "Crematorium" that persecutes gay men and women under the pretext of protecting the children. He feels a close affinity with Vladimir Putin and even appeals to him with a proposal to build a giant cremation machine he invented for incinerating all kinds of sexual "deviants." The storyline seems at first like a dystopian fantasy; however, it offers a realistic portrayal of contemporary life in Russia for homosexuals. It was translated into English by Zhenya Pomerantsev and John Turiano and staged in its abridged version under the title Crematorium at New York's Shelter Studios and Gene Frankel Theatre, directed by Alexander Kargaltsev, after a workshop at Dixon Place. The full play in translation was staged at London's White Bear Theatre in 2018. In 2020 with Visual Artist Ilya Shagalov made digital experiment "Kleines Requiem" especially for Radar OST Digital in Deutsches Theater

As of 2020 he worked as a writer and dramaturge at Gogol Center in Moscow. He is a regular contributor for the Russian LGBT magazine Kvir.

== Plays ==
- 2005 — Falcons (Соколы)
- 2008 — My Moscow (Моя Москва), Lucifer (Люцифер)
- 2009 — Net
- 2011 — Russia, Forward! (Россия, вперёд!)
- 2014 — A Little Hero (Маленький герой), Dear Lord (Боженька), Nine (Девять)

== Screenplays ==
- 2012 — The Conductor (Дирежёр) (with Pavel Lungin)
- 2014 — Heart Defect (Порок сердца) (video short)
- 2016 — The Queen of Spades (with Pavel Lungin)

== Books ==
- 2013 — Lucifer (Люцифер)
- 2020 — Evil boy (Злой мальчик)
