= The Queen of Spades (2016 film) =

Queen of Spades
- Directed by: Pavel Lungin
- Written by: Pavel Lungin; Valeriy Pecheykin; Steven Walsh; Aleksandr Lungin
- Produced by: Pavel Lungin; Dmitri Rudovsky; Fyodor Bondarchuk; Yevgeny Panfilov
- Starring: Kseniya Rappoport; Ivan Yankovsky
- Cinematography: Levan Kapanadze
- Edited by: Carolina Machievska
- Production companies: Art Pictures Studio; Pavel Lungin Studio
- Distributed by: 20th Century Fox
- Release date: 17 November 2016
- Running time: 120 minutes
- Country: Russia
- Languages: Russian, Kumyk
- Budget: $3,5 million
- Box office: $502 105

Queen of Spades (Russian: Дама пик, romanized: Dama pik) is a 2016 Russian thriller film directed by Pavel Lungin. The picture is about opera singers preparing for a performance in the Queen of Spades.

== Plot ==
Opera diva Sofia Mayer after many years of emigration returns to Russia. The singer intends to stage Tchaikovsky's Queen of Spades in the opera where she once made her debut. Mayer intends to sing the part of the countess herself, she invites the artistic director of the theater Vsevolod Golovin for the part of Herman, despite his mature age, and gives the part of Lisa to her niece Lisa, who was named in honor of the heroine of Tchaikovsky's opera. Andrei, who is Lisa's boyfriend and singer of the same opera troupe, also dreams of fame and money, but he does not get any role in the new production. He himself is confident that he can sing the part of Herman better than anyone else. Through Lisa, he gets to visit Mayer, who stays at her old friend and patron Oleg's place. Andrei sings for Mayer, but she does not give him any answer.

In the evening, when Oleg, Sofia and Lisa go somewhere, Andrei pursues them and gets into the underground casino of Oleg. He learns that Sophia is a gambler, and has lost almost all of her fortune and even mortgaged her house in Paris. Andrei also wants to play, and the next day he takes all his savings, 47 thousand dollars, and, like Herman, plays the game Faro, placing the bet on number three. He wins. Andrei has a quarrel with Lisa who does not understand his new interest.

Golovin's throat gets sick and he can not sing at rehearsals. He is replaced by Andrei whose singing impresses Mayer. She visits Andrei at home and they become lovers. Mayer comes to an agreement with Golovin that Herman will be sung by Andrei, but Sofia as a member of the jury of a prestigious award will arrange so that Golovin's theatre will receive a gold statuette, which Golovin yet did not have. Andrei again makes a bet in the casino, this time on number seven, and again wins. He wants to place one for a third time and win a million, but for this he needs to borrow more than three hundred thousand dollars. He turns to the Caucasian criminal authority David, uncle of his best best friend Gagik. He is ready to lend money to Andrei if, in the event of a loss he becomes a slave of David.

Lisa comes to Andrei and finds him with Sofia, realizing that they became lovers. At the rehearsal Lisa refuses to sing her part, however, when Sofia begins the part, Lisa returns and sings it, showing a passion and power of voice which she previously lacked.

Shortly before the premiere, Sofia cashes her last check secretly from Oleg and for some reason meets David. Andrei worries that he will not be able to win money before the premiere, but on the day of the premiere they give him the necessary 300 thousand dollars for him. Andrei leaves the rehearsal in the casino and makes a bet on the ace, but loses: instead of an ace, a queen of spades turns out to be on the left. He returns to the theater, the opera begins which takes place with triumph. During the break, Andrei tells Sofia in the dressing room about his loss and asks her to help him, but she says that she no longer has money. Andrei strangles Sofia, not paying attention to her words that he played using her money. After singing the last aria, Andrei breaks a glass and cuts his neck with the sharp edge. Sofia comes to her senses and together with Lisa receives an ovation from the enthusiastic audience.

Andrei is saved but he loses his voice. Since now he is in David's slavery, he is taken to the basement, where people place bets on the lethal game of Russian roulette. After three shots, Andrei remains alive, and his opponent dies. David gives the money which he earned on bets to the unexpectedly materialised Sofia, who then leaves in her white car. Andrei recalls that long ago in his childhood he heard Sofia's voice on the radio and starts to understand that he began to belong to her even then.

== Cast ==
=== Lead actors ===
- Ksenia Rappoport as Sofia Mayer (vocals by Agunda Kulaeva)
- Ivan Yankovsky as Andrei (vocals by Arseniy Yakovlev)
- Maria Kurdenevich as Lisa (vocals by Irina Churilova)
- Vladimir Simonov as Vsevolod Golovin, artistic director of the theater
- Igor Mirkurbanov as Oleg, an opera investor and casino owner
- David Roinishvili as David Georgievich
- Benik Arakelyan as Gagik
- Natalia Kolyakanova as Elvira
- Alexey Kolgan as Stepan
- Dmitry Kulichkov as Alexey
- Yevgeny Zelensky as Baglay
- Roman Kolotukhin as soldier

=== Soloists on stage ===
- Maxim Pasteur as Chekalinsky
- Oleg Tsybulko as Narumov
- Andrey Yakovtsev as Yeletsky
- Sergey Radchenko as Chaplitsky

== Production ==
Initially the film was supposed to be a Russian-American co-production in English and to be set in the USA. David Seidler was to serve as screenwriter and Uma Thurman was to play Sofia.

== Awards ==
- Golden Eagle Award (2017)
  - Best Male Actor (Ivan Yankovsky)
  - Best work of makeup and plastic special effects artist (Elena Fomichova)
