= Gogol Center =

Theatre in Moscow, Russia

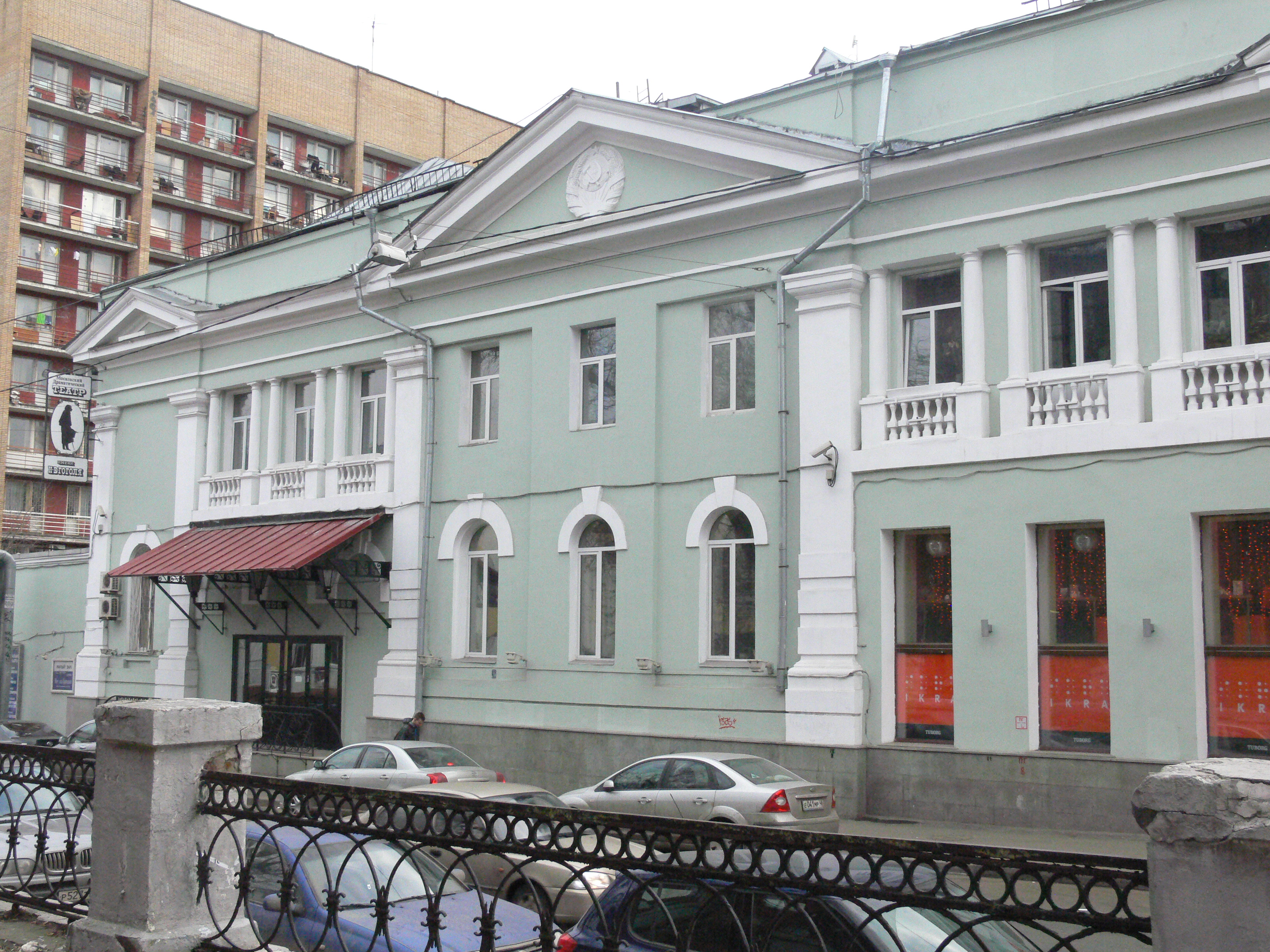
An image of Gogol Center

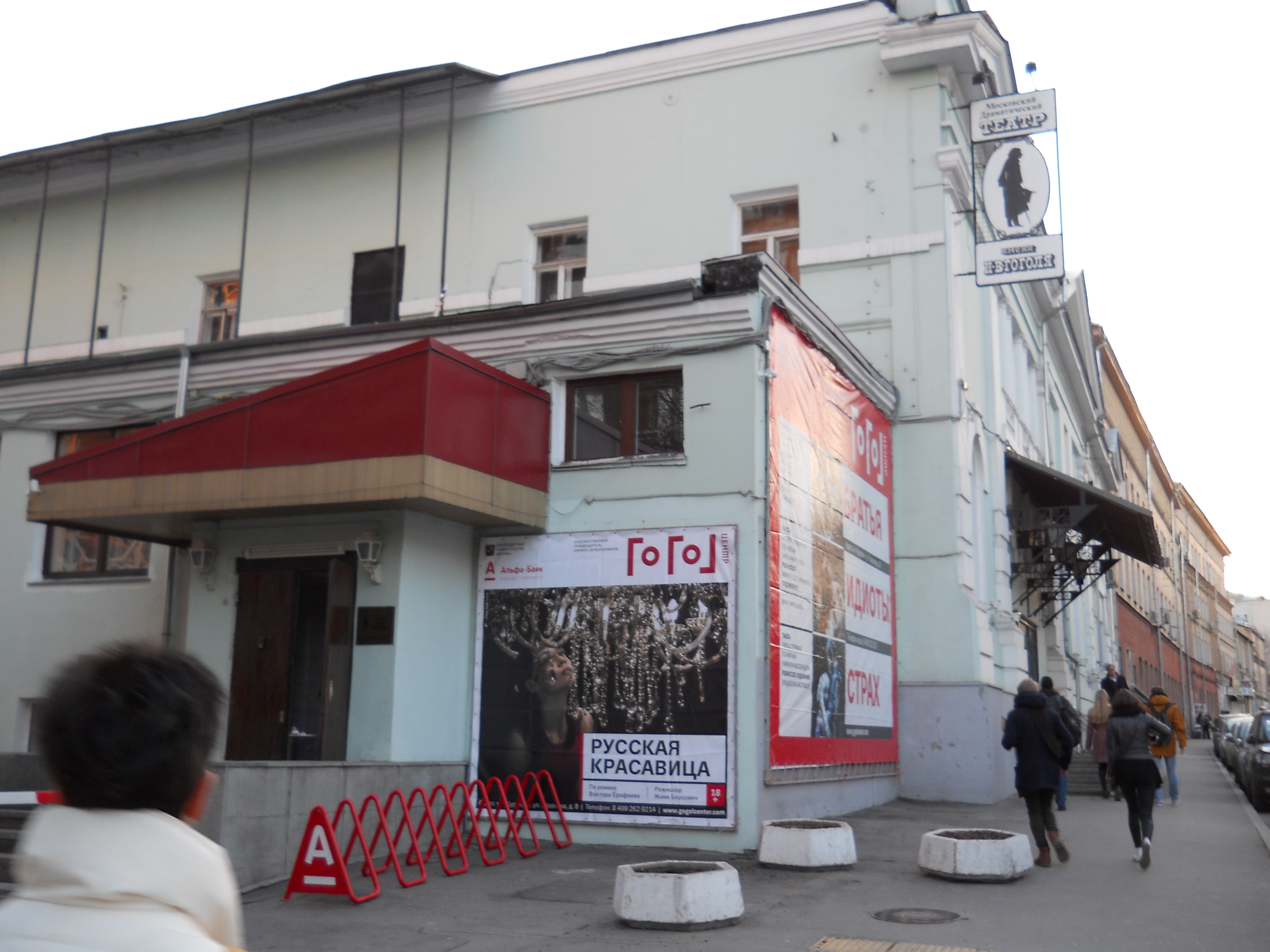
Corner view

The Gogol Center, formerly Gogol Theatre, is a multi-use arts complex in Moscow that was home to Russia's leading avant-garde theater. In June 2022 it was closed down by the Russian Government, along with an announcement that it would be renamed Nikolai Gogol Drama Theatre.

Starting life as a theatre company called Drama and Comedy Theatre in 1925, the theatre has undergone a succession of renamings, including Moscow Theatre of Transport and Central Theatre of Transport, as the company originally served railway workers. It was first named after writer Nikolai Gogol on the 150th anniversary of his birth, in 1935.

The building is located at 8A Kazakova Street, Moscow.

== Early history ==
The Drama and Comedy Theatre, a theatre company, was founded in 1925 with the intention of serving railway workers, and managed by K. Golovanov.

In 1930, it was passed to government control, under an administrative unit for Literature and Art Affairs (Glaviskusstvo) at the RSFSR Ministry of Education (Narkompros). In 1931, it came under Central Committee of the Rail Union, and renamed the Moscow Theatre of Transport at the Central Committee of Railroad. In 1934, the art direction of the theatre came under the auspices of the Moscow Art Theatre No. 2.

In April 1935, the theatre was named after Nikolai Gogol, on the 150th anniversary of the writer's birth.

In 1939, the it was once again renamed, to Central Theatre of Transport, under the directorship of I. Petrov, a People's Artist of the RSFSR.

From 1941 to 1943, the theatre company toured to the Transbaikal region and Mongolia, and in 1943, moved into the building at 8A Kazakova Street.

Directors in the post-war period included:

- 1948: Ilya Sudakov
- 1953: V. Goldfeld, Honoured Art Worker of the RSFSR
- 1958: P. Vasiliev, Honoured Art Worker of the RSFSR
- 1961: A. Dunayev, Honoured Art Worker of the RSFSR.
- 1965: B. Golubovsky, People's Artist of the RSFSR
- 1987: S. Yashin, People's Artist of the Russian Federation

== Gogol Center ==
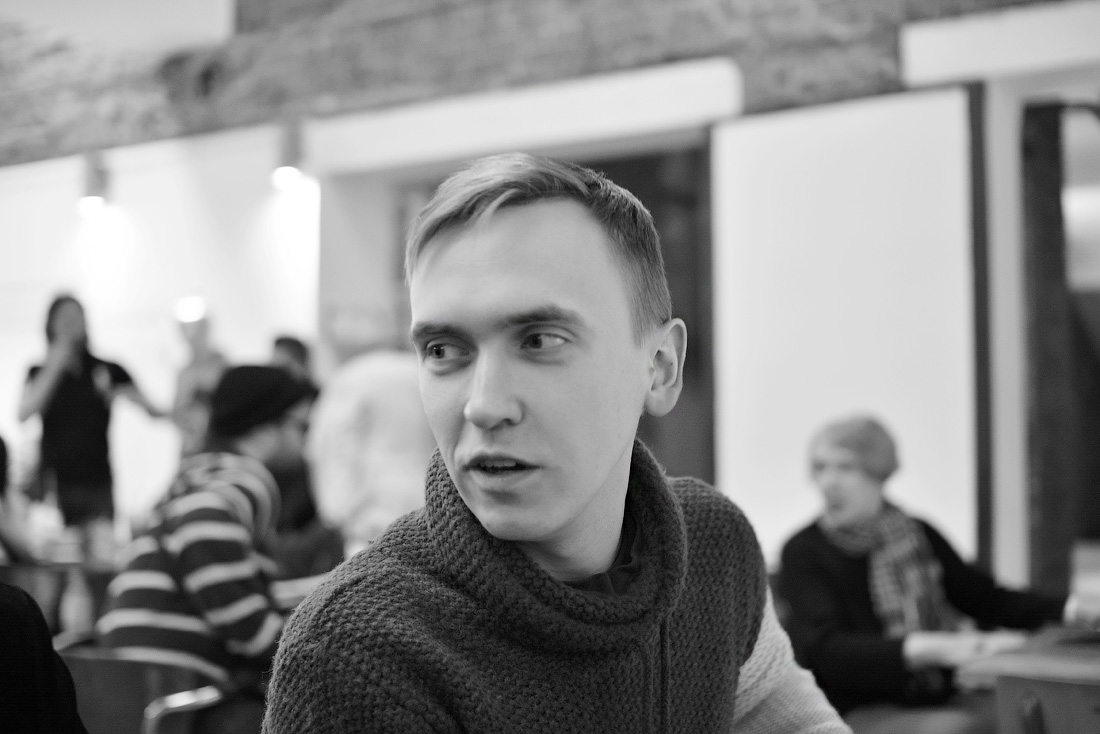
Valeriy Pecheykin

In February 2013, Moscow's Gogol Theatre reopened as the Gogol Center with a season that included performances of Dead Souls by Nikolai Gogol and Hamlet by William Shakespeare.

The center featured movies, music concerts, a discussion club, and performances by Russian and foreign directors on several stages. It was noted for its stagings of contemporary Russian dramas and a lobby featuring neon-lit mirrors shaped like famous directors. Openly gay playwright Valeriy Pecheykin was a dramaturge at the theatre. It has featured in news related to Russian state censorship of the arts.

The center has hosted dance companies, including SounDrama and Studio Seven, as part of an experimental artist in residence program specifically committed to art that "does not limit itself with any genre boundaries and constantly strives to reflect Modern Art in the most relevant way."

In May 2017, the Investigative Committee of Russia ordered police to raid the center. The center's Director, Kirill Serebrennikov, was detained for questioning. On 23 May, police attributed the cause of the raid and detention of its director to an investigation of embezzlement of budget funds. In 2021, Serebrennikov was fired as director of the centre, part of a government crackdown following the 2021 Russian protests in support of Alexei Navalny. Michael Idov characterizes the embezzlement accusation as a false charge used to justify closure of a hub for free expression.

== 2022 closure ==
In June 2022, the Moscow Department of Culture announced that it would be ending the contracts of the centre's director Alexei Kabeshev and artistic director Alexey Agranovich, further announcing that the centre would be renamed as the Nikolai Gogol Drama Theatre.

On 30 June 2022, the centre held its last performance as the Gogol Center, titled I Don't Take Part In War after a verse from a poem by Yuri Levitansky. At the end of the performance, Agranovich told the audience that "The Gogol Centre is closed. Forever." Serebrennikov accused the Russian government of targeting the centre for its "attempt at freedom" and its opposition to the 2022 Russian invasion of Ukraine.
