= Call DiCaprio! =

2018 Russian TV series or program

- Genre: Drama; Comedy; Satire
- Written by: Zhora Kryzhovnikov; Pyotr Vnukov; Evgeniya Khripkova; Aleksey Karaulov; Vladislava Amangeldyeva
- Directed by: Zhora Kryzhovnikov
- Starring: Alexander Petrov; Andrey Burkovsky; Yuliya Aleksandrova; Anna Nevskaya; Yuliya Khlynina; Alexandra Revenko; Anton Vasilyev
- Country of origin: Russia
- Original language: Russian
- No. of seasons: 1
- No. of episodes: 8

Production
- Executive producers: Olga Dolmatovskaya; Yuliya Timofeeva
- Producers: Anton Shchukin; Artyom Loginov; Anton Zaytsev; Alexander Dulerain
- Cinematography: Kseniya Sereda; Ivan Lebedev; Mikhail Yakovlev
- Running time: 41–49 minutes
- Production company: Good Story Media

Original release
- Network: Premier; TNT
- Release: 20 October – 1 December 2018

Call DiCaprio! is a Russian drama television series with elements of satire directed and co-written by Zhora Kryzhovnikov. The story follows two brothers: a popular, self-centered actor Yegor (Alexander Petrov), who discovers he has HIV, and his unlucky, unemployed brother Lev (Andrey Burkovsky), who gets the chance to replace Yegor in a popular TV series.

The series won the Russian Association of Film and Television Producers award for "Best TV Mini-Series", the "White Elephant" award for "Young Film Critics Voice", and the "Movement" film festival awards for Best Screenplay and Best Actor Duo (Alexander Petrov and Andrey Burkovsky). It was twice nominated for the Golden Eagle Awards (2020) for "Best TV Film or Mini-Series" and "Best Male TV Role" (Alexander Petrov).

The premiere was on 20 October 2018 on the streaming platform Premier, with the final episode released on 1 December 2018, coinciding with World AIDS Day. On TNT, it aired from 6 to 16 April 2020.

== Plot ==
Yegor Rumyantsev is the star of a hit but formulaic medical drama "First City Hospital". He becomes egotistical, neglecting the feelings of others, missing shoots, using women, and deceiving those around him. Everything changes when Yegor discovers he has HIV.

His half-brother Lev is an unlucky actor who hosts a craft show on a cable channel "Muravey-TV". At home, Lev's pregnant wife and two young daughters await him. Without career prospects, Lev suddenly gets a chance to replace Yegor in the popular medical series.

== Cast ==
- Alexander Petrov — Yegor Rumyantsev
- Andrey Burkovsky — Lev Ivanovsky, Yegor's brother
- Yuliya Aleksandrova — Marina Ivanovskaya, Lev's wife
- Anna Nevskaya — Ekaterina Zolotova, Yegor's girlfriend
- Yuliya Khlynina — Dasha, Yegor's girlfriend
- Alexandra Revenko — Polina, Vasya's fiancée
- Anton Vasilyev — Vasya, friend of Yegor, Lev, and Marina
- Vitalia Kornienko — Aglaya, Lev and Marina's daughter
- Marta Timofeeva — Vasilisa, Lev and Marina's daughter
- Yana Koshkina — Yana, Polina's friend
- Darya Feklenko — Lyubov Georgievna, Dasha's mother
- Sergey Lavygin — Sergey, actor in the series
- Alexandra Vlasova — Sveta Lozhkina, actress in the series
- Pavel Vorozhtsov — Pyotr, series screenwriter
- Anna Begunova — Begunova, actress in the series
- Natalia Potapova — doctor in AIDS center
- Artyom Semakin — Artem, series director
- Anna Khilkevich — Anya, Yegor's ex-wife
- Dmitry Mukhamadeev — security guard at medical center
- Ravshana Kurkova — Roksana Kurkina, actress

== Themes ==
The series satirizes modern Russian cinema and television. Its characters star in a deliberately low-quality medical drama. It addresses the taboo topic of HIV in Russia and social stigmas against people with HIV. It also mocks homophobia.

== Production ==
The title originates from a joke by actor Dmitry Nagiyev about calling a famous actor if a take fails. Kryzhovnikov began writing the script in March 2016. Filming began in July 2017, and editing took six months. Alexander Petrov did not know the full script during shooting, making each day a surprise.

== Reception ==
The series received highly positive reviews. Russian critics named it the best Russian series of 2018.

== Awards and nominations ==
=== Awards ===
- 2018 — "Movement" Film Festival: Best Screenplay, Jury Special Mention for Best Actor Duo (Alexander Petrov & Andrey Burkovsky)
- 2018 — The Hollywood Reporter Russia: Breakthrough of the Year (Zhora Kryzhovnikov), Actress of the Year (Yuliya Aleksandrova)
- 2019 — White Elephant: Young Film Critics Voice
- 2019 — Association of Film and Television Producers: Best TV Mini-Series

=== Nominations ===
- 2020 — Golden Eagle: Best TV Film or Mini-Series, Best Male TV Role (Alexander Petrov)
