= House Arrest (2021 film) =

2021 film

- Directed by: Aleksey German Jr.
- Starring: Merab Ninidze; Anna Mikhalkova; Roza Khairullina; Anastasiya Melnikova; Svetlana Khodchenkova; Aleksandr Pal
- Cinematography: Ivan Burlakov
- Production companies: Outrageous Film Company; LM Media; MetraFilms; All Media A Start Company; Kinoprime Foundation; START Studio
- Release date: 9 July 2021 (Cannes)
- Running time: 106 minutes
- Country: Russia
- Language: Russian

House Arrest is a 2021 Russian comedy drama film directed by Aleksey German Jr. In June 2021, the film was selected to compete in the Un Certain Regard section at the 2021 Cannes Film Festival.

== Plot ==
The film follows David (Merab Ninidze), a university professor at a provincial Russian campus, who starts a social media campaign to expose local mayoral corruption. His efforts lead to unintended consequences, as he is placed under house arrest and faces false embezzlement charges. Confined to his cluttered apartment, David grapples with the isolation and mounting pressure of his circumstances, exacerbated by the lack of support from colleagues and hostility from neighbors. His relationship with his critical, chain-smoking mother (Roza Khairullina) provides both solace and tension. As David's situation deteriorates and his water supply is cut off, he faces the harsh realities of holding onto his principles in a repressive society.

== Cast ==
- Merab Ninidze as David
- Anna Mikhalkova as Anna, a lawyer
- Roza Khairullina as Svetlana Valeryevna, David's mother
- Anastasiya Melnikova as Katya, ex-wife
- Svetlana Khodchenkova as Nadya, a nurse
- Aleksandr Pal as an investigator
- Aleksandra Bortich as Ira

== Reception ==
Wendy Ide of Screen Daily wrote "The film has a charismatic and textured central character who widens the scope of a picture which rarely strays beyond the confines of a cluttered, claustrophobic apartment".
