= Kiss Them All! =

- Directed by: Zhora Kryzhovnikov
- Produced by: Timur Bekmambetov; Ilya Burets; Dmitry Nelidov; Sergey Svetlakov
- Starring: Yuliya Aleksandrova; Egor Koreshkov; Yan Tsapnik; Sergey Svetlakov; Aleksandr Pal
- Cinematography: Dmitry Gribanov
- Production companies: Bazelevs Production; Lunapark Film Company
- Release date: 24 October 2013 (Russia)
- Country: Russia
- Language: Russian
- Budget: 1.5 million $
- Box office: 27.3 million $

Kiss Them All! (Russian: Горько!, romanized: Gorko!) is a 2013 Russian film directed by Zhora Kryzhovnikov and produced by Timur Bekmambetov, Ilya Burets, Dmitry Nelidov, and Sergey Svetlakov. The movie is a wedding comedy. The protagonists, Natasha and Roma, are progressive and talented and dream to organize their wedding by the sea, while Natasha's stepfather Boris Ivanovich wants a classic Russian wedding in a restaurant.

== Plot ==
Natasha and Roma plan to hold their wedding by the sea in Europe. However, Natasha's stepfather, the town manager, wants to use the event to advance his own political careers and arranges an event of his own.

== Cast ==
- Yuliya Aleksandrova as Natasha, the bride, a gas company employee
- Egor Koreshkov as Roma, the groom, a journalist of the local newspaper
- Yan Tsapnik as Boris, Natasha's stepfather, a town manager and former Blue Beret
- Yelena Valyushkina as Tatyana, Natasha's mother, a housewife
- Yuliya Sules as Lyuba, Roma's mother, a hairdresser
- Vasily Kortukov as Evgeny, Roma's father, a fishing lures maker
- Aleksandr Pal as "Khipar" (Alexey), Roma's brother who just got out of jail
- Sergey Svetlakov as the star master of ceremonies (cameo)
- Valentina Mazunina as Ksyukha, Khipar's girlfriend
- Danila Yakushev as Semyon, Natasha's boss
- Sergey Lavygin as Uncle Tolya, Roma's relative from Tuapse
- Sergey Gabrielyan Jr. as Dima, brother to Roma and Khipar who has been recording the wedding on his camera
- Anastasia Dobakhova as Lyuda, the bridesmaid
- Mikhail Grubov as Sanya, the groomsman
- Evgenia Agenorova as Roma's grandmother

== Reception ==
Kiss them All is the most profitable domestic film in the history of Russian box office, having managed to earn more than 27.3 million dollars on a budget of 1.5 million $.

The film received mainly positive reviews and reception from critics. Russia Beyond the Headlines wrote in the review— "Russian viewers were offended but laughed, and critics loved it." However, it got a huge negative backlash from viewers. Peak of negativity was after popular Russian YouTube blogger BadComedian made a negative review of this film.

== Sequel ==
The film was followed by Kiss Them All! 2, which became the most profitable film of 2014 in Russia.

== Remake ==
A Mexican remake of the film was released in 2018 and was named «Hasta que la boda nos separe» («Until the wedding breaks us apart»). In Russia it's known as «Kiss Them All in Mexico» (Russian: Горько в Мексике).
