= The Boy's Word: Blood on the Asphalt =

Russian crime drama series

- Genre: Crime drama
- Written by: Zhora Kryzhovnikov; Andrey Zolotarev
- Directed by: Zhora Kryzhovnikov
- Starring: Ivan Yankovsky; Ruzil Minekaev; Leon Kemstach; Elizaveta Bazykina; Anna Peresild; Anastasiya Krasovskaya; Sergey Burunov
- No. of seasons: 1
- No. of episodes: 8

Production
- Production location: Yaroslavl
- Production companies: Toomuch Production; NMG Studio

Original release
- Network: Wink; Start
- Release: 9 November – 21 December 2023

The Boy's Word: Blood on the Asphalt (Russian: Слово пацана. Кровь на асфальте, romanized: Slovo patsana. Krov na asfalte) is a 2023 Russian crime drama television series directed by Zhora Kryzhovnikov and written by Kryzhovnikov and Andrey Zolotarev. It is based on the novel The Word of the Boy: Criminal Tatarstan of the 1970s–2010s by Robert Garaev about the Kazan phenomenon. The series gained wide popularity in Russia and other post-Soviet countries. The series broadcast on the NTV channel from 9 November to 21 December 2023.

Kazan, during the final years of the Soviet Union as perestroika reshaped society, crime and gang violence spread through the city streets. Fourteen-year-old Andrey, a music school student, lives with his mother and younger sister but struggles with frequent harassment from local street gangs. Seeking protection, he befriends his former bully, Marat, a member of the gang Universam (lit. Supermarket). In exchange for teaching Marat English and helping him win over violinist Aigul, Andrey learns boxing and petty theft.

Andrey undergoes a brutal initiation to join Universam, becoming part of a world where loyalty to the gang takes precedence over laws and promises. Violence escalates when a fellow member, Yeralash, is killed, triggering a gang war. Marat’s older half-brother, Vova, a hardened veteran of the Afghan War, seizes control of Universam, enforcing discipline and taking revenge after Aigul is assaulted by a rival. However, Marat’s relationship with Aigul causes tension within the gang, and after she dies by suicide, he becomes increasingly disillusioned.

As militsiya crack down on gang activity, Andrey’s home life deteriorates, and Marat secretly collaborates with authorities, leading to mass arrests, including Vova’s. Attempting to flee with his nurse girlfriend, Natasha, Vova is fatally shot by police. Marat, now fully aligned with law enforcement, is left alone with Aigul’s rapist. Meanwhile, Andrey, imprisoned, plays the piano as the remaining gang members sing along, marking the end of an era.

== Cast ==
=== Main ===
- Ivan Yankovsky as Vova "Adidas" Suvorov (Russian: Вова "Адидас" Суворов), leader of the "Universam" gang, Marat’s older brother.
- Ruzil Minekaev as Marat "Adidas Junior" Suvorov (Russian: Марат "Адидас-младший" Суворов), member of the "Universam" gang, Vova’s younger brother.
- Leon Kemstach as Andrey "Palto" Vasilyev (Russian: Андрей "Пальто" Васильев), new member of the "Universam" gang.

=== Supporting ===
==== People around Suvorov brothers ====
- Elizaveta Bazykina as Natasha Rudakova (Russian: Наташа Рудакова), nurse, Vova's girlfriend.
- Anna Peresild as Aigul Akhmerova (Russian: Айгуль Ахмерова), school student, Marat's girlfriend.
- Sergey Burunov as Kirill Suvorov (Russian: Кирилл Суворов), Vova and Marat's father.
- Svetlana Smirnova-Katsagadzhieva as Dilyara (Russian: Диляра), Marat's mother, Vova's stepmother.
- Ildus Abrahmanov as Renat (Russian: Ренат), Aigul's father.
- Ruslana Doronina as Aigul's mother.

==== People around Andrey ====
- Anastasiya Krasovskaya as Irina Sergeevna (Russian: Ирина Сергеевна), juvenile inspector, Andrey's love interest.
- Yuliya Aleksandrova as Svetlana Mikhailovna (Russian: Светлана Михайловна), Andrey's mother.
- Varvara Kuprina as Yulia (Russian: Юля), Andrey's younger sister.
- Grigory Dudnik as Iskander (Russian: Искандер), Andrey's former friend, a member of the "Razyezd" gang.

=== Others ===
- Anton Vasilyev as Ildar Yunusovich (Russian: Ильдар Юнусович), militsiya leading investigator.
- Nikita Kologrivyy as "Kashchei" (Russian: Кащей), former leader of the "Universam" gang.
- Lev Zulkarnaev as Vakhit "Zima" Zimaletdinov (Russian: Вахит "Зима" Зималетдинов), one of the "supers" of the "Universam" gang.
- Slava Kopeykin as Valera "Turbo" Turkin (Russian: Валера "Турбо" Туркин), one of the "supers" of the "Universam" gang.
- Ivan Makarevich as "John" (Russian: Джон), lead singer of a musical group.
- Alexander Samoylenko Jr. as Denis Konevich (Russian: Денис Коневич), head of the operational Komsomol detachment of vigilantes.
- Nikita Manets as Kirill (Russian: Кирилл), former member of the "Universam" gang.
- Yaroslav Mogilnikov as Misha "Yeralash" Tilkin (Russian: Миша "Ералаш" Тилькин), member of the "Universam" gang.
- Albert Tavabilov as Albert "Lampa" Salikhov (Russian: Альберт "Лампа" Салихов), member of the "Universam" gang.
- Andrey Maksimov as "Zhyoltyy" (Russian: Жёлтый), leader of the "Dom Byta" gang.
- Vladimir Vinogradov as a video salon owner.
- Natalia Potapova as Flyura Gabdulovna (Russian: Флюра Габдуловна), English teacher and deputy principal of the school.
- Olga Lapshina as Nina, Natasha's aunt and Zhyoltyy's mother.
- Lydia Ilyina as Polina Filippovna (Russian: Полина Филипповна), Yeralash's grandmother.

== Episodes ==
No.	Title	Original release date
1	"Episode 1"	9 November 2023
In late winter 1989 in Kazan, 14-year-old Andrey lives with his mother and younger sister. At school, Andrey is told that he will help a classmate named Marat, someone who frequently bullies Andrey, get better at English. Marat, a member of a gang called the Supermarket ("Universam"), becomes friends with Andrey: Andrey teaches him English, and Marat teaches Andrey boxing and petty theft. As Andrey isn’t part of the Supermarket, Marat cannot defend him against rival gangs, himself struggling against the Supermarket’s leader Kashchei. Andrey decides to join the Supermarket gang and withstands a fight against Marat to join. With Andrey’s help, Marat asks out violinist Aigul who goes to Andrey’s school. Marat teaches Andrey about the gang history in Kazan. Andrey sells his father’s watch to go on a trip with the gang to Moscow; in Moscow, they get up to various shenanigans before Marat brutally beats a punk anarchist in an alley. Thinking the punk is dead, Andrey is tricked and arrested, where he is interrogated by a young officer, Irina Sergeevna, who offers Andrey an option to give up the other gang members. He refuses and instead invites Irina to the cinema, being greeted and cheered on by the gang as he exits the police station.
2	"Episode 2"	9 November 2023
With Marat’s help, Andrey buzzes his head. While waiting for Aigul, Marat and Andrey are confronted by Irina, who goes with Andrey to the cinema. Before the film, a documentary about Kazan youth organized crime groups is unexpectedly shown, after which Irina asks Andrey to come up on the stage for an interview; offended, Andrey runs away. Marat gets closer to Aigul. Kashchei scams Andrey’s mother out of 100 rubles and a hat before being tricked by Marat to stop, as he recognized her; her boyfriend, a police officer named Ildar, invites Andrey to the police station and helps him, although he wants Andrey to tell him about the gang members. Marat's older brother, Vova "Adidas", returns from Afghanistan. Vova is not satisfied with the order that has changed in two years and a circle of close associates immediately forms around him. As a result of a scam run by Vova, Andrey attempts to gaslight his mother into believing that she never lost her money but she doesn’t believe him. At a disco that evening, several gangs dance in peace but Andrey provokes a mass brawl in front of Irina, who had invited him there. Meanwhile, two members of the Supermarket named Kirill and Yeralash are confronted by a rival gang and Kirill leaves Yeralash behind, causing the gang members to brutally beat him in the streets. At the police station, Ildar teaches Andrey a lesson about violence by beating him with a brick in a boot in a bathroom stall.
3	"Episode 3"	16 November 2023
The boys present Andrey's mother with a hat which Marat had previously stolen from English teacher Flyura Gabdulovna. Kirill cuts open his head with a glass bottle and tells a fictional version of what happened, lying to the Supermarket that he tried to fight the attackers. The boys find out that in the attack, Yeralash was beaten to death, and on a false tip from Kirill, Vova leads the Supermarket in an attack on a rival gang. The leaders visit Kashchei for explanations and the boys violently beat Kirill, banning him from joining gangs. At Yeralash’s funeral, the Supermarket vows revenge. Ildar tries to befriend Andrey and tells him that the gang Hadi Taktash is responsible. Flyura informs Marat's parents that he stole the hat; Marat's father kidnaps him and tries to take him to his aunt, but Marat escapes. Led by Vova, the Supermarket gang attacks the Hadi Taktash, with Vova being stabbed in the leg during the fight by a broken board. Andrey and many others are taken to a hospital, where he finds out that Yeralash’s killer, Ravil, is also in the hospital; Andrey finds his room and brutally beats Ravil in his hospital bed.
4	"Episode 4"	23 November 2023
Members of Hadi Taktash break into the hospital and Marat and Andrey are forced to kidnap Vova during his operation on his leg to escape. Vova supports Andrey's act of violence and announces a meeting tomorrow. His mother tries to get Andrey into a school after he is kicked out of musical school, but Andrey purposefully botches the interview, although he lies to his mother that he entered. Aigul berates Marat for treating her like an object. Vova questions Kaschei’s leadership and overthrows him, beating him with the aid of the Supermarket members and stealing money and a revolver from Kaschei’s safe. With the money, the boys decide to start a business by making a video store using cassettes they steal from a man. Ildar warns Andrey that if Ravil dies from his wounds, Andrey will be in danger. Marat discretely returns home to get his things, but his father is waiting for him and allows him to stay. Andrey's mother visits the office of the head teacher, Flyura Gabdulovna, who discovers her stolen hat on her. When Andrey and his sister Julia return home, their mother sets her hair on fire using the stove and subsequently ends up in a psychiatric hospital with psychosis.
5	"Episode 5"	30 November 2023
Ravil survives the beating. Vova falls in love with nurse Natasha, who saved his life during the raid on the hospital. Marat asks Aigul to help with the advertisements for the video store, introduces her to the rest of the guys, and asks her to take care of the cash register; the two enter a relationship. In the evening, a neighboring gang arrives at the store: they kidnap Aigul, who does not give away the video recorder, and the entire cash register. The head of the gang, Yellow ("Zholtiy"), explains to her that the Supermarket stole this video recorder from the person their gang was protecting. Vova arranges a meeting with Yellow as a negotiation and leaves Marat at home, but he joins his brother anyway; Vova, Marat, and Vova’s second-in-command Winter ("Zima") are ambushed and brutally attacked. On Yellow’s orders, a gang member partially cuts off Marat’s ear until Vova apologizes. At the gang’s hideout, Aigul is harassed by a member who had earlier stalked her, who proceeds to sexually assault her; when Yellow returns, he violently beats him for what he has done. A badly wounded Marat accuses his brother of apologizing, something which their gang doesn’t do. Vova arms himself with a hidden revolver and goes to the hideout, where Yellow admits guilt for the incident with Aigul, and says he wants bygones to be bygones. In response, Vova shoots all members present including Yellow in the legs, stepping on Yellow’s wound until he apologizes, after which Vova shoots and kills him; a bloodied Vova takes Aigul with him.
6	"Episode 6"	7 December 2023
Marat takes Aigul to her parents. While Marat's wound is being stitched up in the hospital, Vova invites Natasha on a date; Ildar and the police discover Yellow’s corpse. Vova tells Marat about Aigul's rape and warns that if Marat continues to communicate with Aigul, then according to the rules of the group, he will be kicked out. Marat runs to Aigul and she lies that nothing happened. Vova teaches the group discipline after what happened the previous night; during this montage, flashes are briefly shown during which the audience is told how each gang member will die. Andrey asks Ildar to pick up his mother from a psychiatric hospital; Ildar stays with them and helps with the housework. Andrei learns from Ildar that Vova is wanted for the murder of Yellow. At the disco, Marat is purposefully distracted by Winter as fellow gang member Turbo spreads news of Aigul’s assault through the dancefloor, making her ostracized by her friends. Andrey runs from home after Ildar discovers he warned Vova about a raid on his parents’ home; he goes to Irina but is beaten in the stairwell by her friend John. In the morning, Marat continues to try to get in touch with Aigul; meanwhile, hated by her friends and parents alike, Aigul goes to her balcony and stands on the windowsill.
7	"Episode 7"	14 December 2023
Vova and Natasha continue dating. He spends the night at her dorm and is told by Andrey the next morning that Aigul has committed suicide by jumping from her window. Adidas picks Marat up from school and takes him to the cemetery, where they get drunk; after bringing Marat home, he shouts that Aigul is dead, but Marat no longer hears him. Andrey and the boys ambush John in the entrance and beat him, after which Andrey demands that he stop caring for Irina. Vova tells Natasha that he defended the honor of a woman by standing up for his brother's girlfriend, and is now on the run; he offers to go with her to Abkhazia, where Natasha’s aunt lives. When they arrive there, they find her aunt mourning her son, revealed to be Yellow. The next morning, Marat comes to school and learns about Aigul's death. At Yellow's funeral, one of the gang members recognizes Adidas and attacks him; realizing that Adidas is the murderer of her cousin, Natasha breaks up with him. Andrey's mother returns home, having lost Julia in a crazed mental state; Andrey turns to the boys and Irina for help. Irina's colleague. Kira, seeing that Andrei's mother is in an inadequate condition, calls the orderlies from the psychiatric hospital, who take her away again. Julia is eventually returned. Vova quits the group and appoints Winter as the leader. Policemen take away Julia to live with a foster family but Andrey manages to escape. Marat is kicked out of the gang and police officers offer him Aigul’s rapist if he works with them. Andrey goes to Marat, who hints that Andrey should not come to the group's base tomorrow. The next day, police officers arrest everyone, including Andrey, as Marat watches, having placed Vova’s revolver which was used to kill Yellow in Turbo’s pocket.
8	"Episode 8"	21 December 2023
After the arrest, Marat comes to Ildar, who shows him Kirill, having worked as an informant, who tells Marat that Vova killed Yellow. Ildar explains to Marat that fingerprints remain not only on the weapon, but also on the casings, so the examination will still determine the real killer. Ildar releases Andrey, but warns him that this is the last time. Marat ostracizes Vova for Aigul’s fate. Andrey comes to Irina to find out where his sister is and finds out that Irina has taken her in; he stays with the two of them. Vova visits Natasha and they decide to run away together. Marat is awarded a prize for his bravery and outside the ceremony, he fights with Andrey; the fight is lengthy and brutal, but Andrey wins. Vova and Natasha flee the city but Vova is invited back for his father’s anniversary dinner. While getting a cake for his mother, Andrey is recognized by the person who was robbed of the videotapes by the boys. Vova and Natasha return and Vova talks to his father, who renounces him; Ildar’s police squad arrives and a shootout ensues. Vova manages to escape and is about to embrace with Natasha when Ildar fatally shoots him in the back. At the station, Marat is presented with Kolik - the rapist of Aigul - and is left alone in a bathroom with him. As Andrey is arrested, Vova, presumably, dies in Natasha’s arms, and Marat violently beats and stomps Kolik in the bathroom stall, with Natasha and Marat screaming as Andrey is silent. Some time later, most of the gang sings in prison to a song played on the piano by a disheveled Andrey.

== Production ==
In December 2023, the scriptwriter of the series, Andrey Zolotarev, said that he had prepared stories for two new seasons of the series.

== Soundtrack ==
Performer / music	Track
Aigel	"Piyala"
Basta	"Na Zare" (Alyans cover)
Viktor Tsoi, Kino	"Khochu peremen"
Willi Tokarev	"In A Noisy Booth"
Vladimir Kuzmin	"Just You and Me"
Yegor Letov, Grazhdanskaya Oborona	"Zoo"
Igor Talkov	"Summer Rain"
Kombinaciya	"Do Not Forget"
Mirage	"New Hero"
Mirage	"Together Again"
Mirage	"Sunny Summer"
Mirage	"I Am Not Kidding"
Mirage	"Music Bound Us"
Stas Namin, Tsvety	"Heroic Strength"
Yuri Shatunov, Laskovyi Mai	"Pink Evening"
Yuri Shatunov, Laskovyi Mai	"Gray Night"
Nautilus Pompilius	"I Want to Be with You"
Forum	"Small Island"
Aleksander Serov	"How to Be"
Kris Kelmi	"Night Rendezvous"
Trio Meridian	"Vocalise"
Solovyova, Ziborov	"Kotylu"

== Accolades ==
The series received several awards and nominations.

Award	Category	Nominee(s)	Result
Russian Guild of Film Critics Awards	White Elephant for Best Series	Zhora Kryzhovnikov	Won
Nika Award	Special Prize of the Council of the Academy	Zhora Kryzhovnikov	Won
APKIT Awards	Best Director	Zhora Kryzhovnikov	Won
APKIT Awards	Best Streaming Series (Over 7 Episodes)	The Boy's Word: Blood on the Asphalt	Won
APKIT Awards	Best Screenplay	Zhora Kryzhovnikov, Andrey Zolotarev, Robert Garaev	Won
APKIT Awards	Best Actor in a TV Movie/Series	Ivan Yankovsky	Nominated
APKIT Awards	Best Actor in a TV Movie/Series	Ruzil Minekaev	Won
APKIT Awards	Best Actor in a TV Movie/Series	Leon Kemstach	Nominated
APKIT Awards	Best Actress in a TV Movie/Series	Anna Peresild	Nominated
APKIT Awards	Best Supporting Actor in a TV Movie/Series	Nikita Kologrivyy	Won
APKIT Awards	Best Supporting Actor in a TV Movie/Series	Sergey Burunov	Nominated
APKIT Awards	Best Supporting Actress in a TV Movie/Series	Yuliya Aleksandrova	Won
APKIT Awards	Best Casting	Anastasiya Bagirova	Won
APKIT Awards	Best Film Editing	Egor Tarasenko	Won
APKIT Awards	Best Production Designer	Denis Bykov	Nominated
APKIT Awards	Best Costume Design	Darya Fomina	Won
APKIT Awards	Best Music in a TV Movie/Series	Evgeniy Ziborov	Nominated
National Web Industry Awards	Best Streaming Series (more than 24 minutes)	The Boy's Word: Blood on the Asphalt	Won
National Web Industry Awards	Best Director in a Streaming Series	Zhora Kryzhovnikov	Won
National Web Industry Awards	Best Actor in a Streaming Series	Ivan Yankovsky	Won
National Web Industry Awards	Best Streaming Series (more than 24 minutes)	The Boy's Word: Blood on the Asphalt	Won
National Web Industry Awards	Best Director in a Streaming Series	Zhora Kryzhovnikov	Won
National Web Industry Awards	Best Actor in a Streaming Series	Ivan Yankovsky	Won
Casting Directors' Guild of Russia	Best Ensemble Cast in a Series	Anastasiya Bagirova	Won
Casting Directors' Guild of Russia	Best Actor	Anton Vasilev	Nominated
Casting Directors' Guild of Russia	Best Actor	Ruzil Minekaev	Nominated
Casting Directors' Guild of Russia	Breakthrough Performer of the Year	Slava Kopeykin	Won

== Critical response ==
=== Domestic ===
Film critic Vasily Stepanov praised the series and wrote: "The author's intensity and expression are captivating; everything that makes Kryzhovnikov's cinema worth loving is present: an uninhibited camera, well-conceived crowd scenes, passionate acting (the casting here is golden)". Critic Zinaida Pronchenko responded negatively to the series: "The main problem of the series is not even the dominance of props – too much melted snow, peeling panel houses (inside of which one finds five-room apartments worthy of academician Keldysh), rusty zaporozhets, muskrat hats, obsessive slang, Yura Shatunov – but a complete lack of any development".

=== International ===
British newspaper The Economist notes "high production values and unflinching drama" in the series. The Economist writes: "The series' grimmer episodes, full of severed ears, rape and murder, make it clear it does not glorify violence".

The show's popularity in both Russia and Ukraine, as well as criticism from the head of Tatarstan, Rustam Minnikhanov, were examined by Reuters Moscow bureau chief Guy Faulconbridge in an article titled "Russians go crazy for street gang TV tragedy set amid Soviet collapse". Faulconbridge wrote that "it has become the most popular series in Russia, bringing in millions of viewers to online platforms, though some officials have demanded it be banned for glorifying criminal gangs and corrupting the youth of modern Russia". Screenwriter Andrey Zolotarev commented: "For me this is a story of retribution and redemption, about how evil always returns evil – that you cannot but redeem evil".

== In culture ==
According to Alexander Nazaryan, the Ukrainian Ministry of Culture and Strategic Communications called the show "hostile propaganda" while not directly mentioning it by name, and said that the show was being "widely [and] illegally" viewed across Ukraine. Alexei Uchitel said that apart from Russia, the show was also popular in Ukraine and amongst the Russian-speaking residents of Los Angeles.
