= House of teacher =

- Дом учителя (Russian)
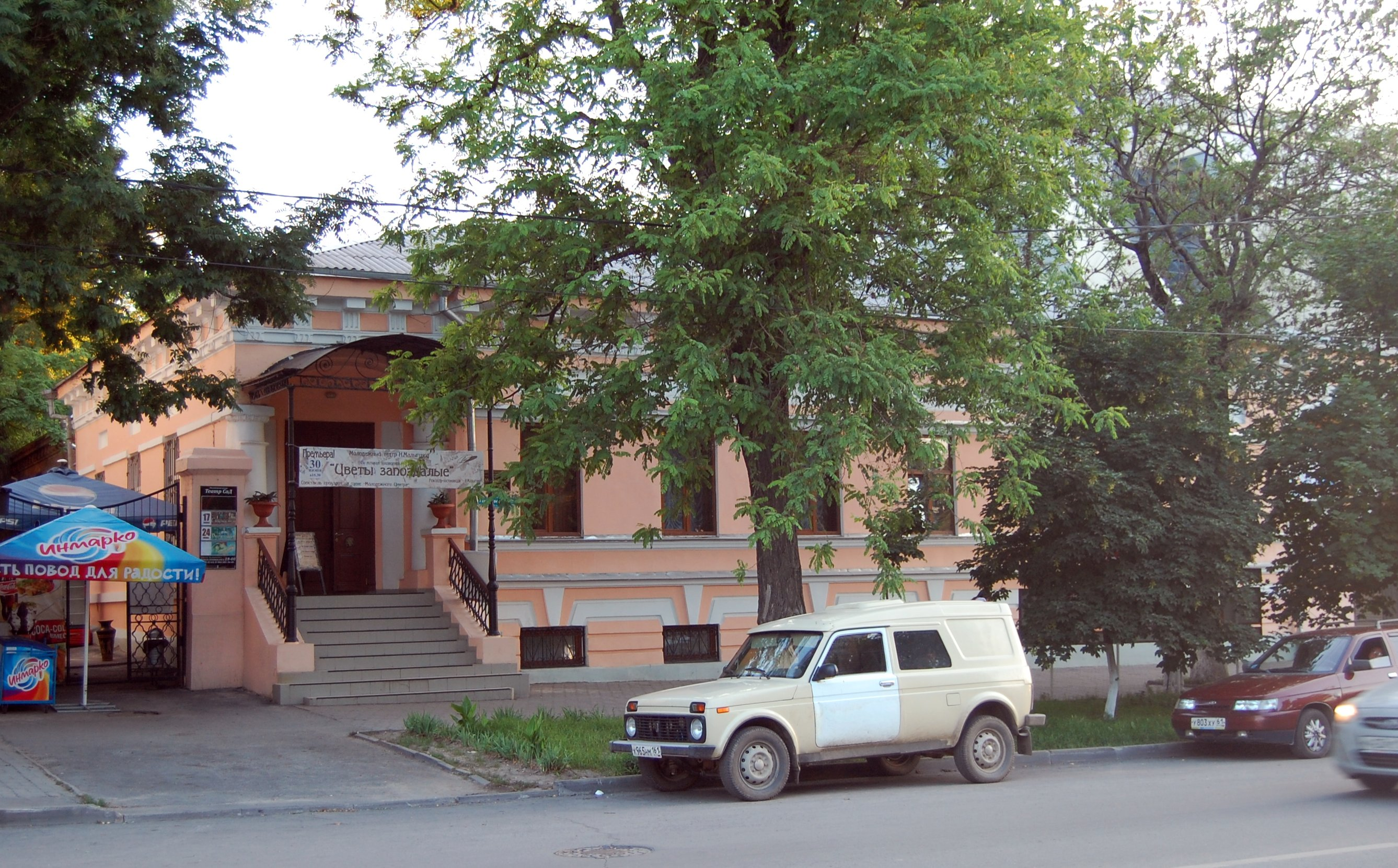
- Interactive map of the House of teacher area

General information
- Location: Taganrog, Petrovskaya St., 89, Rostov Oblast, Russia
- Coordinates: 47°13′03″N 38°55′31″E

The House of Teacher (Russian: Дом учителя) is a mansion in the central part of Taganrog.

== History ==
The ancient mansion on Petrovskaya St. 89 was built at the beginning of the 19th century. In the list of monuments of history and architecture it is registered as the building of Commercial Court.

According to the map of the city of 1863 – in a household "The Commercial Court in the Private House" was placed. After 1912, a private school of the I category resided in the building.

Since December 3, 1943, the House of Pioneers which existed here till February 1944 (it was transferred to the building of Children's music school of P.I. Tchaikovsky) opened. Then in the building, the Teacher's club (The house of workers of education) was arranged.

In 1947 on the basis of the Taganrog Teacher's club, the pianist and the vocalist Ivan Fedorovich Changli-Cha, Ivan created an amateur collective from gifted singers, his pupils: A. Agureev, T. Pocatello, N. Petrova, Zh. Khlebnikova, and others. Actors worked on scenes and arias from operas A.G. Rubenstein's "Demon", "Aida" by G. Verdi, P. I. Tchaikovsky's Mazeppa, and others.

From 1960 until the end of 1980, in the Teacher's Club, there was a folk theater which was managed by B. Potik, then V. Rogulchenko. At the theater, actors such as V. Vetrov, S. Makhovsky, A. Kuleshov, V. Hodgkin, etc. played.

A theatre and film society currently operates out of the mansion
