= Aleksandr Pal =

Russian actor (born 1988)

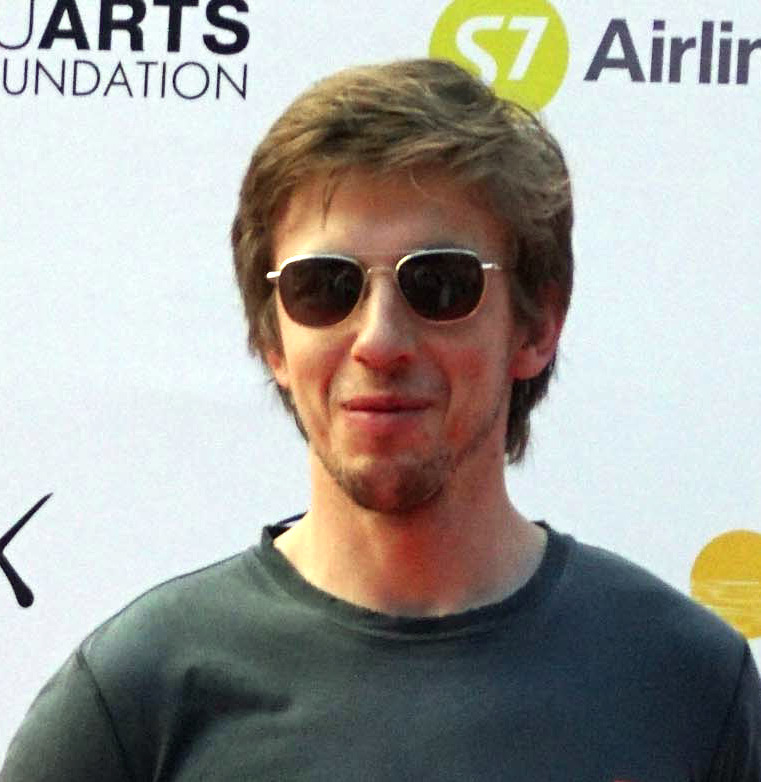
- Pal in 2016
- Born: Aleksandr Vladimirovich Pal; 16 December 1988 (age 37); Chelyabinsk, Russian SFSR, Soviet Union
- Education: Mayakovsky Theatre
- Occupation: Actor
- Years active: 2013-present

Aleksandr Vladimirovich Pal (Russian: Александр Владимирович Паль; born 16 December 1988) is a Russian actor. He has appeared in more than fifteen films since 2013.

== Biography ==
Pal is a descendant of Russian Germans caught up in the Urals as a result of repression. Initially, he did not plan to become an actor. He studied at the GITIS on the course of Leonid Kheifets. He acted in the plays of the Moscow Youth Theater and the Mayakovsky Theater.

== Filmography ==
Year	Title	Role	Notes
2013	Kiss Them All!	Lyokha ("Khipar")	
2014	All at Once	Den	
2014	Yolki 1914	Ivan Filippov	
2015	Without Borders	Sasha Gorelov	
2015	Rag Union	Popov	
2015	Hardcore Henry	Mr. Fahrenheit	
2016	The Icebreaker	Nikolai Kukushkin	
2016	The Good Boy	Stanislav Ilyich	
2017	About Love. For Adults Only	Viktor	
2017	Life Ahead	Gennady	
2017	Raid	Feodor Vachevsky	
2017	Leningrad — Voyage	Bank robber	Music video by the band Leningrad
2017	You All Infuriate Me	Vova / Vladimir	
2019	Fidelity	Sergei	
2020	Deeper!	Roman Petrovich	
2021	Nobody	Teddy Kuznetsov	Yulian’s Younger Brother
2021	House Arrest	the Investigator	
2025	Scenes of Friendly Ties		

== Awards ==
- Sakhalin International Film Festival — Best Actor Award (Rag Union)
- Kinotavr — Best Actor Award (Rag Union)
