= Zhora Kryzhovnikov =

Russian film director, screenwriter and producer

- Жора Крыжовников
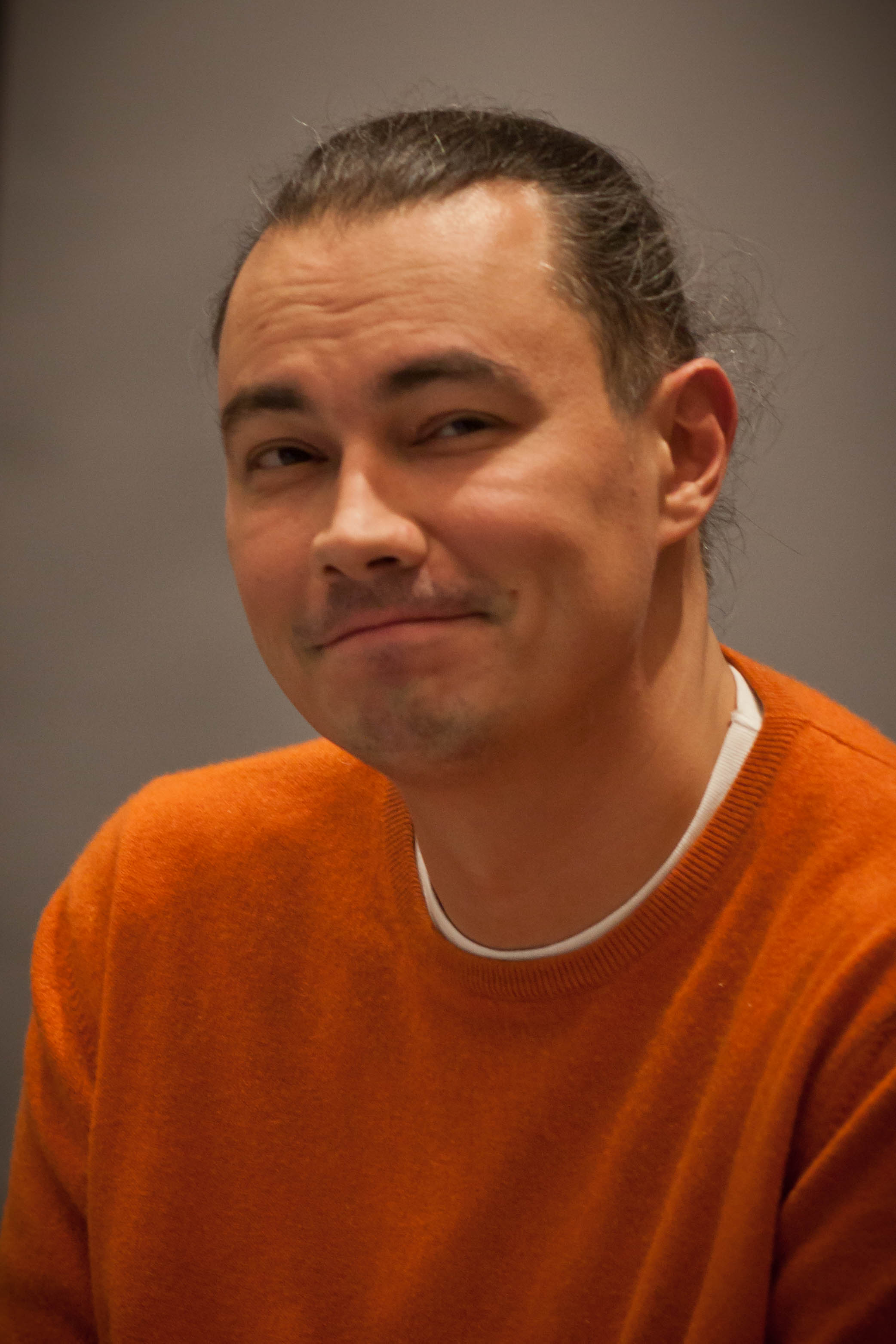
- Born: Andrey Nikolayevich Pershin; 14 February 1979 (age 47); Sarov, Nizhny Novgorod Oblast, Russian SFSR, Soviet Union
- Citizenship: Russian Federation
- Occupations: film director, screenwriter, producer

Zhora Kryzhovnikov (Russian: Жора Крыжовников; born 14 February 1979) is a Russian film director, screenwriter and producer.

== Filmography ==
=== As director ===
- Big Difference (2008)
- A Lucky Buy (2010)
- A Сurse (2012)
- Kiss Them All! (2013)
- The Kitchen (2013)
- Kiss Them All! 2 (2014)
- Unintentionally (2014)
- The Very Best Day (2015)
- Yolki 6 (2017)
- Call DiCaprio! (2018)
- Ice 2 (2020)
- The Boy's Word: Blood on the Asphalt (2023)

=== As screenwriter ===
- A Lucky Buy (2010)
- A Curse (2012)
- Kiss Them All! (2013)
- Kiss Them All! 2 (2014)
- Unintentionally (2014)
- The Very Best Day (2015)
- Life Is Ahead (2017)
- Hasta que la boda nos separe (2018)
- Call DiCaprio! (2018)
- Yolki 7 (2018)

=== As producer ===
- A Lucky Buy (2010)
- The Very Best Day (2015)
