= List of Russian films of 2025 =

This is a list of films produced in Russia in 2025 (see 2025 in film).

== Film releases ==
Opening		Title	Russian title	Cast and crew	Details
J A N U A R Y	1	Finist. The First Warrior	Финист. Первый богатырь	Director: Dmitry Dyachenko; Cast: Kirill Zaytsev, Elena Yakovleva, Yulia Peresild, Fyodor Dobronravov, Sergey Lavygin, Kristina Stroiteleva, Fyodor Gamaleya	National Media Group Film Distribution / Yellow, Black and White A spin-off of "The Last Warrior" franchise.
J A N U A R Y	1	The Wizard of the Emerald City. Part I	Волшебник Изумрудного города. Дорога из жёлтого кирпича	Director: Igor Voloshin; Cast: Ekaterina Chervova, Yuri Kolokolnikov, Yevgeny Chumak, Artur Vakha, Svetlana Khodchenkova, Vasilina Makovtseva, Dmitry Chebotaryov, Sergey Epishev	Central Partnership / Kinoslovo / Studio TriTe Based on the 1939 novel of the same name by Alexander Melentyevich Volkov. The Wizard of the Emerald City. Part II (2027)
J A N U A R Y	23	Vasily	Василий (Vasiliy)	Director: Dmitry Litvinenko; Cast: Alexander Petrov, Bárbara de Regil, Valentina Mazunina, Pavel Vorozhtsov, Dmitry Lysenkov, Yan Tsapnik, Raisa Ryazanova	National Media Group Film Distribution / Art Pictures Studio / Vodorod Film Company A comedy about twins, Vasily and Nikolai, separated in childhood.
J A N U A R Y	30	Agnia	Агния	Director: Pavla Stratulat; Cast: Evgeniya Gromova, Sergey Gilyov, Alexandra Vinogradova, Alexandra Babaskina, Nil Bugaev, Mikhail Troynik	"Samokat" Film Distribution / Studio SLON A drama about a single mother from the Far North who is ready to do anything for a new place to live.
J A N U A R Y	30	Fierce Town	Злой город	Director: Konstantin Buslov; Cast: Aleksei Guskov, Aleksandr Metyolkin, Vladimir Lyubimtsev, Leonela Manturova, Aleksey Shevchenkov, Maksim Belborodov, Aleksey Rozin, Polina Chernyshova	"Karo Premier" Film Distribution / RB Production / Film company "22" A story about the Siege of Kozelsk
F E B R U A R Y	6	War and Music	Война и музыка	Director: Sarik Andreasyan; Cast: David Mkhitarel, Sergey Melkonyan, David Kotov-Oganesyan, Pavel Priluchny, Aleksey Kirsanov	"Cinema Atmosphere" Film Distribution / Andreasyan Brothers Film Company A war drama about three friends for whom music became a salvation on the battlefields of fascism.
F E B R U A R Y	13	ON and She	ON и Она	Director: Yevgeny Korchagin; Cast: Yulia Peresild, Aleksey Shirochkin, Igor Chernyavy, Kirill Zaytsev	"Karo-Premier" Film Distribution / Infiniti Content
F E B R U A R Y	14	The Poet	Пророк. История Александра Пушкина	Director: Felix Umarov; Cast: Yura Borisov, Roman Vasilyev, Alyona Dolgolenko, Ilya Vinogorsky, Anna Chipovskaya, Svetlana Khodchenkova, Sergey Gilyov, Ilya Lyubimov	Central Partnership / Kinoslovo / Studio TriTe / Studio Globus
F E B R U A R Y	20	Catherine the Great	Екатерина Великая	Director: Morad Abdel-Fattakh; Cast: Anna Mikhalkova, Olga Lerman, Nina Kucheruk	Central Partnership / 1-2-3 Production Sequel to the film Peter I: The Last Tsar and the First Emperor and The Empresses.
F E B R U A R Y	20	Red Silk	Красный шёлк	Director: Andrey Volgin; Cast: Miloš Biković, Gleb Kalyuzhny, Zheng Hanyi, Yelena Podkaminskaya, Gosha Kutsenko, Svetlana Chuikina, Yaroslav Mogilnikov	National Media Group Film Distribution / Nota Bene Film Group / Art Pictures Distribution / Hengdian World Studios A Russian-Chinese mystery film about one of the most unusual and dangerous National Congresses of the Chinese Communist Party.
F E B R U A R Y	27	The North Pole	Северный полюс	Director: Alexander Kott; Cast: Andrey Merzlikin, Yevgeny Mironov, Olga Lomonosova, Elena Sever	Central Partnership / Okko Studios / Sever Cinema A historical drama about the heroic deeds of the crew of the Soviet submarine K-3 "Leninsky Komsomol".
F E B R U A R Y	27	This Summer Will End	Кончится лето	Director: Maksim Arbugaev, Vladimir Munkuev; Cast: Yura Borisov, Makar Khlebnikov, Dmitry Podnozov, Aleksandr Mosin, Vasily Shchipitsyn	VLG.FILM / MC² Production / LookFilm / KION
M A R C H	6	The Frog Princess	Царевна-лягушка	Director: Aleksandr Amirov; Cast: Valentina Lyapina, Aleksandr Metyolkin	"Our Cinema" Film Distribution / KinoFirm A comedy based on the Russian fairy tale of the same name.
M A R C H	6	One Good Day	Один хороший день	Director: Kirill Belevich; Cast: Anastasia Talyzina, Roman Evdokimov	"Cinema Atmosphere" Film Distribution / 1-2-3 Production / Production company "Yar&Ko" A comedy about a provincial girl trapped in time.
M A R C H	6	Rodnina	Роднина	Director: Konstantin Statsky; Cast: Vladislava Samokhina, Ivan Kolesnikov, Yevgeny Tkachuk, Fedor Fedotov, Daniil Vorobyov	Central Partnership / WeiT Media / Gold Media Production A biography film about the path in sport of the outstanding Soviet figure skater Irina Rodnina.
M A R C H	20	Palma 2	Пальма 2	Director: Vladimir Kandaurov; Cast: Viktor Dobronravov, Leonid Basov, Vladimir Ilyin, Valeriya Fedorovich, Evgeniya Dmitrieva	Central Partnership / Mars Media Entertainment / AMedia / Russia-1 It is the sequel to the 2021 film A Dog Named Palma.
M A R C H	20	My Alien Friend	Ждун	Director: Dmitry Suvorov; Cast: Viktor Khorinyak, Yuliya Aleksandrova, Andrey Andreev, Margarita Silaeva	"Our Cinema" Film Distribution / Yes! Production / Okko Studios A family comedy about a meme hero.

Opening		Title	Russian title	Cast and crew	Details
A P R I L	3	Not Like Dad 2: Granddad	Батя 2: Дед	Director: Ilya Uchitel; Cast: Yevgeny Tsyganov, Vladimir Vdovichenkov, Andrey Andreev	Central Partnership / Good Story Media / Premier Studios / TNT It is the sequel to the 2021 film Dad.
A P R I L	10	I'm Suffocating with You	Я с тобой задыхаюсь	Director: Ivan Pshenin; Cast: Aleksandra Protasova, Andrey Mikhailov	"Lux Cinema" Film Distribution An action-packed romance about love in extreme circumstances.
A P R I L	17	Kraken	Кракен	Director: Nikolai Lebedev; Cast: Alexander Petrov, Viktor Dobronravov, Aleksei Guskov, Diana Pozharskaya, Anton Rival, Sergei Garmash	Central Partnership / Studio Trite A fantastic action film, submariners encounter a sea monster during an important mission.
A P R I L	24	The Postman	Почтарь	Director: Andrey Razenkov; Cast: Alexander Petrov, Inga Oboldina, Dmitry Kovgan, Aleksandr Michkov	National Media Group Film Distribution / KION / MTS Media / Trikita Entertainment / Virtual Kick Studio A detective drama about a young Soviet autistic postman in 1942.
M A Y	1	His Name Was Not Listed	В списках не значился	Director: Sergey Korotayev; Cast: Vladislav Miller, Alyona Morilova, Vladimir Mashkov, Yana Sekste, Vitaly Egorov, Yevgeny Miller	Central Partnership / Gazprom-Media / NTV / Temp Film Company / 1-2-3 Production / TROMEDIA / Oleg Tabakov Theatre
M A Y	1	Legends From The Past	Легенды наших предков	Director: Ivan Sosnin; Cast: Aleksandr Yatsenko, Anton Kuznetsov, Alexandra Babaskina, Natalya Pavlenkova, Maryana Spivak, Yuri Kolokolnikov	"Cinema Atmosphere" Film Distribution / ID Production / Red Pepper Film An adventure about a male journalist and his daughter who set off on an exciting journey to unravel the mysteries of the distant past.
M A Y	1	License to Love	Мужу привет	Director: Anton Maslov; Cast: Yulia Peresild, Vladimir Vdovichenkov	
M A Y	8	Blood Type	Группа крови	Director: Maksim Brius; Cast: Andrey Rudyka, Eva Williams, Mark Aleksandrov, Lyudmila Yulova	Central Partnership / 3xMedia
M A Y	8	The Finale	Финал	Director: Petr Zelenov, Oleg Presnyakov, Vladimir Presnyakov; Cast: Denis Shvedov	"Cinema Atmosphere" Film Distribution / Mystery Creative Association A sports story about the men's volleyball final at the XXX Olympic Games.
M A Y	8	The Five sons of Maria	Пять сыновей Марии	Director: Pavel Ignatov; Cast: Olga Lomonosova, Artyom Afonasov, Stanislav Demushin, Mark Kondratiev, Nikita Onosov, Valentin Sadiki	"Kino.Art.Pro" Film Distribution / "The Hut-film" Film Company A drama, the incredible story of Mother Maria, whose faith, hope and love proved stronger than war.
M A Y	15	My Deer Boy	Олень	Director: Mikhail Solovyov; Cast: Kuzma Saprykin, Olga Venikova, Danill Vakhrushev	Central Partnership / Gorad Production Center / TNT A ladies' man must find true love to break free from the curse of deer antlers.
M A Y	22	Nightingale vs. Muromets	Соловей против Муромца	Director: Karen Oganesyan; Cast: Nikita Yefremov, Vladimir Lyubimtsev, Timofey Kochnev, Mark-Malik Murashkin, Аnton Vasiliev, Yelena Valyushkina	"Cinema Atmosphere" Film Distribution / Kargo Film Science fiction about the treacherous Nightingale the Robber and the great Bogatyr Ilya Muromets.
M A Y	22	Philip Rules	Правила Филиппа	Director: Roman Kosov; Cast: Grigory Danishevsky, Elena Erbakova, Yuliya Yablonskaya	«LoonaFilm» Film Distribution / Interfest / Smart Film / Kinoprime Foundation A comedy drama about a young man with Down syndrome, Philip, who dreams of becoming a professional barista.
M A Y	22	Secret Magic Control Agency II: Mission Sleeping Beauty	Ганзель и Гретель: Миссия «Спящая красавица»	Director: Vladimir Nikolaev; Voice cast: Irina Obrezkova, Yuri Romanov, Polina Avdeyenko, Aleksandr Vasilyev, Artem Krylov, Andrey Lyovin	VLG.FILM / Voronezh Animation Studio / CTB Film Company
M A Y	29	The Yeti	Снежный Человек	Director: Oleg Asadulin; Cast: Sergey Staykin, Vladimir Steklov, Stepan Devonin, Katerina Shpitsa, Igor Grabuzov	"Karo-Premiere" Film Distribution / Kinoteka ltd. A family film about Yeti, whose appearance changes the lives of everyone who is lucky enough to meet him on his way.
J U N E	19	Eugene Telegin	Евгений Телегин	Director: Viktor Tikhomirov; Cast: Yevgeny Tkachuk, Yuri Galtsev, Tatyana Kolganova, Sergey Migitsko, Yury Kuznetsov	"Kino.Art.Pro" Film Distribution / Two Captains / Kinomir The drama based on the book "Eugene Telegin and Others" is a poem in prose by Viktor Tikhomirov, an artist, writer and director from St. Petersburg.
J U N E	19	The White Ship	Белый пароход	Director: Inga Shepeleva; Cast: Ella Sokolova, Alexander Koshkidko, Roman Atlasov	"K24" Film Distribution / Saydam Baryl / Kinoprime Foundation / Studio Otkrytie / Limitless Films / Mimesis This drama tells the love story of a teacher and a school principal, set against the backdrop of global changes in the country.

Opening		Title	Russian title	Cast and crew	Details
J U L Y		The Plagiarist	Плагиатор	Director: Anton Megerdichev; Cast: Roman Evdokimov, Stasya Miloslavskaya, Aglaya Shilovskaya, Maksim Lagashkin, Marat Basharov, Irina Pegova, Vitali Kishchenko, Yelena Panova	"Cinema Atmosphere" Film Distribution / Mars Media Entertainment / Arna Media An incendiary musical with hits from different years.
A U G U S T	14	We Need to Make Films about Love	Надо снимать фильмы о любви	Cast & Director: Roman Mikhaylov; Cast: Mark Eydelshteyn, Darya Bryukhanova, Alexandra Kiseleva, Maria Matsel	"K24" Film Distribution / FT Production / Vega Film / Respect India Entertainment Pvt. Ltd.
A U G U S T	21	Gelya	Геля	Director: Stas Ivanov; Cast: Ilya Malakov, Anton Vasiliev, Viktor Dobronravov, Anton Kuznetsov, Darya Melnikova, Juliet Shabanova, Anna Arefeva, Vitaliy Kovalenko	National Media Group Film Distribution / Yellow, Black and White / All Media A Start Company A fast-paced comedy about a truck driver who, for the sake of his family's future, agrees to steal a premium Gelendwagen, or simply "Gelya", not suspecting that he will cross the path of criminal elements.
A U G U S T	21	Rhythms of Dreams	Ритмы мечты	Director: Irina Borovskaya; Cast: Alisa Menyaykina, Matvey Kulagin, Eduard Menyaikin	"Karo-Premier" Film Distribution / MenyaiKING Children's dances about young heroes who will prove to themselves and adults that it is very important to believe in a dream and your own strength, and also to never give up.
A U G U S T	28	The Dino Family	Доктор Динозавров	Director: Maksim Volkov, Maya Turkina; Voice cast: Vladimir Voytyuk, Sergei Garmash, Vasilisa Savkina, Roman Kurtsyn, Simon, Timur Rodriguez	Central Partnership / "YARKO" Animation Studio An animated adventure film about a modern schoolboy who finds himself in the prehistoric world of dinosaurs.
A U G U S T	28	Identity	Идентификация	Director: Serik Beyseu; Cast: Anton Pampushnyy, Yevgeny Sidikhin, Viktoriya Agalakova, Anastasiya Reznik, Anton Lavrentev	National Media Group Film Distribution / KD Studios
S E P T E M B E R	4	Down	Вниз	Director: Maryus Vaysberg; Cast: Egor Kreed, Anfisa Chernykh, Igor Mirkurbanov	Central Partnership / Vice Films A newlywed couple gets stuck in an elevator with a maniac - a thriller.
S E P T E M B E R	11	Family Happiness	Семейное счастье	Director: Stasya Tolstaya; Cast: Evgeniya Leonova, Yevgeny Tsyganov	"Our Cinema" Film Distribution / Rock Films / AMedia / KION A drama about a young girl who falls in love with her guardian, based on Leo Tolstoy's novel of the same name.
S E P T E M B E R	11	Three Weddings and One Escape	Три свадьбы и один побег	Director: Kirill Loginov; Cast: Inga Oboldina, Polina Denisova, Roman Evdokimov, Aram Vardevanyan, Soslan Fidarov, Arina Zhelaeva, Galina Denisenko	"Pioneer" Film Distribution / WISH Media / 23MMOON Production
S E P T E M B E R	18	Angels Don't Buzz	Ангелы не жужжат	Director: Alexander Seliverstov; Cast: Andrei Zhilin, Nil Bugayev, Ulyana Pylaeva, Petr Rykov	"K24" Film Distribution / Human Creative Production
S E P T E M B E R	25	August	Август	Director: Nikita Vysotsky, Ilya Lebedev; Cast: Sergey Bezrukov, Nikita Kologrivy, Pavel Tabakov	Central Partnership / Cinema Directorate Studio

Opening		Title	Russian title	Cast and crew	Details
O C T O B E R	2	AI-4U Wired Together	(Не) искусственный интеллект	Director: Aleksey Chadov; Cast: Leon Kemstach, Alexandra Tikhonova, Lyuba Druzyak	National Media Group Film Distribution / CTB Film Company / Red Star Films
O C T O B E R	9	You Drive Me Crazy	Сводишь с ума	Director: Darya Lebedeva; Cast: Mila Ershova, Yuri Nasonov, Anton Vasiliev, Anton Artemyev, Nadezhda Ivanova, Lyudmila Artemyeva	"Cinema Atmosphere" Film Distribution / Forma-Film A fantasy comedy about lovers from parallel worlds.
O C T O B E R	9	Rowing for Gold	Первый на Олимпе	Director: Artyom Mikhalkov; Cast: Gleb Kalyuzhny, Andrey Smolyakov, Artyom Bystrov, Elena Lyadova, Vladimir Ilyin, Aleksei Kravchenko	Central Partnership / Star Media / Russia-1 A sports war film about the first Soviet Olympic rowing champion, Yuriy Tyukalov.
O C T O B E R	16	Lermontov. Doomsday	Лермонтов	Director: Bakur Bakuradze; Cast: Ilya Ozolin, Yevgeny Romantsov, Vera Engalycheva, Dmitry Solomykin, Andrey Maksimov, Urszula Malka	"K24" Film Distribution / CTB Film Company / SKIF / 1115 Film Production Studio A biopic about one of the most romantic Russian poets, whose life ended unexpectedly and extremely tragically.
O C T O B E R	16	Two People in One Life and a Dog	Двое в одной жизни, не считая собаки	Director: Andrey Zaytsev; Cast: Svetlana Kryuchkova, Aleksandr Adabashyan, Polina Gukhman	"SB Film" Film Distribution / September Film Studio
O C T O B E R	23	Alice in Wonderland	Алиса в Стране Чудес	Director: Yury Khmelnitsky; Cast: Anna Peresild, Oleg Savostyuk, Miloš Biković, Irina Gorbacheva, Paulina Andreeva, Andrey Fedortsov, Kristina Babushkina, Ilya Lykov	Central Partnership / Mediaslovo / KION Film Studio A full-length musical based on the fairy tale by Lewis Carroll, with songs based on poems and melodies by Vladimir Vysotsky. (Soviet audio concert, 1976)
O C T O B E R	23	My Pet Dragon	Горыныч	Director: Dmitry Khonin; Cast: Alexander Petrov, Viktoriya Agalakova, Aleksandr Robak, Sergei Makovetsky, Nina Usatova, Aleksey Filimonov, Roman Kurtsyn	VLG.FILM / Studio Globus / CTB Film Company / Russia-1 / CGF Company A fantasy comedy about a man who becomes a sailor in a fairy-tale world and takes care of a baby dragon.
N O V E M B E R	6	The Fiery Boy	Огненный мальчик	Director: Nadezhda Mikhalkova; Cast: Denis Kosikov, Julia Vysotskaya, Oksana Akinshina, Anna Mikhalkova, Aleksandr Ustyugov	VLG.FILM / Studio Globus / Backup Copy
N O V E M B E R	6	Virtual Assistant	Голосовой помощник	Director: Oleg Vitvitski; Cast: Polina Fedina, Boris Dergachyov, Ilya Antonenko, Vladislav Tsenyov, Yulia Dzhulai	Central Partnership / Irsna Media
N O V E M B E R	6	Wind	Ветер	Director: Sergey Chliyants; Cast: Daniil Feofanov, Serafima Goshchanskaya, Oleg Vasilkov	"HHG" Film Distribution / Pygmalion Production
N O V E M B E R	13	The Sum of the Squares of the Sides	Сумма квадратов катетов	Director: Kita Freiheit; Cast: Evgeniya Kaverau, Danya Kiselyov, Arseny Vays	VGIK-Debut
N O V E M B E R	13	Yaga on our heads	Яга на нашу голову	Director: Alexander Voitinsky; Cast: Aleksandr Samusev, Svetlana Khodchenkova, Yuri Kolokolnikov	National Media Group Film Distribution / Studio +1
N O V E M B E R	20	Woolfs	Волки	Director: Mikhail Kulunakov; Cast: Timur Kydykov, Arunai Tazranova, Aidar Unatov, Vadim Deev, Emil Kolbin	"K24" Film Distribution / RV Group / Kinoprime Foundation
N O V E M B E R	27	There is only MiG	Есть только МиГ	Director: Aleksandr Zhigalkin; Cast: Daniil Popov, Sofia Lopunova, Aleksey Shevchenkov, Svetlana Antonova, Anton Batyrev, Aleksey Dmitriev, Mikhail Evlanov	National Media Group Film Distribution / VoenFilm / SEREBRO / REN TV
D E C E M B E R	4	The Crazy Empress	Шальная императрица	Director: Radda Novikova; Cast: Irina Pegova, Angelina Strechina, Zoya Berber, Alisa Stasyuk, Kirill Zaytsev, Fyodor Gamaleya	"Our Cinema" Film Distribution Thanks to the efforts of magic lovers, Catherine II finds herself in modern-day St. Petersburg.
D E C E M B E R	4	Volchok	Волчок	Director: Konstantin Smirnov; Cast: Yevgeny Tkachuk, Mark-Malik Murashkin, Yulia Khlynina, Andrey Smolyakov, Sergei Makovetsky, Daniil Vorobyov	Central Partnership / MEM Cinema Production / Okko Studios
D E C E M B E R	18	New Year's Eve	Новый Год на Связи	Director: Mikhail Lyskovtsev; Cast: Danila Puzyrev, Denis Magan, Stanislav Chernyshev	"Cinemaus Studio" Film Distribution / Irkutsk Oil Company
D E C E M B E R	25	Three Bogatyrs And Light Wedge	Три богатыря и свет клином	Director: Darina Shmidt; Voice cast: Valery Solovyov, Dmitry Bykovsky, Oleg Kulikovich, Dmitry Vysotsky, Sergei Makovetsky	VLG.FILM / Melnitsa Animation Studio / CTB Film Company

=== Culturally Russian films ===
- Caught Stealing is a 2025 American dark comedy film directed by Darren Aronofsky.
- Heads of State is a 2025 American action comedy film directed by Ilya Naishuller.
- Idiotka is a 2025 American comedy film directed by Nastasya Popov.
- Pinocchio and the Water of Life is a 2025 animated film directed by Viktor Lakisov.

=== No dates ===
- 1984 is a science-fiction film by Diana Ringo.
- Captain Volkonogov Escaped is a thriller drama film by Natalya Merkulova and Aleksey Chupov.
- December is a mystery film by Klim Shipenko.
- Empire V is a dark fantasy film by Victor Ginzburg.
- One Little Nighttime Secret is a teen drama film by Nataliya Meshchaninova. (Official website at the CTB Film Company)
- We is a dystopian film directed by Hamlet Dulyan, adaption to Zamyatin's We.

== See also ==
- List of Russian films
- List of Russian films of 2026
