= Elke Hanel-Torsch =

Austrian politician (born 1981)

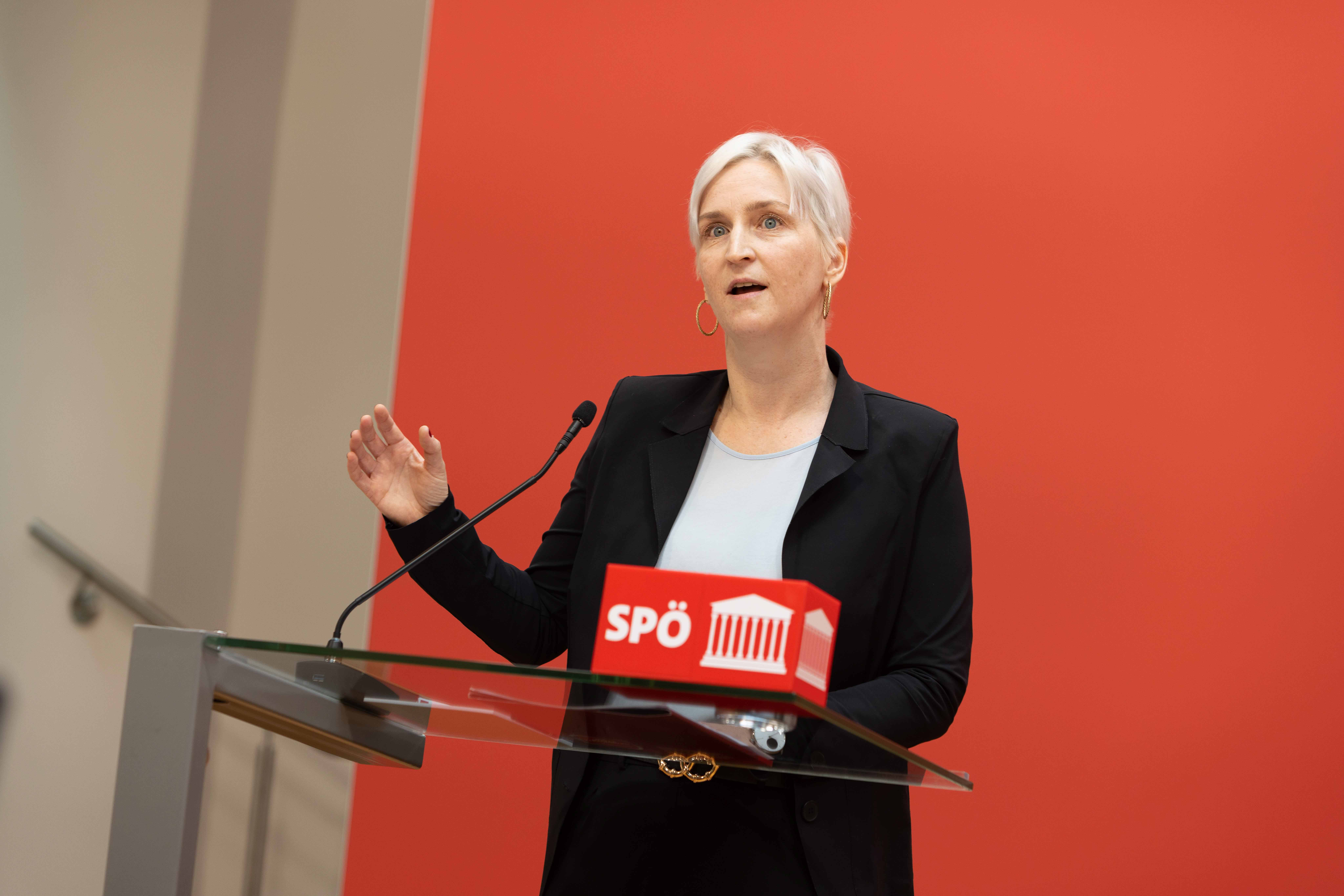
- Elke Hanel-Torsch in 2023

Member of the National Council
- Incumbent
- Assumed office 24 October 2024
- Constituency: Vienna

Personal details
- Born: 18 September 1981 (age 45) St. Veit an der Glan, Austria
- Party: Social Democratic Party
- Education: University of Vienna

Elke Hanel-Torsch (born 18 September 1981) is an Austrian politician and member of the National Council. A member of the Social Democratic Party, she has represented Vienna since October 2024.

Hanel-Torsch was born on 18 September 1981 in St. Veit an der Glan. She has a Magister Juris degree in law from the University of Vienna. She did her Gerichtspraxis at the District Court of Inner City and Regional Court for Civil Matters in Vienna. She was a legal advisor for the Tenants' Association Vienna (Mietervereinigung Wien) from 2006 to 2014 and its managing director from 2014 to 2016. She has been executive chairman of the association since 2016.

Hanel-Torsch has held various positions in the Margareten and Viennese branches of the Social Democratic Party (SPÖ) since 2020. She was a member of the district council (Bezirksvertretung) in Margareten from 2013 to 2024. She was elected to the National Council at the 2024 legislative election.

Electoral history of Elke Hanel-Torsch
Election	Electoral district	Party	Votes	%	Result
2024 legislative	Vienna Inner South	Social Democratic Party	622	2.63%	Not elected
2024 legislative	Vienna	Social Democratic Party	381	0.16%	Elected
2024 legislative	Federal List	Social Democratic Party	197	0.02%	Not elected
