= Onegin =

Onegin most often refers to Alexander Pushkin's 1833 verse novel Eugene Onegin. Works based on Pushkin's poem titled "Onegin" include:

- Eugene Onegin (opera), an opera by Tchaikovsky, derived from the novel
- Onegin (1999 film), a British-American film, derived from the novel
- Onegin (2024 film), a Russian historical romance film, derived from the novel
- Onegin (Cranko), a ballet created by John Cranko, derived from the novel

== People with the surname ==
- Sigrid Onégin (1889–1943), opera singer

== See also ==
- Eugene Onegin (disambiguation)
