= License to Love =

- Directed by: Anton Maslov
- Written by: Mariya Maslova
- Produced by: Eduard Iloyan; Denis Zhalinsky; Vitaly Shlyappo; Mikhail Tkachenko; Sergey Maevsky; Anton Maslov; Georgy Shabanov; Anna Ryzhikova
- Starring: Yulia Peresild; Vladimir Vdovichenkov; Kirill Rusin; Ekaterina Voronina; Sofya Zayka; Dmitry Lysenkov; Nelli Khapyorskaya
- Cinematography: Valery Makhmudov
- Edited by: Kirill Abramov
- Music by: Darya Charusha
- Production companies: Yellow, Black and White; START Studio
- Release dates: April 18, 2025 (Moscow Film Festival); May 1, 2025 (Russia)
- Running time: 107 minutes
- Country: Russia
- Language: Russian

License to Love (Russian: Мужу привет) is a 2025 Russian romantic comedy drama film produced and directed by Anton Maslov about love that arose despite circumstances, filmed in the best traditions of Soviet cinema. It stars Yulia Peresild and Vladimir Vdovichenkov.

This film was theatrically released on May 1, 2025.

== Plot ==
Positive Katerina works every day to bring men and women together, yet her marriage has long been on hold. Her husband has been in a coma for five years but this doesn't stop Katerina from waiting for him and loving him. Then suddenly, Georgy appears in her life changing it dramatically.

== Cast ==
- Yulia Peresild as Katerina
- Vladimir Vdovichenkov as Georgy
- Kirill Rusin as Denis
- Ekaterina Voronina
- Sofya Zayka
- Dmitry Lysenkov
- Nelli Khapyorskaya

== Production ==
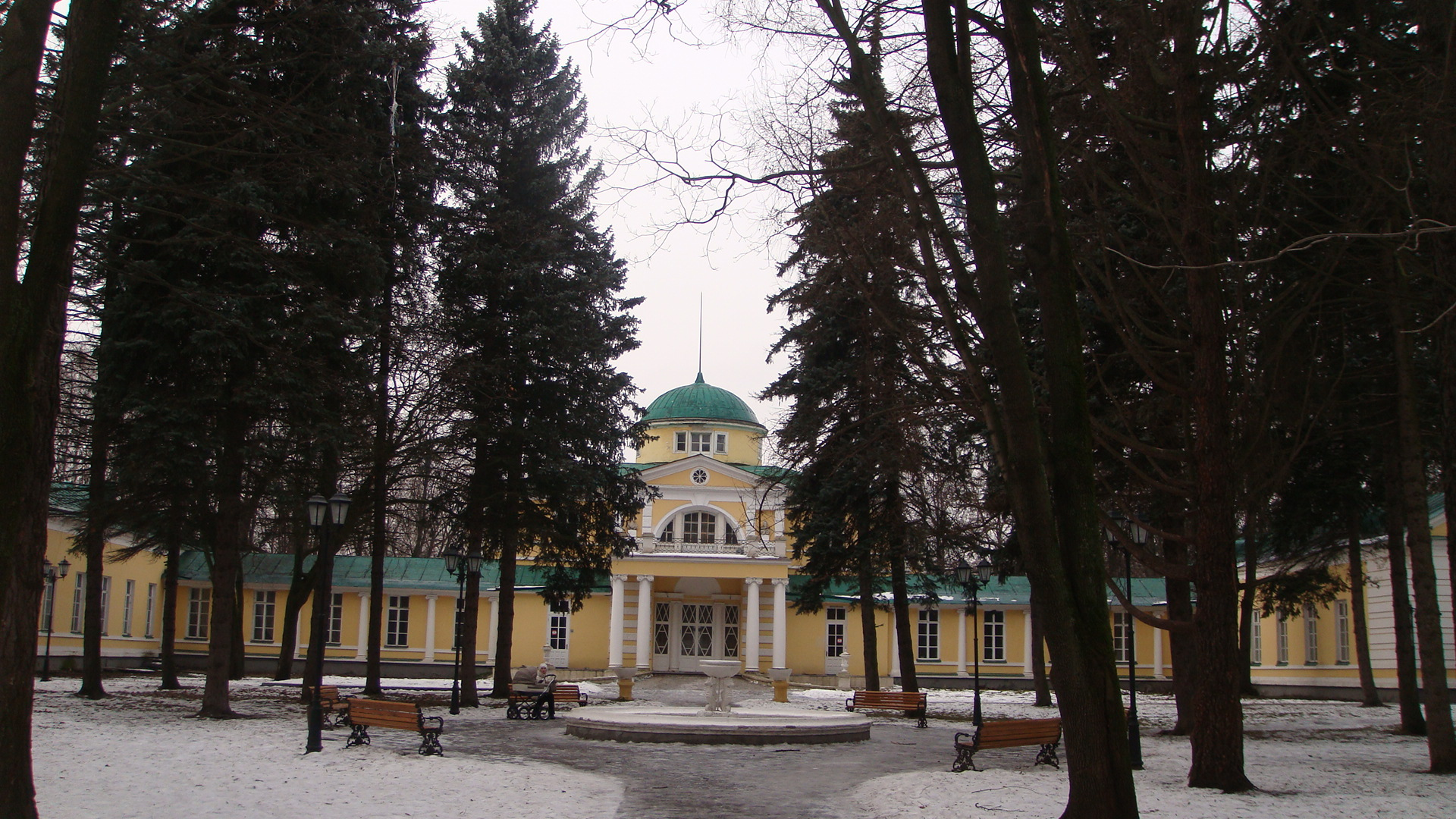
The Bratsevo estate in the village of Bratsevo near Moscow.

The film was produced by the film company Yellow, Black and White, and the online cinema START Studio. Filming began in December 2024 in Moscow, primarily in historical locations such as the Bratsevo estate.

== Release ==
=== Theatrical ===
The film premiered on April 18, 2025, as part of the "Russian Premieres" competition program of the Moscow International Film Festival. It was released in Russia on May 1, 2025.
