= Seryozha =

Seryozha is a Russian diminutive form of the name Sergei, which may refer to:

- Sergei Aleshkov, soviet son of the regiment and youngest person to have fought at Stalingrad
- Seryozha (novel), 1955 novel by Soviet writer Vera Panova
- Seryozha (English: Splendid Days), 1960 Soviet drama film adaptation of the novel
- 5094 Seryozha, minor planet
