= Sergei Aleshkov =

Soviet child soldier (1936–1990)

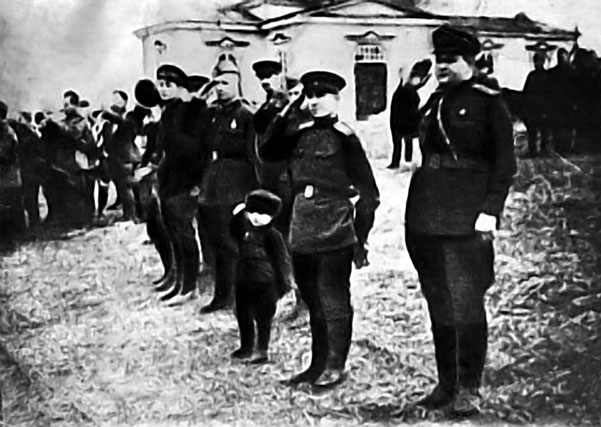
- Aleshkov receiving an award for his actions in 1943
- Native name: Сергей Алешков
- Born: sometime between 1934 and 1936; believed to be on February 15, 1936; Gryn', Western Oblast, Russian SFSR, Soviet Union (modern-day Kaluga Oblast, Russia)
- Died: February 1, 1990 (aged 53) Chelyabinsk, Chelyabinsk Oblast, Russian SFSR, Soviet Union (modern-day Russia)
- Allegiance: Soviet Union
- Conflicts: World War II: Battle of Stalingrad

Sergei Andreyevich Aleshkov (also Alyoshkov; Russian: Сергей Андреевич Алешков, sometime between 1934 and 1936 – 1 February 1990) was a Soviet child soldier, adopted "Son of the Regiment", and the youngest to serve in World War II at 6 years old.

== Biography ==
Sergei "Seryozha" Anderyevich Aleshkov (Russian: Сергей "Серёжа" Андреевич Алешков) was born in either 1934 or 1936, in the rural forest village of Gryn' (Russian: Грынь), back then in the Russian SFSR of the Soviet Union, to a large but poor Russian peasant family. He was believed to have been born either on 31 January or 15 February 1936, but it is unknown if these birth dates are correct, because there are no documents proving his birth date as he was born into a poor peasant family and grew up in a remote forest village. He was the fourth and youngest child of Andrei Aleshkov and his wife, Anastasia "Nastasya" Aleshkova. Seryozha's elder brothers were Ivan, Andrei, and Pyotr "Petya" Aleshkov. Like in many parts of the Soviet Union, Seryozha, his family, and the inhabitants of the village of Gryn became very poor and endured regular hardship and hunger during and also after the Soviet famine of 1930-1933.

Seryozha's father Andrei died from illness at an early age, supposedly before Seryozha turned two years old, so Seryozha and his brothers were raised by their single mother, Nastasya, who was known to be a poor and fragile but hardworking peasant woman. As she lacked occupational skills outside of farming, Nastasya Aleshkova soon got an agricultural job as a Soviet collective farm worker, in order to be able to provide for her children. After Nazi Germany invaded the Soviet Union in June 1941, Seryozha's elder brothers, Ivan and Andrei Aleshkov, left their family and village and enlisted in the Soviet Red Army to become soldiers. The brothers were subsequently sent to the frontline, but it is unknown if they survived the war or not. As Nazi Germany rapidly advanced through the Soviet Union, the entire Ulyanovsk District (where the village of Gryn is located) fell under German occupation by October 1941.

Because the village of Gryn was located deep in the forest, Soviet partisans fighting against the German occupation, established a partisan base in the village, and the people from the village strongly collobrated with the partisans, including Seryozha's mother Nastasya and her eleven-year-old son Pyotr "Petya" Aleshkov, who himself became a partisan.

In July or August 1942, after German officers discovered the partisan base and the association of the villagers with the Soviet partisans, the Germans massacred the people from the village and burned down their homes. During the massacre, Seryozha's brother Petya was tortured and then hanged from a tree by German officers as a "spy" merely because he was a partisan, and Seryozha's mother Nastasya was shot multiple times and murdered with a machine gun by a German Gestapo officer, while she attempted to rescue and save her son Petya from hanging. When the six-year-old Seryozha Aleshkov – who hid in a nearby vegetable garden and witnessed the murders of his elder brother and mother – came out of hiding and ran to his mother who was shot and murdered before his eyes, one of the German officers kicked him in the head aside with a boot, rendering him with head trauma and nearly unconscious. Seryozha was soon discovered and rescued by his aunt (or a neighbor) Anisya Ivanova, who took the boy in her arms and took him to her house, where she pushed Seryozha out of a window and told the boy to flee from the burning village, where the Germans were massacring the people, and run as fast and far as he could into the nearby large forest, where the German officers would not find or see him, thus saving his life; (according to a source, Anisya Ivanova was reportedly said to have survived the massacre and fled from the village, but the German officers reportedly raided and destroyed her house, which reportedly left Anisya homeless for many years). Seryozha ran away from the village and went deep into the forest, but he eventually got completely lost and spent several days wandering in the forest alone and with very little food or water. Soviet regimental reconnaissance discovered Seryozha during fighting in the Kozelsk area in August 1942. He was extremely thin and emaciated and could not walk or speak or even remember how long he spent in the forest alone. Seryozha was wrapped in a sack made of horse skin and was carried by the regimental reconnaissance across the frontline and sent him to the headquarters of a Soviet military unit. Seryozha was suffering from starvation, muscle atrophy, and numerous insect bites, and Mitrofan Danilovich Vorobych (born in 1909), the assistant commander of the 510th Guards Rifle Regiment, felt great pity for Seryozha and was furious by his condition, and all the soldiers in the unit reportedly cried. Seryozha was taken to the infirmary of the camp and he recovered there. After his recovery, the soldiers asked Seryozha about his name, but due to his young age, he mistakenly called himself as Sergei Aleshkin. When he was asked about where his mother was, Seryozha cried really hard and it took a long time for him to calm down. Assistant commander Mitrofan Danilovich Vorobych refused to let Seryozha Aleshkov be taken away and sent to an orphanage and ordered that the child should remain in the military base, believing this was the best place for Seryozha.

Seryozha especially liked and respected the commander Mitrofan Vorobych. The commander was infuriated with the situation and felt that Seryozha needed a father. So commander Mitrofan Vorobych, who was not married and did not have any children at the time, officially adopted Sergei "Seryozha" Aleshkov as his son on 8 September 1942, and Seryozha became the "Son of the Regiment". Despite his remarkably young age, the six year old Seryozha Aleshkov was recruited into the Soviet Red Army as a soldier by his adoptive father and became the youngest known soldier at just six years old. Because of his young age, Seryozha was forbidden from participating in combat operations and could not fight on the front. Instead, he was given tasks such as assisting and giving supplies to soldiers fighting on the front, giving letters to soldiers, and helping wounded soldiers in the infirmary. Seryozha would sometimes sing and dance for the soldiers in the regiment for entertainment. He was praised and respected by every soldier and nurse in the regiment for his courage, great assistance, and willingness to serve his country as a true patriot.

Later, Seryozha and the 47th Guards Rifle Division were transferred to fight in the Battle of Stalingrad. In early November 1942, the 510th Guards Rifle Regiment (the regiment where Sergei Aleshkov was a soldier) was surrounded by German troops near Stalingrad. During bombing and artillery shelling, Seryozha's adoptive father was trapped in a dugout. Seryozha went to the dugout and attempted to dig him out, trying so hard that his hands profusely bled, but failed to do so. Seryozha ran to soldiers of another regiment, risking his own life amidst the artillery shelling. With Seryozha participating, the soldiers dug Milkhail Vorobych out of the pit in the dugout. This great courage saved his adoptive father's life and for this Seryozha Aleshkov was awarded the Medal for Military Merit on 26 April 1943.

During the war, Seryozha Aleshkov found himself in life-threatening situations and was nearly killed several times while on the front. In one situation, Seryozha insisted on being promoted to the rank of lieutenant in the regiment and was given a junior lieutenant uniform as a joke by a soldier. Seryozha was shot in the foot by a German Luftwaffe enemy airplane flying above. In another situation, he nearly drowned while attempting to cross the Siversky Donets River with his regiment, in May 1943, and an unidentified Soviet soldier jumped into the river and saved his life at the last second.

As the Soviet Red Army rapidly advanced through the Soviet Union and liberated large parts of the Soviet Union from German occupation, Seryozha Aleshkov traveled with his regiment to Poland. In 1944, Seryozha Aleshkov, now eight years old, left Poland after he was wounded during a battle and sent back to Russia where he recovered from his wounds in a hospital. From there, at the order of the Soviet Red Army commander Vasily Chuikov, Seryozha was sent to the Tula Suvorov Military School to study there. While Seryozha Aleshkov was interested in sports and martial arts (he even earned ranks and high scores in boxing and sambo), and had a very good physical performance, Seryozha struggled and did very poorly in his academic performance. After graduating from Tula Suvorov Military School, Seryozha Aleshkov entered a military academy.

Seryozha Aleshkov's future military career was unsuccessful due to his poor health as he had been smoking heavily from a young age, so he was expelled from the military academy and subsequently rejected from returning back to the Soviet military. In his later life, Seryozha Aleshkov and his adoptive father, assistant commander Mitrofan Vorobych, went to live in Chelyabinsk, where Mitrofan Vorobych got married and had several children, but always considered his adoptive son Seryozha as a part of his family. Seryozha Aleshkov went to study law at Kharkiv, and Seryozha became a engineer at a plant, and later a legal advisor, but his chain smoking addiction put him in poor health, as a friend claimed in an interview that "Seryozha smoked like a chimney". Seryozha Aleshkov eventually died of a heart attack on 1 February 1990, when he was only 54 to 56 years old, at a bus stop on his way to work in Chelyabinsk. Before his fatal heart attack, Seryozha's last words reportedly were: "At least I live longer than Adolf Hitler", while talking to a colleague about his experiences as a child soldier in the Soviet Red Army during World War II. Seryozha Aleshkov was buried with military honors in the Uspensky Cemetery in Chelyabinsk. In 1991, Seryozha's adoptive father, Mitrofan Vorobych, died and was buried with military honors in the same cemetery in Chelyabinsk. After the deaths of Seryozha Aleshkov and Mitrofan Vorobych, two single shots were fired into the sky at the city square of Chelyabinsk in their honor for their military service at the Battle of Stalingrard. Seryozha's brother Pyotr "Petya" Aleshkov and their mother Anastasia "Nastasya" Aleshkova, victims murdered by German officers during World War II, were buried in a old and rural Russian Orthodox graveyard in their village Gryn, Kaluga Oblast, as it is shown and depicted in a old black and white photograph shortly after World War II, which can be found in some remote Russian sources.

== In popular culture ==
The film Soldier Boy (2019) depicts Sergei's experiences during the war. Sergei is played by Andrey Andreev.

Rabbit, Soldier, Angel, Thief (2022) by Katrina Nannestad is loosely based on Sergei's experience.
