= Lyubka =

- Russian: Любка
- Directed by: Stanislav Mitin
- Written by: Stanislav Mitin; Dina Rubina
- Produced by: Aleksandr Kushaev; Irina Smirnova
- Starring: Elena Lyadova; Anastasiya Gorodentseva; Natalya Chernyavskaya; Aleksandr Sirin; Artyom Artemev
- Cinematography: Vitaly Konevtsov
- Edited by: Alexander Pavlov
- Release date: 2009
- Country: Russia
- Language: Russian

Lyubka (Russian: Любка) is a 2009 Russian drama film directed by Stanislav Mitin.

== Plot ==
The film tells about two different girls, one of whom grew up on the street and is engaged in theft, while the other was brought up in a prosperous family and studied well. And suddenly they intersect with each other in one provincial city.

== Cast ==
- Elena Lyadova as Lyubka
- Anastasiya Gorodentseva as Irina Michaylovna
- Natalya Chernyavskaya as Faina Semenovna - Irina's mother
- Aleksandr Sirin as Fedor Nikolaevich
- Artyom Artemev
- Marina Kudelinskaya
- Olga Onishchenko
- Vladimir Goryushin
- Timofey Tribuntsev
- Elena Dubrovskaya
