= Bimmer (film) =

- Bimmer release poster
- Directed by: Peter Buslov
- Written by: Peter Buslov; Denis Rodimin
- Produced by: Sergei Chliyants
- Starring: Vladimir Vdovichenkov; Andrei Merzlikin
- Distributed by: CTB Film Company
- Release date: 2 August 2003 (Russia)
- Running time: 110 minutes
- Country: Russia
- Language: Russian
- Budget: $700,000

Bimmer (Russian: Бумер, romanized: Bumer [ˈbumʲɪr]) is a 2003 Russian road movie directed by Peter Buslov who co-wrote it with Denis Rodimin. The plot revolves around four friends who get into trouble with the law and flee Moscow in a black BMW (the eponymous "bimmer").

As the gang drives across the Russian landscape, they encounter corruption, violence, poverty, and various situations characterizing the bleakness and challenges of small-town life in post-Soviet Russia.

Considered to be not only a crime drama but also a critique of the policies of Boris Yeltsin, Bimmer depicts the economic crisis that followed Russia's sudden transition to a free market economy, and with it, a lost generation of men who grow up in a world ruled by criminal gangs and corrupt law enforcement.

Despite a modest budget of only $700,000 and a limited cinematic release, Bimmer became a cult classic in Russia, Ukraine and other countries in Eastern Europe, praised both for its cinematic quality as well as its soundtrack. Both the film and soundtrack have won numerous awards, including the Golden Aries from the Russian Guild of Film Critics.

== Plot ==
Four members of an underground car theft ring named Kostya (nicknamed "Cat"), Ramah, Killa and Dimon get into serious trouble while stealing a 1995 BMW 750i from an important member of the secret police as revenge for the assault of Dimon and the impounding of his Mercedes-Benz E-Class following a road rage incident, and must run away from Moscow.

The crew encounters numerous obstacles while on the run. They fight with rival gangsters and corrupt members of the police, the car also runs out of gas and gets a flat tire. Cat must deal with the fallout of his broken relationship, Ramah finds himself a girlfriend, but is unable to settle down due to his lifestyle of being an outlaw, Killa puts himself and the gang in much trouble due to his extreme temper and tendencies towards violence and Dimon gets stabbed with a screwdriver during a heated scuffle.

During the film, they progressively find themselves in more and more dire situations, which is usually their fault, but they also find solace in friendship and in the protection of good, caring people.

In the climax of the film, after evading law enforcement for some time and finding themselves without money, an injured Dimon and the inability to return to their previous gang lives, they make an attempt to rob a lucrative computer store in a small town after a night out with some of the stores female employees. However, off-camera, the robbery goes horribly wrong and Ramah and Killa are killed in a shootout with the local police, with Cat not confirmed to be killed, but implied to be shot dead off-screen.

Dimon, who was left as the getaway driver of the BMW (presumably due to his injury) contemplates joining his friends in the gunfight. However, he drives away, although clearly distraught over the death of his friends, and flees into the nearby countryside. Abandoning the car on a muddy country road and catching a bus out of town.

The last shot of the film is of the abandoned BMW's lights slowly fading away as the car battery dies. Symbolizing the death of not only the group, but the death of their friendship and their way of life as well.

Throughout the film, Cat's mobile cell phone continuously rings inside the vehicle, unbeknownst to Cat, who had lost it previously in the beginning of the film. Its ringtone is the basis of the theme music of the movie.

== Reception ==
Film critics Andrei Plakhov and Mikhail Trofimenko classified the film as a road movie, with the latter also adding "pulp fiction" to its description. The film was compared to the TV series Brigada as a more modest work and was also called the direct antithesis of Antikiller, described as "closing the gangster theme in Russian cinema, clearly stating that the lawlessness of the 1990s is not just a subject for mockery and action-packed shootouts, but a real tragedy that took many lives." The soundtrack by Sergei Shnurov, as well as the directing and cinematography by Pyotr Buslov and Daniil Gurevich, received praise.

According to Plakhov, the film is unlikely to become widely popular due to the presence of vulgarity and extensive use of obscene language, which "dooms the film to marginality, whereas in puritanical America, it would only help it fit into the realm of mainstream cinema."

Film critic Alexei Exler described the film as "disgusting, vile, repulsive, and leaving an exceptionally loathsome aftertaste."

Actor Andrei Merzlikin, who played Dimon, described the film as follows: "The theme of the film is that Bimmer is not about the car, but about the word 'boomerang'—that every word, every action a person takes carries responsibility. The film is about responsibility: whatever you do, you are responsible for it, and if you do something bad, you will face the consequences accordingly."

== Sequel ==
In 2006, Bimmer: Film Vtoroy, a sequel to Bimmer, was released, this time featuring a BMW X5 SUV. It was directed by Peter Buslov and written by Kim Belov, Peter Buslov, Denis Rodimin and Ivan Vyrypaev. The film proved to be very commercially successful, taking in nearly US$14,000,000 at the box office, despite lower average review scores than the first film. A video game was released in the same year, titled Bimmer: Torn Towers.
