= Batya 2: Ded =

- Directed by: Ilya Uchitel
- Written by: Aleksey Litvinenko; Pavel Tikhomirov; Anton Zaytsev
- Produced by: Vadim Vereshchagin; Anton Zaitsev; Pavel Tikhomirov
- Starring: Yevgeny Tsyganov; Vladimir Vdovichenkov; Andrey Andreev; Stas Starovoytov; Nadezhda Mikhalkova; Stepan Devonin; Anastasiya Talyzina
- Cinematography: Pavel Medvedev
- Music by: Savva Rozanov
- Production companies: Good Story Media; TNT; Central Partnership
- Release date: April 3, 2025 (Russia)
- Country: Russia
- Language: Russian

Batya 2: Ded (Russian: Батя 2: Дед) is a 2025 Russian comedy-drama film directed by Ilya Uchitel, a sequel to the 2021 film Batya. It stars Yevgeny Tsyganov, Vladimir Vdovichenkov and Andrey Andreev. This film was theatrically released on April 3, 2025.

== Plot ==
Max's parents divorce and send him to the village to live with his grandfather, who becomes a true friend and teacher. In the village, Max learns life lessons and meets a girl he falls in love with.

== Cast ==
- Yevgeny Tsyganov
- Vladimir Vdovichenkov as Vladimir
- Andrey Andreev
- Stas Starovoytov as Max
- Nadezhda Mikhalkova as Irina
- Stepan Devonin as Vladislav
- Anastasiya Talyzina as Nyura

== Production ==
Filming took place in Kyn, Kozino and Moscow.
