= Orlean (film) =

- Directed by: Andrey Proshkin
- Written by: Yuri Arabov
- Produced by: Igor Mishin; Natalia Gostyushina
- Starring: Elena Lyadova; Vitaliy Khaev; Viktor Sukhorukov
- Cinematography: Yury Raysky
- Music by: Alexey Aygi; The Tiger Lillies
- Production companies: STN-Film; Aksioma Media; Aprel Mig Pictures; Solaris Promo Production
- Distributed by: Central Partnership
- Release date: 2015
- Running time: 110 minutes
- Country: Russia
- Language: Russian
- Budget: $2 500 000
- Box office: $302 192

Orlean (Russian: Орлеан) is a 2015 Russian film directed by Andrey Proshkin, screenplay by Yuri Arabov.

The film participated in the competition program of the XXXVII Moscow International Film Festival. For her starring role, Elena Lyadova was awarded the prize Silver George for Best Actress.

== Plot ==
The small town of Orlean, located on the shores of the salt lake in the Altai steppe. In the hospital room where after yet another abortion the local beauty Lidka lies, appears a strange gentleman who identifies himself as Pavlyuchek, executioner. His questions drive Lidka to hysterics and she runs for help to her friend surgeon Rudik. In a changed appearance the clerk appears in the apartment of Rudik, where lies his paralyzed father in a bad condition.

== Cast ==
- Elena Lyadova as Lidka
- Oleg Yagodin as Rudik
- Vitaly Khaev as Nevolin
- Viktor Sukhorukov as Executioner
- Timofey Tribuntsev as Borya Amaretto
- Pavel Tabakov as Igor

== Criticism ==
- The Hollywood Reporter: In this literature-centric and one hundred percent acting film, given its specific genre, it was easy to fall into the slapstick, as in tartare. But in this lies the director's courage and skill of Andrey Proshkin.
- Afisha: It is difficult to watch this film - just like a human being: there is practically no sense of taste in it, and there are tangible problems with a sense of proportion.
- Ogoniok: Andrey Proshkin's film has a rare, inexplicable quality of appeal to the future (at the same time, we still understand that 99 percent of the rest of today's films are directed to the past or to nothing at all). At the same time the film has a rare charge of positivity. You literally leave the cinema with the feeling that victory is near.
