= Ivan Rimsky-Korsakov =

Russian courtier

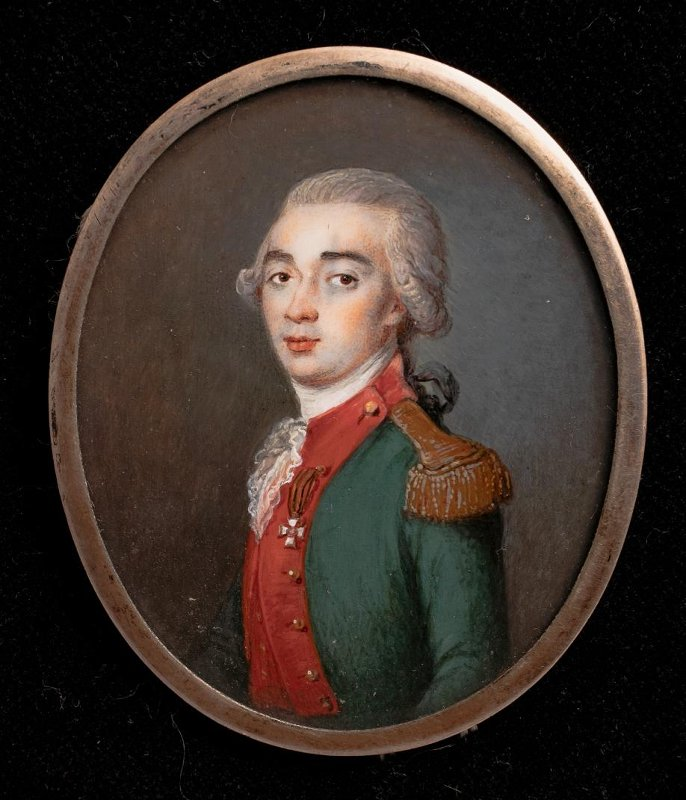
Portrait of I. N. Rimsky-Korsakov

Ivan Nikolajevich Rimsky-Korsakov, né Korsav (29 June 1754 – 31 July 1831 in Saint Petersburg, Russian Empire), was a Russian courtier and lover of Catherine the Great from 1778 to 1779.

== Early life ==
Rimsky-Korsakov was born on 29 June 1754 in Saint Petersburg, Russian Empire. He was a son of Nikolai Semyonovich Rimsky-Korsakov and brother to Pyotr Nikolaevich Rimsky-Korsakov. He was a member of the same family which produced composer Nikolai Rimsky-Korsakov.

== Personal life ==
=== Relationship with Catherine the Great ===
Ivan Rimsky-Korsakov was introduced to Catherine by Grigory Potemkin after he had been vetted by Praskovja Bruce. Rumours that Catherine had her ladies-in-waiting 'test' her potential favorites are unsubstantiated by the historical record. Furthermore, Potemkin played an important role in Catherine's life, but there is no evidence to suggest that he literally picked and presented his successors in the bedchamber to Catherine.

Catherine called Korsakov Pyrrhus because of his classic beauty, his singing and his violin playing. In 1779, Catherine caught him being unfaithful with Bruce. It is believed that she was directed to the right room by Aleksandra von Engelhardt on the order of Potemkin, who wished for the fall of both Rimsky-Korsakov and Bruce. In that case, Potemkin succeeded since Rimsky-Korsakov and Bruce lost their positions at court.

=== Relationship with Countess Stroganova ===
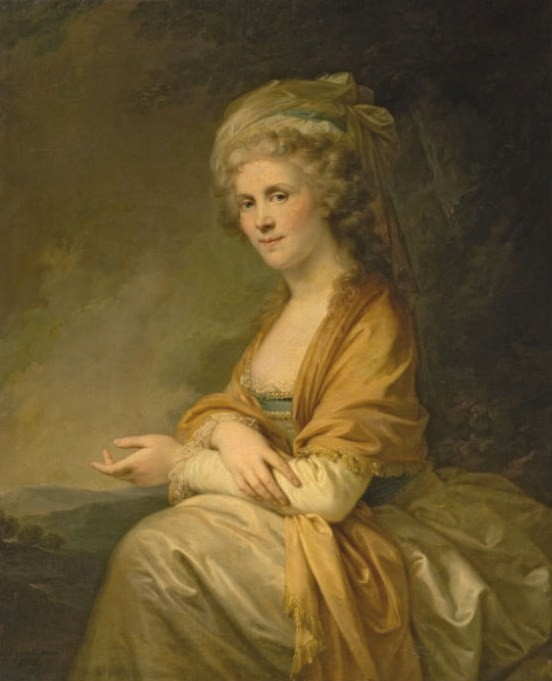
Portrait of Countess Stroganova

Rimsky-Korsakov lived the rest of his life in Brattsevo Estate, near Moscow, in a relationship with the married Countess Stroganova (1754–1815) (née Princess Ekaterina Petrovna Trubetskaya), the wife of Count Alexander Sergeyevich Stroganov. Together, they had four children (who were given the name Ladomirsky, the name of an extinct Polish noble family, and were ennobled by an imperial “ukaze” on 11 November 1798):

- Varvara Ivanovna Ladomirsky (1785–1840), who married Ivan Dimitrievitch Narishkin.
- Vladimir Ladomirsky
- Vasily Ivanovich Ladomirsky (1786–1847), who married Princess Sofya Ladomirskaya.
- Sophia Ladomirsky

He died on 31 July 1831 in Saint Petersburg, Russian Empire.

=== Descendants ===
Through his natural daughter Varvara, he was the grandfather of Prince Nikolai Borisovich Yusupov (1827–1891), who married Princess Tatiana Alexandrovna Yusupova and great-grandfather of Princess Zinaida Yusupova (1861–1939).
