= A Time to Gather Stones =

- Russian: Время собирать камни
- Directed by: Aleksei Karelin
- Written by: Linda Schreyer; Sergey Tkachev
- Produced by: Alexandr Litvinov; Vladimir Menshov
- Starring: David Bunners; Vladimir Vdovichenkov; Olga Krasko; Andrey Fedortsov; Vladimir Menshov
- Cinematography: Aleksandr Nosovskiy
- Production company: Mosfilm
- Release date: 2005
- Running time: 110 min.
- Country: Russia
- Language: Russian

A Time to Gather Stones (Russian: Время собирать камни, romanized: Vremya sobirat kamni) is a 2005 Russian war film directed by Aleksei Karelin. The film takes place in post-war Russia. German lieutenant Onesorg wants to atone for his guilt. Captain Demin lost his family and health and, due to circumstances, was forced to cooperate with the German.

== Plot ==
In May and June of 1945, though Nazi Germany has surrendered, the aftermath of war lingers both in the mine-strewn fields and in people’s unsettled lives. German sapper lieutenant Rudolf Ohnesorg arrives at Soviet headquarters to reveal his role in a mission to plant explosives at critical sites across Soviet territory. The mines are set to detonate soon, and Ohnesorg, driven by a sense of duty, offers to help with demining. Soviet Captain Dyomin is assigned to the task, joined by Ohnesorg and a translator, Nelya.

As they work together, the former enemies are forced to rely on each other in life-threatening situations, and a tenuous bond forms. However, during one mission, Ohnesorg is killed, leaving Dyomin to complete the operation alone. The film closes with scenes reflecting the transition from war to peace, set against a broadcast of the Victory Parade from Moscow’s Red Square.

== Cast ==
- David Bunners as Ohnesorg (as David C. Bunners)
- Vladimir Vdovichenkov as Captain Demin
- Olga Krasko as Nela
- Andrey Fedortsov as Vasily Muhin
- Vladimir Menshov as General
- Fyodor Dobronravov as divisional engineer
