= Soldier Boy (film) =

2019 Russian film by Viktoria Fanasiutina

Soldier Boy (2019)
- Poster
- Russian: Солдатик
- Directed by: Viktoria Fanasiutina
- Produced by: Viktoria Fanasiutina
- Starring: Andrey Andreev, Darya Ursulyak, Viktor Dobronravov
- Release date: 22 February 2019
- Running time: 86 minutes
- Countries: Russia, Belarus, Ukraine, Germany, Latvia, Estonia, Kazakhstan, Mongolia
- Languages: Russian, German

Soldier Boy (Russian: Солдатик, romanized: Soldatik) is a 2019 Russian-language film. It is based on the real-life story of the youngest soldier in World War II, Sergei Aleshkov, who was only 6 years old.

== Synopsis ==
The film is based on the true story of a six-year-old boy who became a Soviet war hero during World War II. The film shows the struggle of war and the horrific scenes the boy witnessed during the war. Sergei (Seryozha) Aleshkov loses his family, and the last remaining member of his family (his aunt) is captured by the Germans. Sergei is then rescued by an army regiment 142nd Guards Rifle Regiment of the 47th Guards Rifle Division). He is adopted by the unit commander, Commander Kuznetsov, and becomes the youngest member of a regiment in WWII. In addition to being beloved by the soldiers of the unit, he distinguishes himself with numerous heroic acts, for which he earns the Medal "For Battle Merit" on April 26, 1943.

== Cast ==
- Andrey Andreev as Sergei Aleshkov
- Viktor Dobronravov as Commander Kuznetsov (Nikolai Sergeevich Kutzenov)
- Daria Ursulyak as nurse Katya
- Andrey Novik as scout Andrey
