= The One (2022 film) =

- Directed by: Dmitry Suvorov
- Written by: Dmitry Suvorov; Andrey Nazarov
- Produced by: Andrey Lyakhov; Anna Bochkareva; Anton Belov; Maksim Rogalsky; Eduard Tyncherov; Denis Matveev; Dmitry Suvorov
- Starring: Nadezhda Kaleganova; Maksim Ivanov; Viktor Dobronravov; Yan Tsapnik; Anna Dubrovskaya; Vladimir Vinogradov; Mariya Sokova; Vladislav Vetrov
- Cinematography: Mikhail Kelim
- Edited by: Tim Pavelko
- Music by: Vadim Karpenko
- Production companies: SSB Films; Ministry of Culture
- Distributed by: Nashe Kino (transl. Our Cinema)
- Release date: June 9, 2022
- Running time: 108 minutes
- Country: Russia
- Language: Russian
- Box office: $5.7 million

The One (Russian: Одна, romanized: Odna, lit. 'Alone') is a 2022 Russian disaster-survival adventure film written, co-produced and directed by Dmitry Suvorov. The film is based on the real events that occurred in 1981 Aeroflot Flight 811, when rescuers found a twenty-year-old student who survived after falling from a height of 5 kilometers.

The only survivor of the Antonov An-24RV, passenger Larisa Savitskaya, played by Nadezhda Kaleganova, is rescued from the forest on August 27, 1981. The film's cast includes Maksim Ivanov, Viktor Dobronravov and Yan Tsapnik.

== Plot ==
On August 24, 1981, newlyweds Larisa and Vladimir Savitsky, returning from their honeymoon, board a plane to fly from Komsomolsk-on-Amur to Blagoveshchensk in the Soviet Union. 30 minutes before landing, their AN-24 civilian aircraft collides with a Soviet Air Force Tu-16K bomber and breaks up at an altitude of more than 5 kilometers. No one is expected to survive, but a miracle happens: Larisa Savitskaya wakes up in the middle of the wreckage of the plane in the remote taiga. Now she must create her own miracle, which only a strong-minded person is capable of.

== Cast ==
- Nadezhda Kaleganova as Larisa Savitskaya
- Maksim Ivanov as Vladimir "Volodya" Savitsky
- Viktor Dobronravov as Knyazev
- Yan Tsapnik as a pilot
- Anna Dubrovskaya as Raisa Avdeyeva, Larisa's mother
- Vladimir Vinogradov as Ivan, Larisa's stepfather
- Mariya Sokova as Galina Savitskaya, Volodya's mother
- Vladislav Vetrov as Viktor Savitsky, Volodya's father
- Vitaliya Korniyenko as a little girl in an airplane
- Anna Bachalova as the girl's mother in an airplane
- Leonid Gromov as chairman
- Nikita Tarasov as air traffic controller 1
- Aleksey Polyakov as air traffic controller 2
- Vladimir Steklov as Knyazev's supervisor

== Production ==
It was filmed in the summer of 2020 in the Perm Krai. Larisa Savitskaya herself was present on the set as a consultant. The script of the film was also written jointly with Larisa based on her stories. The idea to make this film came from producer Anton Belov after he watched a TV program about plane crash survivors.

=== Casting ===
For Nadezhda Kaleganova, actress of the Moscow Art Theatre named after Chekhov, this is the first big role on the big screen. Kaleganova said that Larisa Savitsaya supported her during the filming, gave her the right attitude.

=== Filming ===
Principal photography began in August 2020, taking place on the territory of Kizel, Gubakha, Gremyachinsk and in other areas of the Perm Krai.

=== Release ===
The One was theatrically released in the Russian Federation on June 9, 2022, by "Nashe Kino" (transl. "Our Cinema"). Larisa Savitskaya also appeared at the premiere, whose story formed the basis of the script.

== See also ==
- List of sole survivors of aviation accidents and incidents
