= Eugene Onegin (disambiguation) =

Eugene Onegin is a novel in verse by Alexander Pushkin.

Eugene Onegin may also refer to:

- Eugene Onegin (opera), an 1879 opera by Pyotr Tchaikovsky
- Eugene Onegin (1911 film), a Russian short film
- Eugene Onegin (1959 film), a Soviet opera film
- Onegin (1999 film), a British-American film, derived from the novel
- Onegin (2024 film), a Russian historical romance film, derived from the novel
- Onegin (Cranko), ballet created by John Cranko
