= Batya (film) =

- Directed by: Dmitry Yefimovich
- Written by: Aleksey Litvinenko; Pavel Tikhomirov; Aleksandr Kagarmanov
- Produced by: Anton Zaytsev; Artyom Loginov; Anton Shchukin
- Starring: Vladimir Vdovichenkov; Andrey Andreev; Elena Lyadova; Stanislav Starovoytov; Nadezhda Mikhalkova; Sevastyan Bugayev; Diana Yenakayeva
- Cinematography: Aleksandr Tamanov
- Production company: Good Story Media
- Distributed by: Central Partnership
- Release date: February 23, 2021
- Running time: 75 minutes
- Country: Russia
- Language: Russian

Batya (Russian: Батя — a dad) is a 2021 Russian comedy-drama film directed by Dmitry Yefimovich. It was released to theaters on February 23, 2021 by Central Partnership.

A sequel, Batya 2: Ded, was released on Central Partnership in April 2025.

== Plot ==
Max's father, Vladimir, is turning 70, so Max invites him to celebrate in Moscow. However, Vladimir changes his mind at the last moment, prompting Max to travel to his father’s home, bringing along his reluctant wife, Irina, and their children, Dima and Nastya. On the way, family tensions rise as Max and Irina clash over their parenting methods, triggering a series of flashbacks to Max’s childhood, where Vladimir is depicted as a stern and unyielding figure who showed love in tough, unconventional ways. Growing up during the turbulent post-Soviet 1990s, Max recalls how Vladimir taught him to read using political newspapers and count with gravestones, and once even involved him in smuggling factory materials to make ends meet. Despite these harsh lessons, the memories reveal a complex father who, while distant, was driven by his sense of duty in a collapsing world.

When the family arrives, they find Vladimir has taken a job as a night watchman due to his small pension, refusing all financial help from Max. Inside his childhood home, Max reflects on the pain of his mother leaving when Vladimir struggled with alcohol after the Soviet Union’s fall. Confronting his father, Max accuses him of emotional neglect, revealing the deep wounds of never hearing words of love. The turning point comes as Vladimir admits he should be more open with his family, while Max acknowledges that despite his father’s coldness, he holds cherished memories that made his childhood feel happy. This shared moment of understanding bridges the gap between them, showing that while imperfect, their bond endures.

== Cast ==
- Vladimir Vdovichenkov
- Andrey Andreev
- Elena Lyadova
- Stanislav Starovoytov
- Nadezhda Mikhalkova
- Sevastyan Bugayev
- Diana Yenakayeva
