= Vienna Inner South (National Council electoral district) =

Parliamentary electoral district in Austria

- Wien Innen-Süd
- Electoral District for the National Council
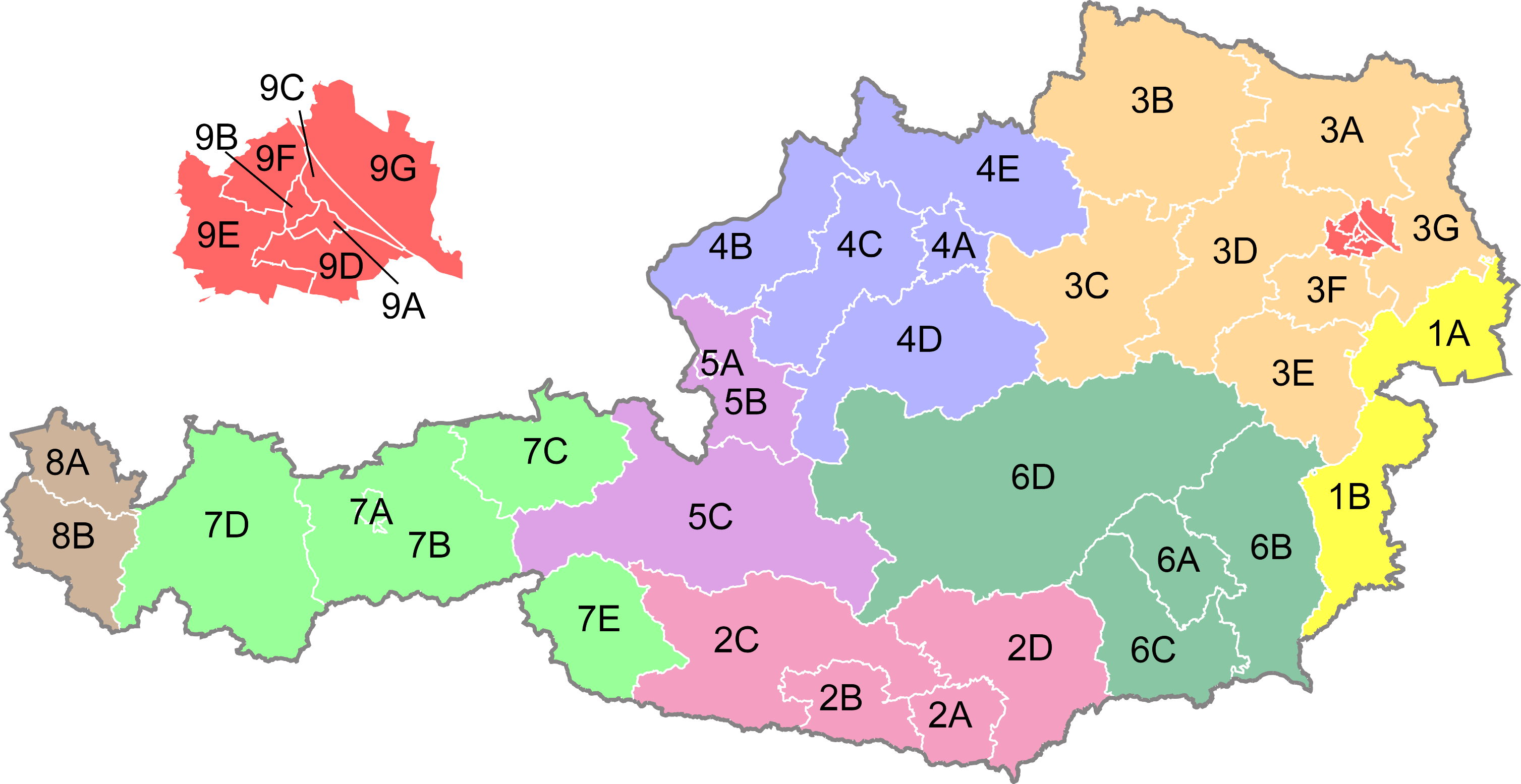
- The 39 regional electotral districts
- District: List: Landstraße; Margareten; Wieden
- State: Vienna
- Population: 185,953 (2024)
- Electorate: 107,413 (2019)
- Area: 11 km^{2} (2023)

Current Electoral District
- Created: 1994
- Seats: List: 3 (2002–present); 4 (1994–2002)
- Created from: Vienna

Vienna Inner South (German: Wien Innen-Süd), also known as Electoral District 9A (German: Wahlkreis 9A), is one of the 39 multi-member regional electoral districts of the National Council, the lower house of the Austrian Parliament, the national legislature of Austria. The electoral district was created in 1992 when electoral regulations were amended to add regional electoral districts to the existing state-wide electoral districts and came into being at the following legislative election in 1994. It consists of the districts of Landstraße, Margareten and Wieden in the city-state of Vienna. The electoral district currently elects three of the 183 members of the National Council using the open party-list proportional representation electoral system. At the 2019 legislative election the constituency had 107,413 registered electors.

== History ==
Vienna Inner South was one 43 regional electoral districts (regionalwahlkreise) established by the "National Council Electoral Regulations 1992" (Nationalrats-Wahlordnung 1992) passed by the National Council in 1992. It consisted of the districts of Landstraße, Margareten and Wieden in the city-state of Vienna. The district was initially allocated four seats in May 1993. Electoral regulations require the allocation of seats amongst the electoral districts to be recalculated following each national census and in September 2002 the number of seats allocated to Vienna Inner South was reduced to three based on the population as at the 2001 national census.

== Electoral system ==
Vienna Inner South currently elects three of the 183 members of the National Council using the open party-list proportional representation electoral system. The allocation of seats is carried out in three stages. In the first stage, seats are allocated to parties (lists) at the regional level using a state-wide Hare quota (wahlzahl) (valid votes in the state divided by the number of seats in the state). In the second stage, seats are allocated to parties at the state/provincial level using the state-wide Hare quota (any seats won by the party at the regional stage are subtracted from the party's state seats). In the third and final stage, seats are allocated to parties at the federal/national level using the D'Hondt method (any seats won by the party at the regional and state stages are subtracted from the party's federal seats). Only parties that reach the 4% national threshold, or have won a seat at the regional stage, compete for seats at the state and federal stages.

Electors may cast one preferential vote for individual candidates at the regional, state and federal levels. Split-ticket voting (panachage), or voting for more than one candidate at each level, is not permitted and will result in the ballot paper being invalidated. At the regional level, candidates must receive preferential votes amounting to at least 14% of the valid votes cast for their party to over-ride the order of the party list (10% and 7% respectively for the state and federal levels). Prior to April 2013 electors could not cast preferential votes at the federal level and the thresholds candidates needed to over-ride the party list order were higher at the regional level (half the Hare quota or 1/6 of the party votes) and state level (Hare quota).

== Election results ==
=== Summary ===
Election	Communists KPÖ+ / KPÖ			Social Democrats SPÖ			Greens GRÜNE			NEOS NEOS / LiF			People's ÖVP			Freedom FPÖ		
Election	Votes	%	Seats	Votes	%	Seats	Votes	%	Seats	Votes	%	Seats	Votes	%	Seats	Votes	%	Seats
2019	724	0.90%	0	19,040	23.76%	0	22,548	28.13%	0	9,627	12.01%	0	17,917	22.36%	0	6,786	8.47%	0
2017	1,598	1.91%	0	29,167	34.78%	1	7,012	8.36%	0	6,948	8.29%	0	18,469	22.02%	0	11,793	14.06%	0
2013	1,667	2.16%	0	20,753	26.93%	0	18,401	23.87%	0	7,695	9.98%	0	12,418	16.11%	0	10,772	13.98%	0
2008	1,186	1.45%	0	23,749	29.03%	0	18,580	22.71%	0	4,560	5.57%	0	16,471	20.14%	0	12,225	14.94%	0
2006	1,273	1.58%	0	28,003	34.75%	1	19,497	24.20%	0				19,968	24.78%	0	8,599	10.67%	0
2002	551	0.65%	0	31,048	36.61%	1	17,804	20.99%	0	1,034	1.22%	0	27,496	32.42%	1	6,297	7.43%	0
1999	786	0.98%	0	25,526	31.85%	1	11,045	13.78%	0	7,297	9.11%	0	15,792	19.71%	0	18,108	22.60%	0
1995	345	0.39%	0	33,990	38.80%	1	6,972	7.96%	0	8,331	9.51%	0	19,857	22.67%	0	17,015	19.43%	0
1994	366	0.44%	0	27,135	32.98%	1	9,842	11.96%	0	8,884	10.80%	0	16,756	20.37%	0	18,198	22.12%	0

=== Detailed ===
==== 2010s ====
===== 2019 =====
Results of the 2019 legislative election held on 29 September 2019:

Party		Votes per district				Total votes	%	Seats
Party		Land- straße	Marga- reten	Wieden	Voting card	Total votes	%	Seats
The Greens – The Green Alternative	GRÜNE	10,667	6,603	4,683	595	22,548	28.13%	0
Social Democratic Party of Austria	SPÖ	9,696	5,847	3,191	306	19,040	23.76%	0
Austrian People's Party	ÖVP	9,638	4,125	3,657	497	17,917	22.36%	0
NEOS – The New Austria	NEOS	4,899	2,257	2,123	348	9,627	12.01%	0
Freedom Party of Austria	FPÖ	3,743	1,806	1,068	169	6,786	8.47%	0
JETZT	JETZT	1,294	755	535	85	2,669	3.33%	0
KPÖ Plus	KPÖ+	355	235	122	12	724	0.90%	0
Der Wandel	WANDL	217	167	73	18	475	0.59%	0
The Beer Party	BIER	194	112	43	10	359	0.45%	0
Valid Votes		40,703	21,907	15,495	2,040	80,145	100.00%	0
Rejected Votes		248	104	80	8	440	0.55%	
Total Polled		40,951	22,011	15,575	2,048	80,585	75.02%	
Registered Electors		55,943	31,030	20,440		107,413		
Turnout		73.20%	70.93%	76.20%		75.02%		

===== 2017 =====
Results of the 2017 legislative election held on 15 October 2017:

Party		Votes per district				Total votes	%	Seats
Party		Land- straße	Marga- reten	Wieden	Voting card	Total votes	%	Seats
Social Democratic Party of Austria	SPÖ	14,546	8,879	5,196	546	29,167	34.78%	1
Austrian People's Party	ÖVP	9,693	4,130	4,111	535	18,469	22.02%	0
Freedom Party of Austria	FPÖ	6,470	3,308	1,791	224	11,793	14.06%	0
Peter Pilz List	PILZ	3,918	2,202	1,584	210	7,914	9.44%	0
The Greens – The Green Alternative	GRÜNE	3,247	2,105	1,437	223	7,012	8.36%	0
NEOS – The New Austria	NEOS	3,390	1,732	1,610	216	6,948	8.29%	0
Communist Party of Austria	KPÖ	742	527	284	45	1,598	1.91%	0
My Vote Counts!	GILT	326	210	109	15	660	0.79%	0
The Whites	WEIßE	54	19	17	2	92	0.11%	0
Free List Austria	FLÖ	28	16	11	4	59	0.07%	0
Homeless in Politics	ODP	33	16	8	0	57	0.07%	0
Socialist Left Party	SLP	22	18	6	0	46	0.05%	0
EU Exit Party	EUAUS	21	17	5	0	43	0.05%	0
Valid Votes		42,490	23,179	16,169	2,020	83,858	100.00%	1
Rejected Votes		269	167	69	6	511	0.61%	
Total Polled		42,759	23,346	16,238	2,026	84,369	77.54%	
Registered Electors		56,320	31,726	20,760		108,806		
Turnout		75.92%	73.59%	78.22%		77.54%		

The following candidates were elected:

- Party mandates - Kai Jan Krainer (SPÖ), 1,544 votes.

===== 2013 =====
Results of the 2013 legislative election held on 29 September 2013:

Party		Votes per district				Total votes	%	Seats
Party		Land- straße	Marga- reten	Wieden	Voting card	Total votes	%	Seats
Social Democratic Party of Austria	SPÖ	10,803	6,265	3,271	414	20,753	26.93%	0
The Greens – The Green Alternative	GRÜNE	8,764	5,287	3,858	492	18,401	23.87%	0
Austrian People's Party	ÖVP	6,310	2,683	2,971	454	12,418	16.11%	0
Freedom Party of Austria	FPÖ	5,735	3,201	1,605	231	10,772	13.98%	0
NEOS – The New Austria	NEOS	3,875	1,767	1,785	268	7,695	9.98%	0
Team Stronach	FRANK	1,357	661	488	54	2,560	3.32%	0
Alliance for the Future of Austria	BZÖ	904	411	298	59	1,672	2.17%	0
Communist Party of Austria	KPÖ	753	546	328	40	1,667	2.16%	0
Pirate Party of Austria	PIRAT	423	277	144	23	867	1.12%	0
Der Wandel	WANDL	81	53	23	1	158	0.21%	0
Socialist Left Party	SLP	45	41	22	2	110	0.14%	0
Valid Votes		39,050	21,192	14,793	2,038	77,073	100.00%	0
Rejected Votes		516	261	135	16	928	1.19%	
Total Polled		39,566	21,453	14,928	2,054	78,001	70.54%	
Registered Electors		57,176	32,638	20,762		110,576		
Turnout		69.20%	65.73%	71.90%		70.54%		

==== 2000s ====
===== 2008 =====
Results of the 2008 legislative election held on 28 September 2008:

Party		Votes per district				Total votes	%	Seats
Party		Land- straße	Marga- reten	Wieden	Voting card	Total votes	%	Seats
Social Democratic Party of Austria	SPÖ	11,859	7,140	3,498	1,252	23,749	29.03%	0
The Greens – The Green Alternative	GRÜNE	8,388	5,228	3,902	1,062	18,580	22.71%	0
Austrian People's Party	ÖVP	7,996	3,298	3,733	1,444	16,471	20.14%	0
Freedom Party of Austria	FPÖ	6,238	3,627	1,704	656	12,225	14.94%	0
Liberal Forum	LiF	2,110	1,168	1,048	234	4,560	5.57%	0
Alliance for the Future of Austria	BZÖ	1,649	865	575	268	3,357	4.10%	0
Communist Party of Austria	KPÖ	573	352	199	62	1,186	1.45%	0
Fritz Dinkhauser List – Citizens' Forum Tyrol	FRITZ	293	152	99	50	594	0.73%	0
Independent Citizens' Initiative Save Austria	RETTÖ	223	109	73	32	437	0.53%	0
The Christians	DC	172	54	55	16	297	0.36%	0
Animal Rights Party	TRP	101	59	35	11	206	0.25%	0
Left	LINKE	56	52	21	9	138	0.17%	0
Valid Votes		39,658	22,104	14,942	5,096	81,800	100.00%	0
Rejected Votes		588	325	153	61	1,127	1.36%	
Total Polled		40,246	22,429	15,095	5,157	82,927	73.67%	
Registered Electors		57,747	33,484	21,327		112,558		
Turnout		69.69%	66.98%	70.78%		73.67%		

===== 2006 =====
Results of the 2006 legislative election held on 1 October 2006:

Party		Votes per district				Total votes	%	Seats
Party		Land- straße	Marga- reten	Wieden	Voting card	Total votes	%	Seats
Social Democratic Party of Austria	SPÖ	13,193	8,012	3,938	2,860	28,003	34.75%	1
Austrian People's Party	ÖVP	8,654	3,718	3,872	3,724	19,968	24.78%	0
The Greens – The Green Alternative	GRÜNE	8,147	4,809	3,757	2,784	19,497	24.20%	0
Freedom Party of Austria	FPÖ	4,116	2,430	1,221	832	8,599	10.67%	0
Hans-Peter Martin's List	MATIN	655	333	256	210	1,454	1.80%	0
Alliance for the Future of Austria	BZÖ	573	338	232	161	1,304	1.62%	0
Communist Party of Austria	KPÖ	590	339	204	140	1,273	1.58%	0
EU Withdrawal – Neutral Free Austria	NFÖ	136	59	45	21	261	0.32%	0
Socialist Left Party	SLP	114	61	29	11	215	0.27%	0
Valid Votes		36,178	20,099	13,554	10,743	80,574	100.00%	1
Rejected Votes		399	244	138	91	872	1.07%	
Total Polled		36,577	20,343	13,692	10,834	81,446	73.00%	
Registered Electors		57,270	33,142	21,164		111,576		
Turnout		63.87%	61.38%	64.69%		73.00%		

The following candidates were elected:

- Party mandates - Kai Jan Krainer (SPÖ), 2,272 votes.

===== 2002 =====
Results of the 2002 legislative election held on 24 November 2002:

Party		Votes per district				Total votes	%	Seats
Party		Land- straße	Marga- reten	Wieden	Voting card	Total votes	%	Seats
Social Democratic Party of Austria	SPÖ	15,163	8,922	4,583	2,380	31,048	36.61%	1
Austrian People's Party	ÖVP	12,855	5,999	5,373	3,269	27,496	32.42%	1
The Greens – The Green Alternative	GRÜNE	7,653	4,690	3,710	1,751	17,804	20.99%	0
Freedom Party of Austria	FPÖ	3,019	1,842	993	443	6,297	7.43%	0
Liberal Forum	LiF	467	300	184	83	1,034	1.22%	0
Communist Party of Austria	KPÖ	266	168	86	31	551	0.65%	0
Socialist Left Party	SLP	178	127	60	11	376	0.44%	0
The Democrats		105	57	29	9	200	0.24%	0
Valid Votes		39,706	22,105	15,018	7,977	84,806	100.00%	2
Rejected Votes		369	216	125	53	763	0.89%	
Total Polled		40,075	22,321	15,143	8,030	85,569	77.98%	
Registered Electors		56,546	32,242	20,951		109,739		
Turnout		70.87%	69.23%	72.28%		77.98%		

The following candidates were elected:

- Party mandates - Alfred Finz (ÖVP), 2,310 votes; and Kai Jan Krainer (SPÖ), 2,323 votes.

Alfred Finz (ÖVP) resigned on 4 March 2003 and was replaced by Ulrike Baumgartner-Gabitzer (ÖVP).

==== 1990s ====
===== 1999 =====
Results of the 1999 legislative election held on 3 October 1999:

Party		Votes per district				Total votes	%	Seats
Party		Land- straße	Marga- reten	Wieden	Voting card	Total votes	%	Seats
Social Democratic Party of Austria	SPÖ	11,968	7,247	3,611	2,700	25,526	31.85%	1
Freedom Party of Austria	FPÖ	8,307	4,995	2,795	2,011	18,108	22.60%	0
Austrian People's Party	ÖVP	6,801	3,044	3,093	2,854	15,792	19.71%	0
The Greens – The Green Alternative	GRÜNE	4,663	2,755	2,183	1,444	11,045	13.78%	0
Liberal Forum	LiF	2,999	1,801	1,548	949	7,297	9.11%	0
The Independents	DU	507	330	197	99	1,133	1.41%	0
Communist Party of Austria	KPÖ	363	237	132	54	786	0.98%	0
No to NATO and EU – Neutral Austria Citizens' Initiative	NEIN	230	106	63	48	447	0.56%	0
Valid Votes		35,838	20,515	13,622	10,159	80,134	100.00%	1
Rejected Votes		443	294	123	74	934	1.15%	
Total Polled		36,281	20,809	13,745	10,233	81,068	73.61%	
Registered Electors		56,212	32,673	21,254		110,139		
Turnout		64.54%	63.69%	64.67%		73.61%		

The following candidates were elected:

- Party mandates - Kurt Heindl (SPÖ), 1,411 votes.

===== 1995 =====
Results of the 1995 legislative election held on 17 December 1995:

Party		Votes per district				Total votes	%	Seats
Party		Land- straße	Marga- reten	Wieden	Voting card	Total votes	%	Seats
Social Democratic Party of Austria	SPÖ	16,827	9,827	5,220	2,116	33,990	38.80%	1
Austrian People's Party	ÖVP	9,429	4,212	4,293	1,923	19,857	22.67%	0
Freedom Party of Austria	FPÖ	8,157	5,017	2,764	1,077	17,015	19.43%	0
Liberal Forum	LiF	3,889	2,142	1,684	616	8,331	9.51%	0
The Greens – The Green Alternative	GRÜNE	3,199	1,904	1,338	531	6,972	7.96%	0
No – Civic Action Group; Against the Sale of Austria	NEIN	481	248	180	51	960	1.10%	0
Communist Party of Austria	KPÖ	178	95	61	11	345	0.39%	0
Natural Law Party	ÖNP	55	38	21	8	122	0.14%	0
Valid Votes		42,215	23,483	15,561	6,333	87,592	100.00%	1
Rejected Votes		600	366	159	35	1,160	1.31%	
Total Polled		42,815	23,849	15,720	6,368	88,752	78.58%	
Registered Electors		58,449	33,133	21,361		112,943		
Turnout		73.25%	71.98%	73.59%		78.58%		

The following candidates were elected:

- Party mandates - Kurt Heindl (SPÖ), 1,614 votes.

===== 1994 =====
Results of the 1994 legislative election held on 9 October 1994:

Party		Votes per district				Total votes	%	Seats
Party		Land- straße	Marga- reten	Wieden	Voting card	Total votes	%	Seats
Social Democratic Party of Austria	SPÖ	13,129	7,566	3,998	2,442	27,135	32.98%	1
Freedom Party of Austria	FPÖ	8,326	5,180	2,832	1,860	18,198	22.12%	0
Austrian People's Party	ÖVP	7,472	3,395	3,323	2,566	16,756	20.37%	0
The Greens – The Green Alternative	GRÜNE	4,314	2,584	1,955	989	9,842	11.96%	0
Liberal Forum	LiF	4,018	2,110	1,751	1,005	8,884	10.80%	0
No – Civic Action Group; Against the Sale of Austria	NEIN	386	193	155	95	829	1.01%	0
Communist Party of Austria	KPÖ	182	86	68	30	366	0.44%	0
Natural Law Party	ÖNP	66	34	23	5	128	0.16%	0
Citizen Greens Austria – Free Democrats	BGÖ	28	19	14	8	69	0.08%	0
United Greens Austria – List Adi Pinter	VGÖ	31	13	16	3	63	0.08%	0
Valid Votes		37,952	21,180	14,135	9,003	82,270	100.00%	1
Rejected Votes		425	262	126	73	886	1.07%	
Total Polled		38,377	21,442	14,261	9,076	83,156	72.46%	
Registered Electors		59,185	33,830	21,750		114,765		
Turnout		64.84%	63.38%	65.57%		72.46%		

The following candidates were elected:

- Party mandates - Kurt Heindl (SPÖ), 2,892 votes.
