= Viktor Dobronravov =

Russian actor (born 1983)

- Виктор Добронравов
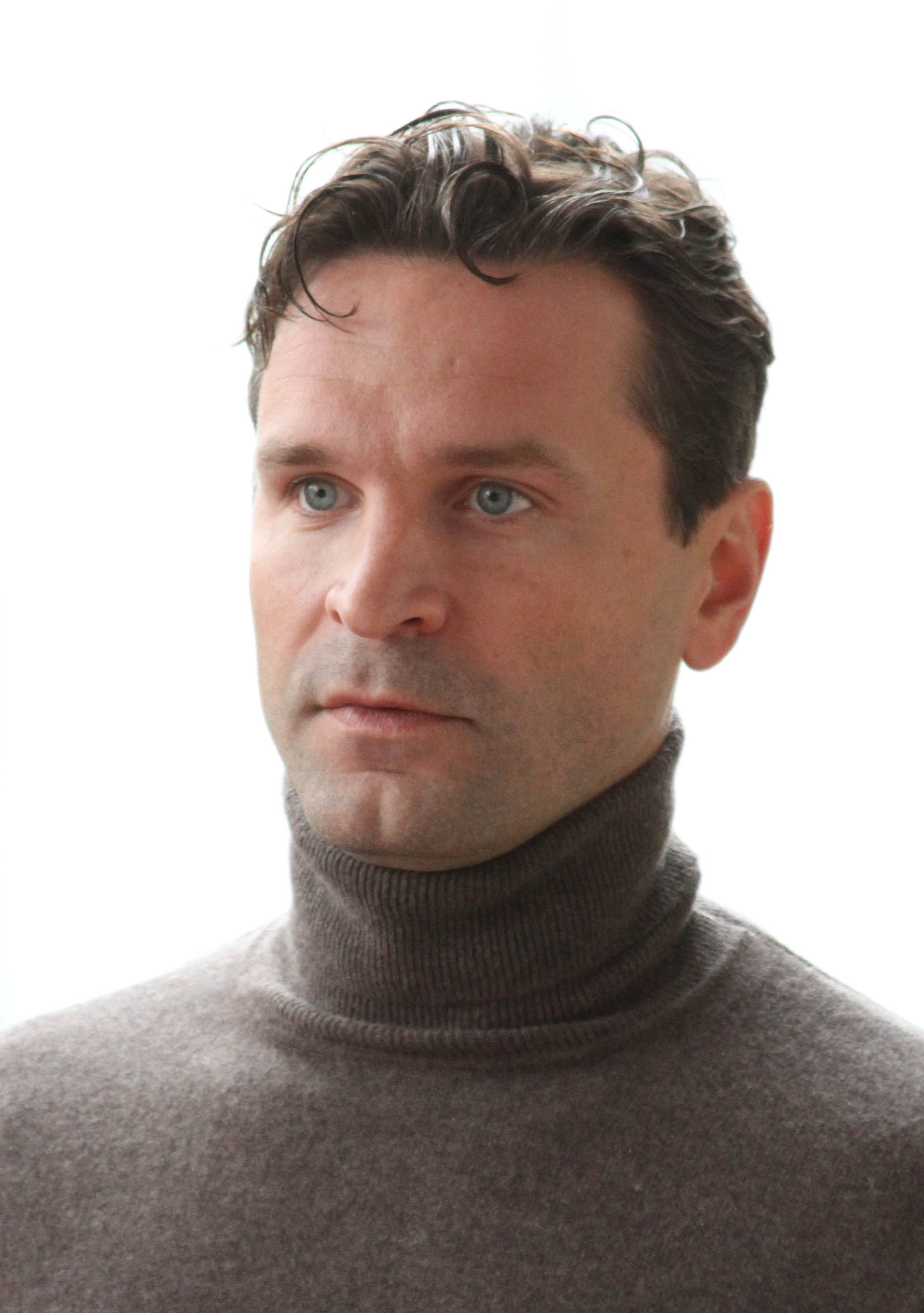
- Born: Viktor Fyodorovich Dobronravov; 8 March 1983; Taganrog, Rostov Oblast, RSFSR, USSR
- Citizenship: Soviet Union (until 1991); Russia
- Occupations: Actor; Singer
- Years active: 2004–present
- Father: Fyodor Dobronravov
- Relatives: Ivan Dobronravov (brother)
- Awards: Merited Artist of the Russian Federation (2018)

Viktor Fyodorovich Dobronravov (Russian: Виктор Фёдорович Добронра́вов; born 8 March 1983) is a Russian theatre actor, dubbing professional, musician, and leader of the Carpet Quartet group. In 2018, he was named a Merited Artist of the Russian Federation. He has appeared in more than 70 films.

== Biography ==
=== Early life ===
Viktor Dobronravov was born in Taganrog, Rostov Oblast, Russian SFSR, Soviet Union (now Russia).

== Personal life ==
He is the older brother of Russian actor Ivan Dobronravov. He is the son of Russian actor Fyodor Dobronravov and kindergarten teacher Irina Dobronravova.

He has been married since 23 March 2010. He and his wife have two daughters.

== Selected filmography ==
=== Film ===
List of film credits
Year	Title	Role	Notes
2005-06	Not Born Beautiful	Korotkov	
2018	T-34	Stepan Vasilyonok	
2019	Soldier Boy	Commander Kuznetsov	
2020	Streltsov	Artyomov	
2020	Fire	Pyotr Velichuk	
2021	A Dog Named Palma	Vyacheslav Lazarev	
2021	Svaty	Young Ivan Budko	
2022	The One	Knyazev	
2023	Forgotten Experiment	Ethan Blake	
2023	The Palace	episode	
2024	Onegin	Yevgeny Onegin	
2025	Catherine the Great	Alexey Orlov	
2025	Palma 2	Vyacheslav Lazarev	
2026	Angels of War	Captain Mikhail Kholin	
2026	Seven Versts Before Dawn	Ivan	
2026	Rise of the Empire	Semyon	
