= Elena Lyadova =

Russian actress (born 1980)

- Елена Лядова
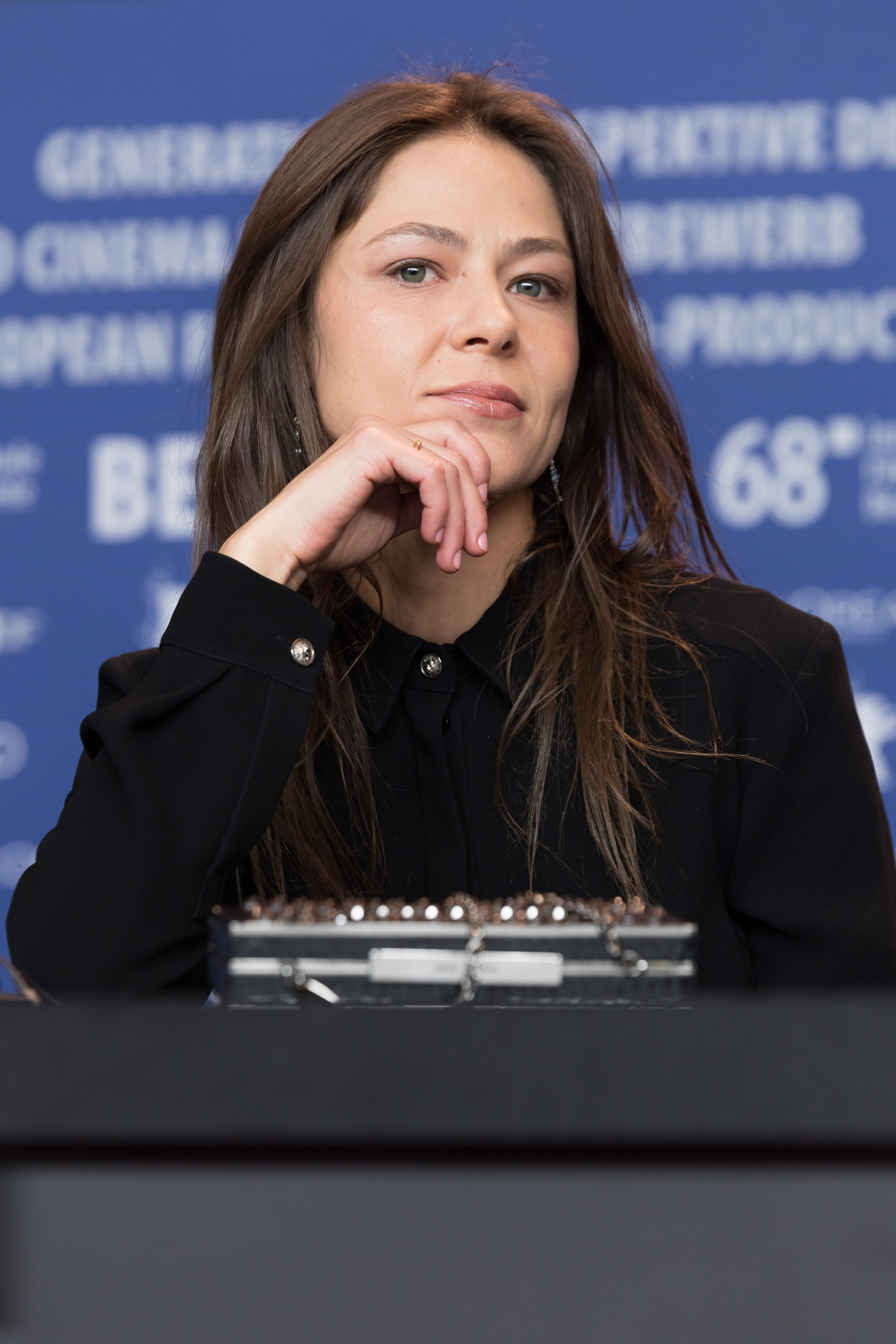
- Elena Lyadova at the press conference of Dovlatov at Berlinale 2018
- Born: Elena Igorevna Lyadova; 25 December 1980 (age 45); Morshansk, Tambov Oblast, Russian SFSR, Soviet Union
- Occupation: Actress
- Years active: 2002–present
- Spouse: Vladimir Vdovichenkov
- Awards: Nika Award - 2011, 2014, 2015 Golden Eagle Award - 2012, 2014, 2015

Elena Igorevna Lyadova (Russian: Еле́на И́горевна Ля́дова; born 25 December 1980) is a Russian actress. In 2002, she graduated from Mikhail Shchepkin Higher Theatre School in Moscow, Russia. Her film credits include Elena (2011), The Geographer Drank His Globe Away (2013), Leviathan (2014) and Orlean (2015).

== Biography ==
Elena Lyadova was born in on 25 December 1980 in Morshansk, Tambov Oblast. When Elena turned six, the family moved to Odintsovo, Moscow Oblast.

She graduated from the Higher Theatre School named after MS Shchepkin in 2002 and was accepted into the troupe of the Moscow Theatre for Young Audiences.

== Career ==
Lyadova's career in cinema began in 2005, with the Golden George winning film Dreaming of Space by Alexei Uchitel.

In 2005, she had roles in Ekaterina Shagalova's melodrama Pavlov's Dog and in Andrei Proshkin's comedy Soldier's Decameron.

Elena acted in the 2009, television series The Brothers Karamazov by Yuri Moroz, based on the novel of the same name by Fyodor Dostoyevsky. In the film, Elena played the scandalous and vicious Grushenka.

In 2012, she was awarded the Best Actress Golden Eagle and Nika for her role as the daughter of the main character in Andrey Zvyagintsev's Elena. Two years later, she again received the Best Actress Golden Eagle and Nika for her role as the wife of the protagonist in Alexander Veledinsky's movie The Geographer Drank His Globe Away.

Creative collaboration of Elena Lyadova with Vadim Perelman continued in 2015: she starred in the dramatic miniseries Treason. The series tells about the fate of people whose spouses are unfaithful. The picture won the award of the Association of Producers of Cinema and Television in the nomination "Best miniseries".

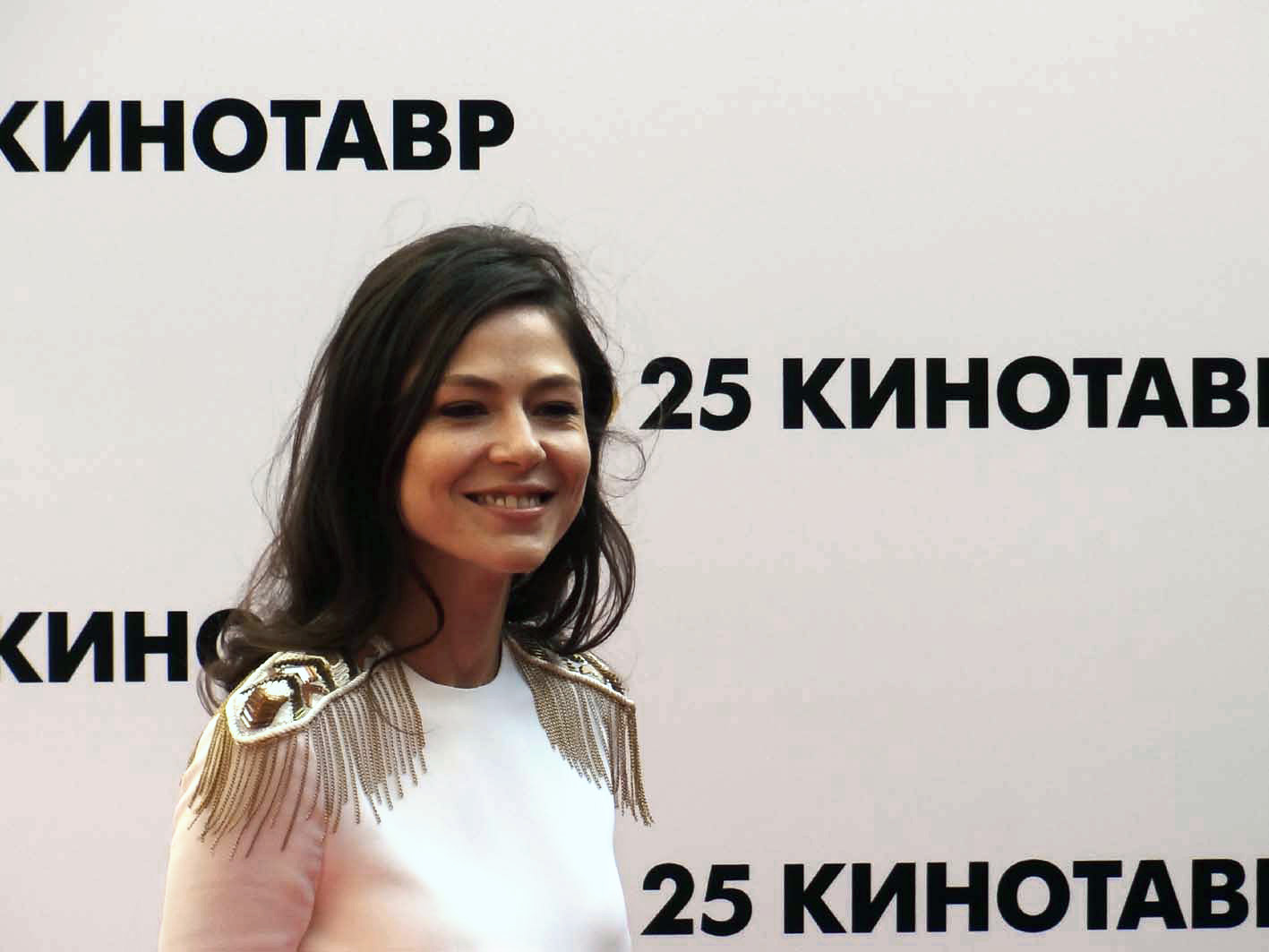
Elena Lyadova at the opening ceremony of the festival "Kinotavr-2014" in Sochi.

In October 2013, on the TV channel Russia 1 premiered a detective historical miniseries by Vadim Perelman Ashes, in which Elena performed one of the main roles.

In 2015, the actress received the Silver George for the role of eccentric and promiscuous hairdresser Lidka in the black comedy film by Andrei Proshkin Orlean.

She played the supporting role of a young editor in the 2018 biographical drama film Dovlatov which was screened at the 68th Berlin International Film Festival.

== Personal life ==
During the filming of Soldier's Decameron (2005) she became romantically involved with actor Aleksandr Yatsenko, with whom she lived for seven years.

In 2015, she married actor Vladimir Vdovichenkov.

== Filmography ==
=== Film ===
Year	Title	Role	Notes
2005	Dreaming of Space	Rimma	
2005	Pavlov's Dog	Ksysha	
2005	Soldier's Decameron (ru)	Marina	
2009	Tambourine, Drum (ru)	friend	
2011	Elena	Katerina	
2012	Solo saxophone	Vika	
2013	The Geographer Drank His Globe Away	Nadia	
2014	Leviathan	Lilya Sergeyeva	
2015	Orlean	Lidka	
2016	Day to ...		
2018	Dovlatov	young editor	
2018	Frontier		
2025	Rowing for Gold	Vera Savrimovich	

=== Television ===
Year	Title	Role	Notes
2007	Lenin's Testament	Galina Koval	TV series
2008	Protection	Tatiana Kalitina	TV series
2009	The Brothers Karamazov	Grushenka	TV series
2009	Return of Sinbad	Elya Shakhova	TV series
2009	Disappeared	Galka	Mini-series
2009	Lyubka	Lyubka	TV
2009	Moscow courtyard	Svetka	TV series
2010	When Ledum bloom	Anna Sedova	TV
2010	Rat	Natalia Sorokina-Lefabe	TV
2010	Blizzard	Masha	Mini-series
2010	Captivity passion	Mariya (Mura) Zakrevskaya	TV
2011	Heartbeat	Nina Ilina	Mini-series
2011	I'll wait	Klava Sintsova	Mini-series
2012	Collectors	Vera	TV series
2012	Separation	Rada	TV series
2013	Lucky	Irina Boyarova	TV
2013	Ashes (ru)	Rita	TV series
2015	Treason (ru)	Asya	TV series
