= Onegin (2024 film) =

- Russian cinema poster
- Directed by: Sarik Andreasyan
- Written by: Aleksey Gravitskiy
- Based on: Eugene Onegin by Alexander Pushkin
- Produced by: Sarik Andreasyan; Gevond Andreasyan; Ilya Shuvalov; Yekaterina Shuvalova; Maria Naumidis
- Starring: Viktor Dobronravov; Denis Prytkov; Yelizaveta Moryak; Tatyana Sabinova; Alyona Khmelnitskaya; Tatyana Lyutaeva
- Narrated by: Vladimir Vdovichenkov
- Cinematography: Kirill Zotkin
- Edited by: Georgy Isaakyan
- Music by: Georgy Zheryakov
- Production company: K.B.A. (transl. "Andreasyan Brothers Film Company")
- Distributed by: Cinema Atmosphere Film Distribution
- Release date: March 7, 2024 (Russia)
- Running time: 141 minutes
- Country: Russia
- Language: Russian
- Budget: ₽500 million
- Box office: ₽787 million; $8.8 million

Onegin (Russian: Онегин) is a 2024 Russian historical romance film directed by Sarik Andreasyan, an adaptation of the novel in verse Eugene Onegin by Alexander Pushkin. The film stars Viktor Dobronravov, Denis Prytkov, Yelizaveta Moryak, Tatyana Sabinova, Alyona Khmelnitskaya, and Tatyana Lyutaeva in supporting roles.

Onegin was theatrically released in Russia on March 7, 2024, by Cinema Atmosphere Film Distribution.

== Plot ==
Yevgeny Onegin lives a luxurious city life, attending balls, receptions, theater premieres, and other amusements, but he eventually grows disillusioned. Upon learning of his uncle's illness, he travels to the countryside, only to find that his uncle has died, leaving him as the sole heir to a large estate. Now financially secure, Onegin avoids interacting with the local residents, who soon regard him as eccentric. He lives in relative solitude until he meets his young, enthusiastic neighbor, Lensky, who has recently returned from abroad. Lensky introduces Onegin to the sisters Tatyana and Olga Larina, who live on a nearby estate.

== Cast ==
- Viktor Dobronravov as Eugene Onegin (also tr. Yevgeny Onegin)
- Denis Prytkov as Vladimir Lensky
- Yelizaveta "Liza" Moryak as Tatiana Larina (also tr. Tatyana Larina)
- Tatyana Sabinova as Olga Larina
- Alyona Khmelnitskaya as Praskovya Larina, Olga Larina and Tatiana Larina's mother
- Tatyana Lyutaeva as Princess Alina
- Olga Tumaykina as Madame Skotinina
- Oleg Kamenshchikov as a salesman
- Vladimir Vdovichenkov as narrator (author's voice)
- Aleksandr Yatsko as Prince
- Svetlana Nemolyaeva as Nannya Filipyevna, Tatiana Larina's nanny
- Sergey Stepin as Prokhor
- Aleksey Grishin as Zaretsky
- Yuri Chulkov as Flyanov, retired adviser
- Karen Badalov as Guillot, a Frenchman
- Alina Goldenberg as Larina's maid
- Vadim Andreyev as Pustyakov, Larina's neighbor
- Aleksandr Razbash as Gvozdin, Larina's neighbor

== Production ==
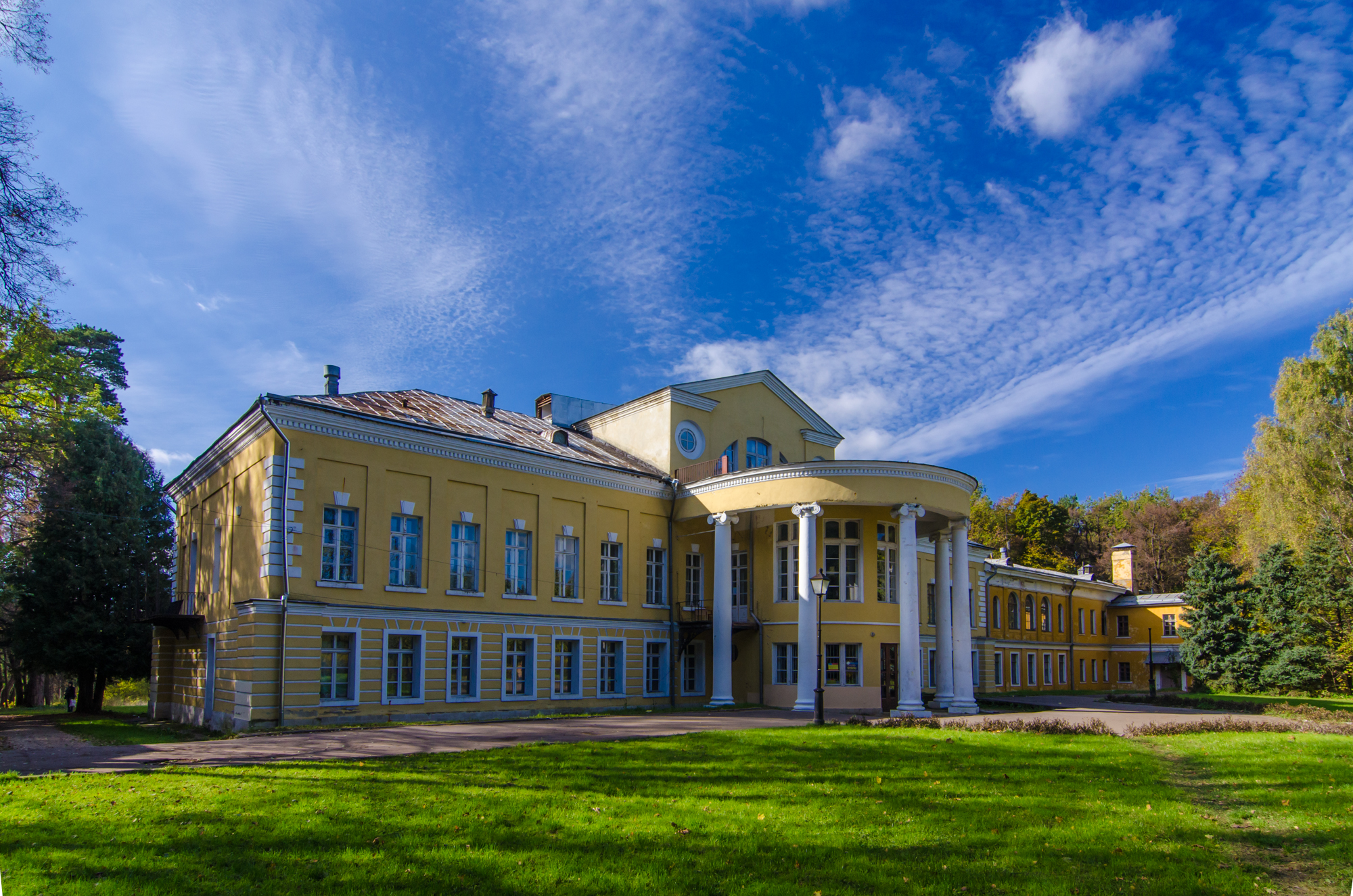
The Sukhanov estate in the village, Leninsky District, Moscow Oblast.

The director did not want to use a large number of special effects, so it was decided to make the filming as real as possible and move it to places that Pushkin himself actually visited. Filming took place in 2023 in Moscow and Saint Petersburg, among the locations you can see the Pevchesky Bridge, the Sukhanovo estate, and the Great Gatchina Palace.

According to Sarik Andreasyan, it turned out to be impossible to stylize the poetry of Alexander Sergeyevich Pushkin under prose, because the characters of the novel speak a language "unaffordable for the modern ear", and the screenwriters found a solution thanks to which the poems will sound natural in the frame.
