= Brattsevo =

Coordinates: 55.8485°N 37.3975°E

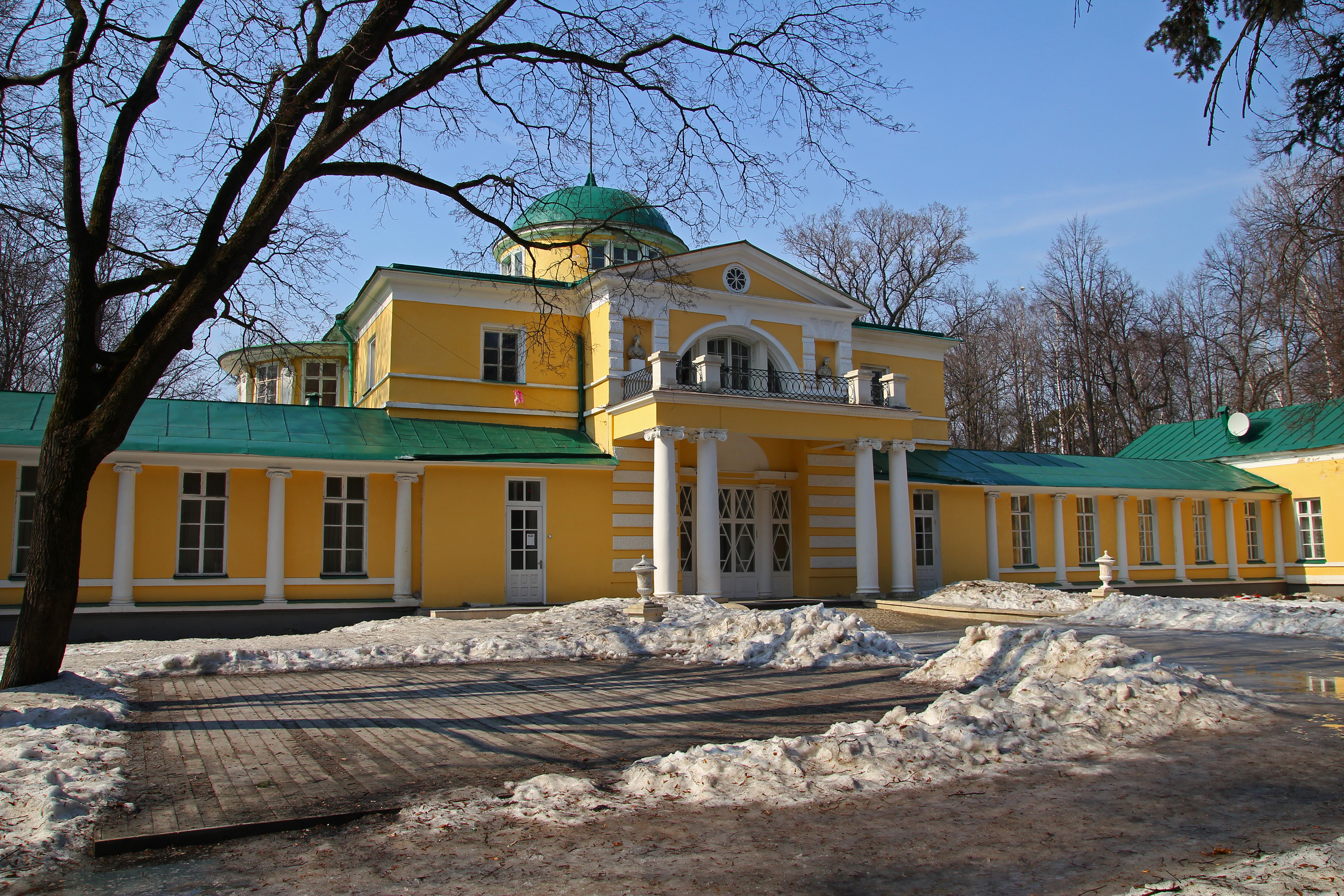
Brattsevo

Brattsevo (Russian: Бра́тцево) is an area in Yuzhnoye Tushino District of North-Western Administrative Okrug of Moscow, Russia; formerly a country estate and a village. It is located near the confluence of the Bratovka and the Skhodnya Rivers.

== History ==
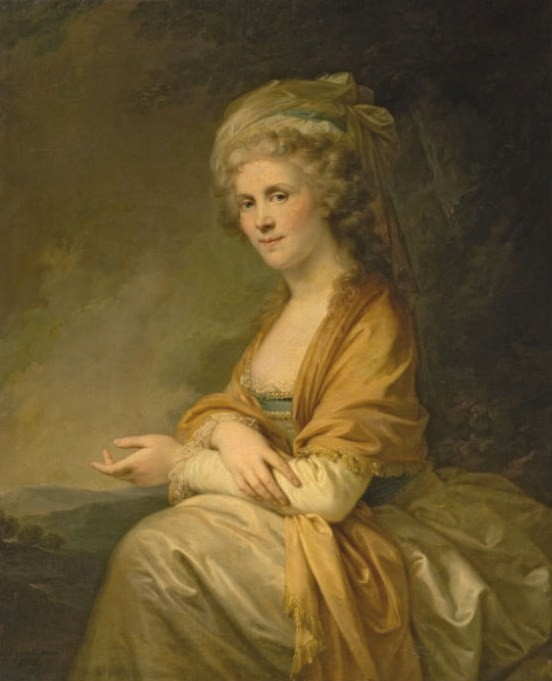
Countess Catherine Stroganova

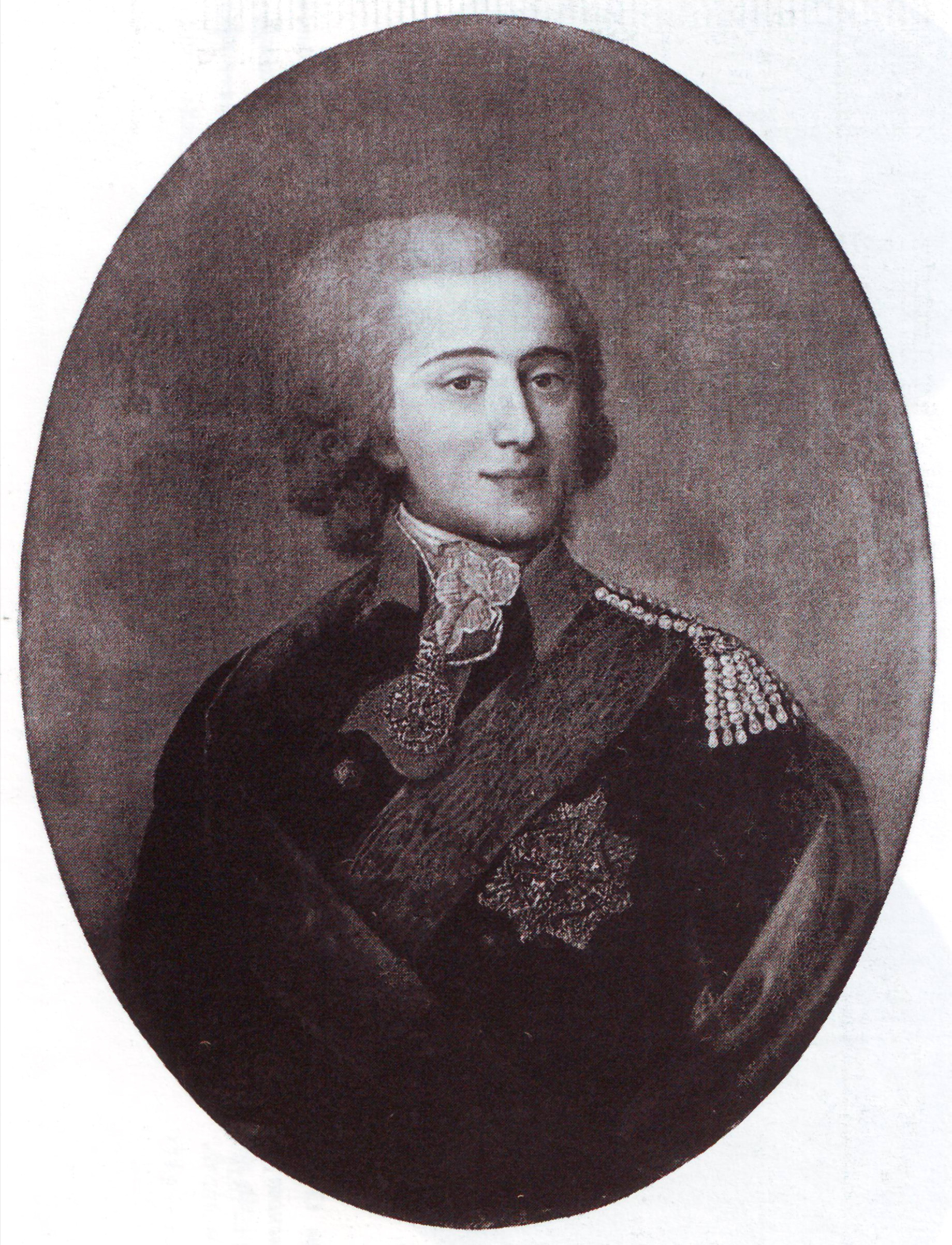
Ivan Rimsky-Korsakov

For the first time mentioned in a last will dated 1565. From 1657 the village owned by a boyar Bogdan Khitrovo, who built there stone church of Intercession of the Virgin, preserved to our time. At that time (1680), in Brattsevo was 24 peasant yards and 49 residents. After the death of Khitrovo and his widow Maria Ivanovna, the village has been received by Cyril Naryshkin, relative of Peter the Great on his mother (1695).

Naryshkins owned of Brattsevo nearly a century. In 1780 the village was bought from the daughters of Cyril Naryshkin be Count Alexander Stroganoff, who immediately conveyed Brattsevo to his wife Catherine Petrovna. Soon after Count Stroganoff divorced the Countess because of her romance with Ivan Rimsky-Korsakov (former favorite of Catherine the Great), leaving Brattsevo to Catherine Petrovna. Countess Catherine P. Stroganoff lived in Brattsevo with Ivan Rimsky-Korsakov until her death (1815). After her death, Brattsevo was owned by Rimsky-Korsakov. Apparently, c. 1813 upon a picturesque hill near the village was created a complex estates and parks, existing to our time. The architect is expected to be Andrey Voronikhin, a former serf of Counts Stroganoff. Palace was built as an imitation of Villa Rotonda by Andrea Palladio. After the death of Rimsky-Korsakov (1831), Brattsevo was owned by his illegitimate son from Catherine Stroganoff, Colonel Vassily Ladomirsky. In summer 1866 in Brattsevo lived the artist Ivan Shishkin. His picture "Noon. Neighborhoods of Moscow" is based on his etudes of Brattsevo. In 1852 there were 25 peasant yards and 168 residents in Brattsevo, in 1898 - 49 yards and 209 residents. In 1888 was opened the parish school. In 1879, on the banks of Skhodnya on the site of mill, first referred to in the will in 1565, was constructed a cloth factory of Ivan Suvirov. The local farmers were not employed at this factory, as the manufacturer has wished the workers to be absolutely dependent. At this factory in 1885 occurred one of the first workers strike in Russia.

== 20th century ==
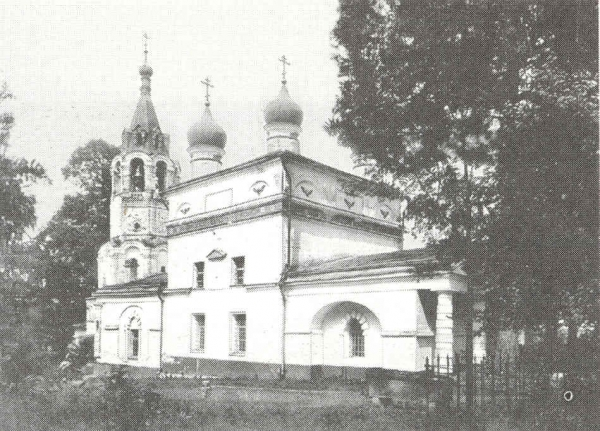
Church in Brattsevo, 1900s

The new owner of the Suvirov factory in 1915 became colonel Hutarev. After the February Revolution of 1917 a conflict happened between Hutarev and its workers. Hutarev tried to declare a lockout, but the factory committee had a factory management in their own hands. Hutarev refused to pay, while workers locked him in a shed and released him only after his wife brought the money from Moscow. In November 1917 the new conflict occurred, when in October some of the factory workers, being members of the Red Guard, took part in the passages of arms in Moscow and Hutarev refused to admit them to work after their return. As a result, he was arrested again by workers, but successfully escaped never to return again, leaving the factory under the rule of workers.

The last owner of estate was an archaeologist, director of the Imperial Historical Museum, Prince Nikolai Shcherbatov. After the revolution of 1917, he willingly transferred Brattsevo to the State, insisting, however, that it must be taken under state protection as a monument of architecture. For some time there was a museum in the palace, but soon (1922) it was closed. After that, the estate was turned into a relaxation house for Revolutionary Military Council (Revvoensoviet) and was reorganized as a sovkhoz by Revvoensoviet, by based on landowner's economy. Soon, however, the sovkhoz and the estate had been transferred to agricultural institute. In 1928 the church bell tower was demolished, in 1930 the church was closed and converted into a factory. In 1935, in the estate became a sanatorium of Main Office of Northern Sea Route (Glavsevmorput '). Subsequently, there was a relaxation house of theater union.

== Part of Moscow ==
Since 1960, Brattsevo came within the boundaries of Moscow. Remains of the village were finally demolished in 1980, and on their place was built Tushino’s Children's Hospital. In early 2000s, the wasteland outside the hospital was converted into a luxury cottage accommodation.
