= Andrey Andreev (actor) =

Russian actor (born 2010)

- Андрей Андреев
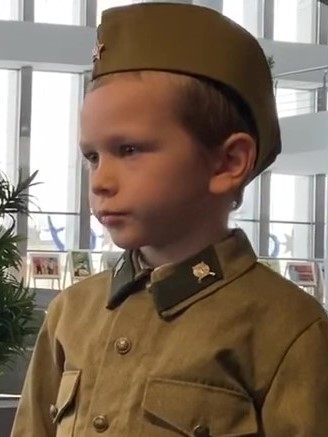
- Andreev in the role of Sergei Aleshkov, 2019
- Born: Andrey Igorevich Andreev; 18 October 2010 (age 15); Moscow, Russia
- Occupations: Choir singer, actor
- Years active: 2015–present

Andrey Igorevich Andreev (Russian: Андрей Игоревич Андреев; born 18 October 2010) is a Russian teen actor. He is best known for his title role as Sergei Aleshkov in the film Soldier Boy (2019).

== Early life and education ==
Andrey Andreev was born on 18 October 2010 in Moscow. He was raised in a military family. Andreev attended the Central Music School of the Moscow Conservatory.

== Career ==
Andreev entered the Big Children's Choir in 2015. A year later, his parents signed him up for the Young Actor's Musical Theatre. There, he became a member of the theater's troupe and soon began to play leading roles in performances. His first major role in a theatrical was as Vasya in "In the Nursery" (В детской).

Andreev was chosen to play as Sergei Aleshkov in the film Soldier Boy. Andreev, who was five years old at that time, beat out more than 400 applicants to win the role. According to the director of the film, Andreev impressed the much older actors on site after correcting all of the microphones on the set of the film. He also managed to memorize the entire 100-page script of the movie, despite being asked to remember only one or two scenes for the film. Andreev also managed to retain his body size after the director of the movie announced that the shooting of the film was postponed. He won various prizes and awards in film festivals for his performance in Soldier Boy.

Andreev's performance in the movie landed him some roles in other movies. He played in the melodrama Life — is... as well as the romantic comedy film Batya. He will star as Chuk in the upcoming film Chuk and Gek.

Aside from being an actor and a choir singer, Andreev also competes in figure skating. He won third place at a junior figure skating competition in 2019.

== Filmography ==
Year	Title	Role	Notes
2019	Soldier Boy	Sergei Aleshkov	
2019	Happiness Is... Part 2	Lyosha	
2021	The King's Man	Yusupov Guest #4	
2021	Batya	Maksim	
2022	The Adventures of Chuck and Huck	Chuck (also tr. Chuk)	Based on Chuk and Gek by Arkady Gaidar
2025	Batya 2. The Grandfather	Maksim	
