= Legal Advisor =

A Legal Advisor is a person who provides legal advice, often in an official capacity. Government officials that qualify as lawyers (jurist) in certain countries can get the title Legal Adviser.

Legal Advisor, as a proper noun, may refer to:

- Legal Advisor (Office for the Administrative Review of the Detention of Enemy Combatants), the legal adviser to the Office for the Administrative Review of Detained Enemy Combatants in the United States
- Legal Adviser of the United States Department of State, a position in the federal government of the United States
- Legal advisor (Poland), a profession recognized in the Polish legal system
