= Vladimir Vdovichenkov =

Russian actor (born 1971)

- Владимир Вдовиченков
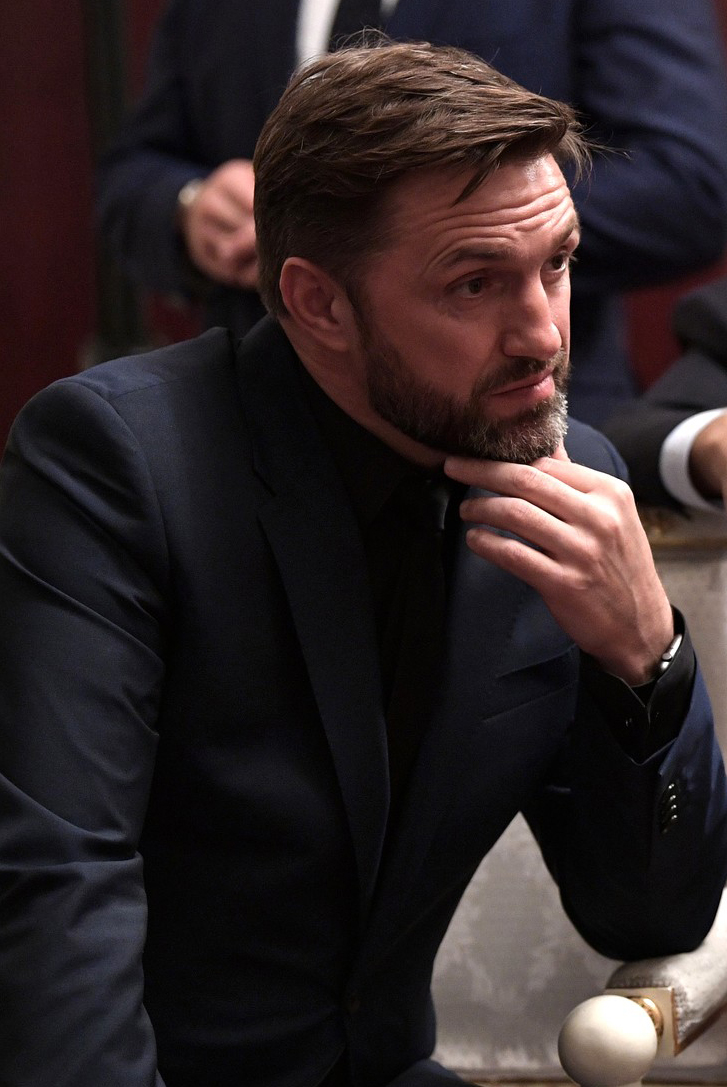
- Vladimir Vdovichenkov at the meeting of President Vladimir Putin with the crew of the film Salyut-7 (2017).
- Born: Vladimir Vladimirovich Vdovichenkov; 13 August 1971 (age 54); Gusev, Kaliningrad Oblast, Russian SFSR, Soviet Union
- Occupation: Actor
- Years active: 1997–present
- Awards: Honored Artist of the Russian Federation (2012)
- Website: vdovichenkov.ru

Vladimir Vladimirovich Vdovichenkov (Russian: Владимир Владимирович Вдовиченков; born 13 August 1971) is a Russian theater and screen actor known for his roles in Brigada (2002), Leviathan (2014), Bummer (2003) and Salyut 7 (2017).

== Early life and education ==
Vdovichenkov was born in Gusev, Kaliningrad Oblast, Russian RSFSR, Soviet Union. He pursued boxing while at school. After graduating from 42nd Kronstadt Nautical School in 1989, he served four years in the Northern Fleet and the Baltic Fleet. He worked as a waiter while taking preparatory acting courses. As a student he appeared in music videos and commercials.

== Career ==
In 2000, While Vdovichenkov was a fourth-year student at the Gerasimov Institute of Cinematography, director Alexey Sidorov cast him in a main role in the crime television series Brigada. This brought him fame in Russia and other Russian-speaking countries. In 2001, Vdovichenkov graduated from Gerasimov Institute of Cinematography. He has performed at the Vakhtangov State Academic Theater since 2002.

In 2015, he married Elena Lyadova – his co-star in Leviathan (2014).

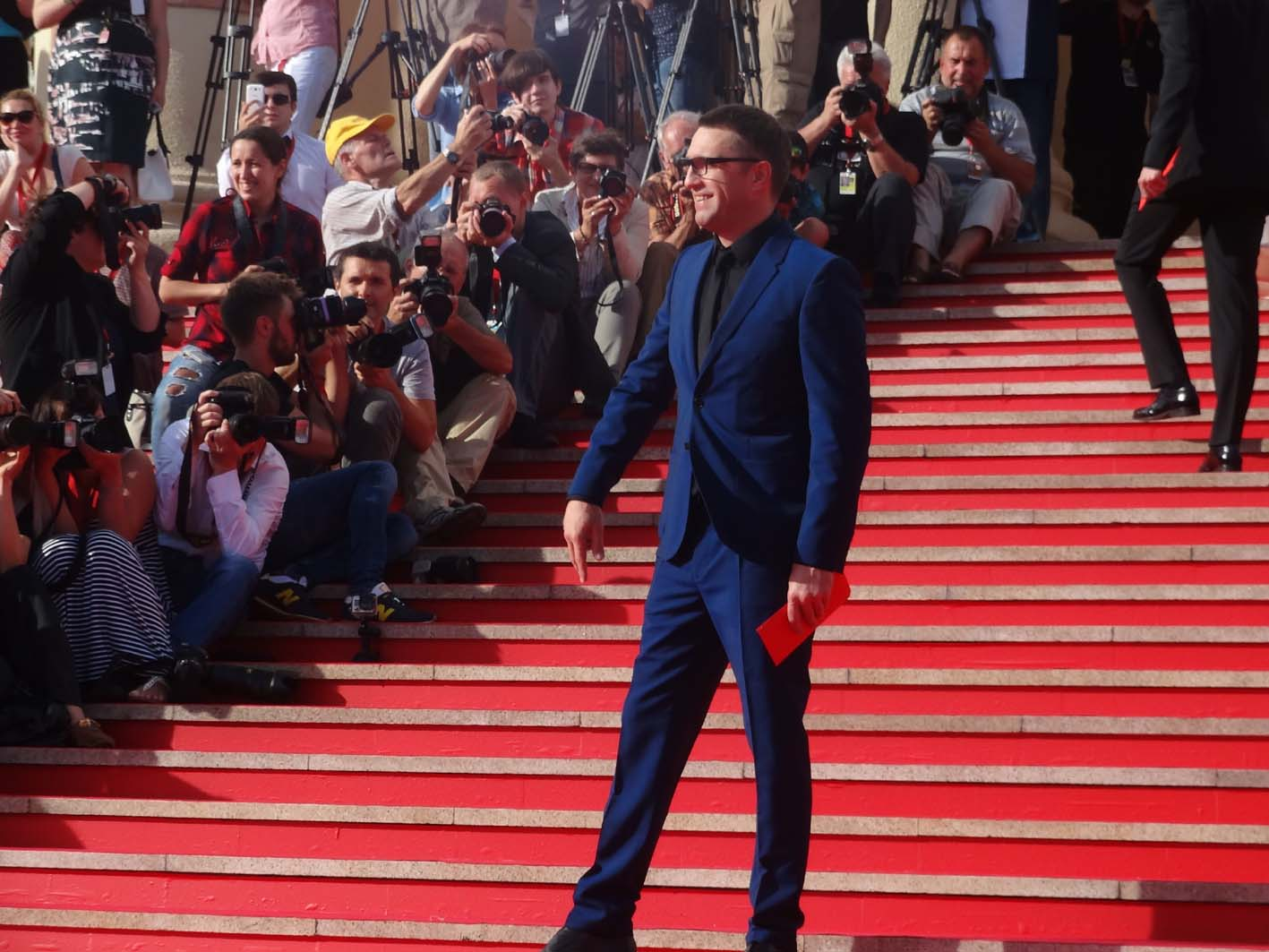
Vladimir Vdovichenkov at the film festival Kinotavr in Sochi 2014.

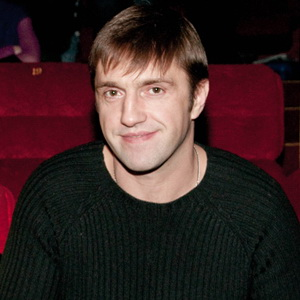
Vladimir Vdovichenkov at the premiere of the film My iz budushchego 2 in 2010

== Filmography ==
Film and television work

Year	Title	Role	Notes
1999	The President and His Granddaughter	Presidential guard	
2000	Artist and Master of Image		
2001	Citizen of the head	Kolya-afganets	TV series
2001	April		
2002	Hot Saturday		
2002	Brigada	Fil	TV series
2003	Bimmer	Kostyan 'Kot'	
2004	Cadets	politruk Vasily Bykov	TV series
2004	Astrologer	Sergey Chumakov – 'Astrologer'	TV series
2004	Heaven and earth	Gennady Nechaev	TV series
2005	A Time to Gather Stones	Captain Demin	
2005	Seventh day	brother Mikhail	
2006	Bimmer – 2	Kostyan 'Kot'	
2006	Besy	Ivan Shatov	TV series
2007	Paragraph 78	Skif	part 1
2007	Paragraph 78	Skif	part 2
2007	Racketeer	Volodya	
2008	Mymra		TV movie
2008	Heavy Sand	Volodya	TV series
2009	Taras Bulba	Ostap Bulba	
2009	Forbidden Reality	Gorshin	
2009	Kromov	Aleksey Kromov	
2009	Exit	Vlad	TV movie
2010	If I loved you	Pavel Neskuchnyy	
2010	A man by the window	Stas	
2012	360	Sergei	
2012	Once in Rostov	Vyacheslav Tolstopyatov	TV series
2012	August Eighth	Prezident	
2012	Feast locked	Misha Sorokin	
2012	The White Guard	Kapitan Pleshko	TV series
2013	Scouts	major Vorotnikov	TV series
2014	Leviathan	Dmitriy	
2015	Rodina	Dmitry Bragin	TV series
2015	Poetic Portraits at Gift Festival		documentary film by shota kalandadze
2017	Salyut 7	Vladimir Fyodorov	
2018	Beyond the Summit (So dna vershiny)		Drama/sport feature film;
2019	Dear Dad (Дорогой папа, Dorogoy papa)	Вадим Дюмин / Vadim Dyumin, main character	
2021	Batya		
2022	Plast	Slava	
2025	Batya 2: Ded	Vladimir	
