= List of Russian films of 2017 =

The following is a list of films produced in Russia in 2017. For a general list of films released in that year, see 2017 in film.

== Film releases ==
Opening		Title	Russian Title	Director	Cast	Genre	Details
J A N U A R Y	1	Three heroes and the King of the Sea	Три богатыря и морской царь	Konstantin Feoktistov	Dmitriy Bykovskiy, Valeriy Solovyov, Sergei Makovetsky	Animation, Action	Melnitsa Animation Studio
J A N U A R Y	19	Paradise	Рай	Andrei Konchalovsky	Yuliya Vysotskaya, Christian Clauss, Philippe Duquesne	Drama	
J A N U A R Y	26	Attraction	Притяжение	Fyodor Bondarchuk	Irina Starshenbaum, Alexander Petrov, Oleg Menshikov, Rinal Mukhametov, Lyudmila Maksakova	Science fiction action	Walt Disney Studios Sony Pictures Releasing (WDSSPR)
F E B R U A R Y	14	Have Fun, Vasya!	Гуляй, Вася!	Roman Karimov	Efim Petrunin, Lyubov Aksyonova, Roman Kurtsyn	Comedy	
F E B R U A R Y	19	Major Grom	Майор Гром	Vladimir Besedin	Aleksandr Gorbatov, Ivan Fominov, Anton Kuznetsov, Danila Yakushev, Mariya Ulyanova	Short, Superhero	
F E B R U A R Y	23	Guardians	Защитники	Sarik Andreasyan	Anton Pampushnyy, Sanzhar Madiyev, Sebastien Sisak, Alina Lanina, Valeriya Shkirando	Superhero	
M A R C H	2	Love Pret-a-porte	Любовь прет-а-порте	Max Nardari	Olga Pogodina, Andrea Preti, Larisa Udovichenko, Giancarlo Giannini	Comedy	Russian – Italian
M A R C H	9	Love with Disabilities	Любовь с ограничениями	Dmitriy Tyurin	Pavel Priluchny, Anna Starshenbaum, Alexey Vorobyov, Aleksey Chadov	Romantic comedy	
M A R C H	16	After You're Gone	После тебя	Anna Matison	Sergey Bezrukov, Anastasia Bezrukova, Elena Babenko, Maria Smolnikova	Comedy drama	

Opening		Title	Russian Title	Director	Cast	Genre	Details
A P R I L	6	The Age of Pioneers	Время первых	Dmitriy Kiselev	Yevgeny Mironov, Konstantin Khabensky	Historical	Based on a real story of Soviet cosmonaut Alexei Leonov, who performed the first spacewalk. Produced by Timur Bekmambetov, distributed by Bazelevs Distribution.
A P R I L	6	Dance to Death	Танцы насмерть	Andrei Volgin	Ivan Zhvakin, Lukeria Ilyaschenko	Science fiction	
A P R I L	20	Kitchen. The Last Battle	Кухня. Последняя битва	Anton Fedotov	Dmitry Nazarov	Comedy	
A P R I L	20	Fantastic Journey to Oz	Урфин Джюс и его деревянные солдаты	Vladimir Toropchin	Ekaterina Gorokhovskaya, Konstantin Khabensky, Sergey Shnurov, Evgeniy Stychkin	Animation	Melnitsa Animation Studio; Official website
M A Y	11	Bolshoi	Большой	Valeriy Todorovskiy	Margarita Simonova, Anna Isayeva, Alisa Freindlich, Aleksandr Domogarov	Drama	
M A Y	18	Bird	Птица	Ksenia Baskakova	Ivan Okhlobystin, Evdokia Malevskaya	Drama	
M A Y	24	Closeness	Теснота	Kantemir Balagov	Darya Zhovner, Olga Dragunova	Drama	
J U N E	1	Loveless	Нелюбовь	Andrey Zvyagintsev	Maryana Spivak, Aleksey Rozin, Matvey Novikov, Marina Vasilyeva	Drama	
J U N E	8	Anna Karenina: Vronsky's Story	Анна Каренина. История Вронского	Karen Shakhnazarov	Elizaveta Boyarskaya, Maksim Matveyev, Vitali Kishchenko, Kirill Grebenshchikov	Drama	
J U N E		Baltic Tango	Холодное танго	Pavel Chukhray	Rinal Mukhametov, Yulia Peresild, Sergei Garmash, Anna Kotova	War drama	

Opening		Title	Russian Title	Director	Cast	Genre	Details
		The Tale of Peter and Fevronia	Сказ о Петре и Февронии	Yuri Kulakov	Vladislav Yudin, Yuliya Gorokhova, Ivan Okhlobystin	Animation	Vverh Animation Studio
		Black Water	Чёрная вода	Roman Karimov	Irina Starshenbaum, Dmitriy Bogdan, Evgeniy Alyokhin	Horror drama	
		Blockbuster	Блокбастер	Roman Volobuev	Svetlana Ustinova, Anna Chipovskaya, Yevgeny Tsyganov	Comedy, Crime	
A U G U S T	17	Naughty Grandma	Бабушка лёгкого поведения	Maryus Vaysberg	Aleksandr Revva, Glukoza, Evgeniy Gerchakov	Comedy	
A U G U S T	31	Gogol. The Beginning	Гоголь. Начало	Egor Baranov	Alexander Petrov, Oleg Menshikov, Taisiya Vilkova, Artyom Tkachenko	Adventure, Detective, Horror	
S E P T E M B E R	14	Partner	Напарник	Aleksander Andryushenko	Sergei Garmash, Andrey Nazimov, Liza Arzamasova	Adventure comedy	Official website
S E P T E M B E R	21	Hostages	Заложники	Rezo Gigineishvili	Irakli Kvirikadze, Tinatin Dalakishvili, Avtandil Makharadze	Drama	
S E P T E M B E R	31	About Love. For Adults Only	Про любовь. Только для взрослых	Rezo Gigineishvili, Anna Melikian	Anna Banshchikova and Maksim Matveyev among others.	Comedy	

Opening		Title	Russian Title	Director	Cast	Genre	Details
O C T O B E R	12	Arrhythmia	Аритмия	Boris Khlebnikov	Aleksandr Yatsenko, Irina Gorbacheva, Nikolay Shrayber	Drama	
O C T O B E R	12	How Vitka Chesnok Drove Lyokha Shtyr to the House for Disabled	Как Витька Чеснок вёз Лёху Штыря в дом инвалидов	Aleksandr Khant	Aleksei Serebryakov	Drama	
O C T O B E R	12	Salyut 7	Салют-7	Klim Shipenko	Vladimir Vdovichenkov, Pavel Derevyanko, Oksana Fandera, Mariya Mironova, Lyubov Aksyonova	Disaster	
O C T O B E R	19	The Last Warrior	Последний богатырь	Dmitry Dyachenko	Viktor Khorinyak, Mila Sivatskaya, Ekaterina Vilkova, Elena Yakovleva, Yevgeny Dyatlov	Fantasy comedy, Action	Walt Disney Studios Sony Pictures Releasing (WDSSPR)
O C T O B E R	25	Mathilda	Матильда	Aleksey Uchitel	Danila Kozlovsky, Grigoriy Dobrygin, Lars Eidinger, Michalina Olszańska, Ingeborga Dapkunaite	Historical	Based on the life of Mathilde Kschessinska, who was a mistress of the future Czar Nicholas II of Russia
N O V E M B E R	2	The Fixies: Top Secret	Фиксики: Большой секрет	Vasiko Bedoshvili	Dmitry Nagiyev, Aleksandr Pushnoy, Diomid Vinogradov	Animation	Petersburg Animation Studio
N O V E M B E R	30	Furious	Легенда о Коловрате	Dzhanik Fayziev, Ivan Shurkhovetsky	Ilya Malakov, Polina Chernyshova, Aleksei Serebryakov, Aleksandr Ilyin Jr., Yulia Khlynina, Mariya Fomina	War epic, Historical fantasy, Action	Central Partnership; Based on the Siege of Ryazan by the Mongol-Tatars in the XIII century and on the Ryazan warrior Evpaty Kolovrat.
D E C E M B E R	21	Yolki 6	Ёлки новые	Zhora Kryzhovnikov, Dmitry Kiselyov	Ivan Urgant, Sergey Svetlakov, Dmitry Nagiev	Comedy	
D E C E M B E R	28	Going Vertical	Движение вверх	Anton Megerdichev	Vladimir Mashkov, Andrey Smolyakov, Ivan Kolesnikov, Kirill Zaytsev, James Tratas, Viktoriya Tolstoganova	Sports drama	Central Partnership
D E C E M B E R	28	Three Heroes and the Princess of Egypt	Три богатыря и принцесса Египта	Konstantin Feoktistov	Sergei Makovetsky, Valeriy Solovyov, Oleg Kulikovich	Animation	Melnitsa Animation Studio, Melnitsa's The Three Bogatyrs; Official website

=== Culturally Russian films ===
- Life (2017 film) is an American science fiction thriller film directed by Daniel Espinosa.

== See also ==
- 2017 in film
- 2017 in Russia
