= Zloy gorod =

Fierce Town
- Directed by: Konstantin Buslov
- Written by: Vadim Golovanov
- Produced by: Konstantin Buslov; Sergei Perepechko
- Starring: Aleksei Guskov; Aleksandr Metyolkin; Vladimir Lyubimtsev; Leonela Manturova; Aleksey Shevchenkov; Maksim Belborodov; Aleksey Rozin; Polina Chernyshova
- Cinematography: Nikita Rozhdestvensky
- Music by: Sergei Shtern
- Production companies: RB Production; Film company "22"; Cinema Fund
- Distributed by: Karo Premier
- Release date: January 30, 2025 (Russia)
- Running time: 110 minutes
- Country: Russia
- Language: Russian
- Budget: ₽1.1 billion
- Box office: ₽394 million

Fierce Town (Russian: Злой город, romanized: Zloy gorod) is a 2025 Russian epic period action film produced and directed by Konstantin Buslov about the Siege of Kozelsk. It tells the story of the defense of the town of Kozelsk in Ancient Rus' during the Mongol Horde. It stars Aleksei Guskov, Aleksandr Metyolkin, Vladimir Lyubimtsev, Leonela Manturova, Aleksey Shevchenkov, Maksim Belborodov, Aleksey Rozin, and Polina Chernyshova.

This film was theatrically released on January 30, 2025

== Plot ==
The film takes place in 1238. The Golden Horde attacked Kozelsk for two months, resulting in the death of thousands of soldiers. Will the city be able to withstand this battle?

== Cast ==
- Aleksei Guskov as monk Daniil, former centurion of the Kozelsk squad Ratsha "both hands"
- Aleksandr Metyolkin as Moguta, Ratsha's former serf
- Vladimir Lyubimtsev as Lyutobor
- Leonela Manturova as Vesnyana
- Aleksey Shevchenkov as monk Vasily, former chieftain of the Berendey bandits
- Maksim Belborodov as the robber Ulyba
- Mitya Makhonin as Prince Vasily of Kozelsk
- Aglaya Shilovskaya as Princess Maria of Kozelsk
- Aleksey Rozin as Vadim of Kozelsk
- Sergey Batalov as a bishop
- Artyom Volobuyev as merchant Kudim
- Dmitry Kulichkov as merchant Tryasila
- Polina Chernyshova as the healer Daria, the goldsmith's daughter
- Vasily Simonov as Radomir, the goldsmith's son
- Yuri Pavlov as Godun
- Viktor Suprun as Zamyata
- Aleksey Voskovich as Vtorusha
- Valery Dyachenko as Simeon
- Ivan Kotikkak Golovnya
- Maksim Solopov as Troyan
- Valery Skorokosov as the blacksmith Tverd

== Production ==
=== Filming ===
Filming began in November 2023, with the Moscow region chosen as the first location, and then the crew moved to the Tver region. For this purpose, a full-scale wooden city with a 12-meter-high wall, a five-meter-wide moat, and a bridge across the river were built. After filming is completed, the set will be used by other crews. The costume department crafted over a thousand historical costumes. For the crowd scenes, people with a characteristic Mongoloid appearance from Yakutia, Kalmykia, Russia, and Kazakhstan were recruited. Filming was completed by the end of May 2024.

== Release ==
Fierce Town was theatrically released in Russia on January 30, 2025, by Karo Premier Film Distribution.

== See also ==
- Furious is a 2017 Russian epic period action film directed by Dzhanik Fayziev about the Siege of Ryazan.
