= Merzlikin =

Merzlikin (Russian: Мерзликин) is a Russian masculine surname, its feminine counterpart is Merzlikina. Notable people with the surname include:

- Andrey Merzlikin (born 1973), Russian actor
- Elvis Merzļikins (born 1994), Latvian ice hockey goaltender
