= Nebesnaya komanda =

- Directed by: Vladimir Alenikov
- Written by: Vladimir Alenikov
- Produced by: Oleg Zharov; Yuri Vaksman; Vladimir Alenikov
- Starring: Anton Rogachev; Kristina Korbut; Nikita Volkov; Aleksei Guskov; Irina Rozanova; Sergey Batalov; Andrey Merzlikin; Yanina Tretyakova
- Cinematography: Aleksey Fyodorov
- Music by: Yaroslav Timofeyev
- Production company: YarSinema
- Distributed by: Karoprokat
- Release date: September 9, 2021
- Running time: 87 min.
- Countries: Russia; Belarus
- Language: Russian

Nebesnaya komanda (Russian: Небесная команда) is a 2021 Russian-Belarusian drama film directed by Vladimir Alenikov. It was theatrically released on September 9, 2021.

== Plot ==
The film tells about the fans of the Lokomotiv Yaroslavl ice hockey club, who go to Minsk to support their favorite team. This trip will change their lives and the sports world forever.

== Cast ==
- Anton Rogachev as Artyom
- Kristina Korbut as Vika
- Nikita Volkov as Volodya
- Aleksei Guskov as director of the sports school
- Irina Rozanova as Manya
- Sergey Batalov as Georginych
- Andrey Merzlikin as Zhenya
- Yanina Tretyakova as Yulya
- Marianna Vasilyeva as Elya
- Kseniya Utekhina as Marina
- Vyacheslav Fetisov as cameo

== Facts. ==
- Movie was dedicated in memory of the tragedy happened to Lokomotiv Yaroslav club in 2011, 10 years ago prior to the release of a movie.

== See also ==
- List of films about ice hockey
