= Father (2007 film) =

- Russian: Отец
- Directed by: Ivan Solovov
- Written by: Natalya Chepik; Irakli Kvirikadze
- Produced by: Aleksandr Krylov
- Starring: Aleksei Guskov; Polina Kutepova; Svetlana Ivanova; Vasiliy Prokopev; Roman Madyanov
- Music by: Aleksey Rybnikov
- Release date: 2007
- Country: Russia
- Language: Russian

Father (Russian: Отец) is a 2007 Russian historical romance film directed by Ivan Solovov.

== Plot ==
The film takes place after the war, but Alexei Ivanov is still scared. He is afraid that his children and wife have forgotten him. Also disturbing is the girl Masha, who returns to her hometown. They meet on a train that takes them home. Alexey led her home, made a promise that he would remember her and went to his relatives.

== Cast ==
- Aleksei Guskov as Aleksei Ivanov
- Polina Kutepova as Lyuba
- Svetlana Ivanova as Masha
- Vasiliy Prokopev as Petrusha
- Roman Madyanov as Khariton
- Nina Ruslanova as Anyuta
- Aleksandr Bashirov as Nikolai
- Yekaterina Vasilyeva as Aunt Klava
- Lyudmila Arinina as Aunt Musya
- Lidiya Velezheva as Kira
