= Solntse na vkus =

2023 Russian-Uzbek children's film

- Directed by: Eldar Salavatov
- Written by: Yuliya Lukshina; Sergey Lakhtin
- Produced by: Firdavs Abdukhalikov; Eduard Gorbenko; Alexander Kessel; Ada Solvich
- Starring: Leonid Basov; Kamila Yakubova; Aleksandr Ilyin; Andrey Merzlikin; Yelena Polyakova; Abror Bakirov; Ronaldo Laspinas
- Cinematography: Bakhodir Yuldashev
- Edited by: Roman Lesnevsky
- Production company: Sputnik Vostok Production
- Distributed by: KaroRental
- Release date: June 8, 2023 (Russia)
- Running time: 88 minutes
- Countries: Russia, Uzbekistan
- Language: Russian

Solntse na vkus (Russian: Солнце на вкус, romanized: Solntse na vkus, lit. 'The Sun Tastes'; Uzbek: Quyosh Ta`mi, lit. 'The Taste of the Sun') is a 2023 Russian-Uzbek children's fantasy comedy film directed by Eldar Salavatov. It stars Leonid Basov, Kamila Yakubova and Aleksandr Ilyin.

This film was theatrically released on June 8, 2023.

== Plot ==
The film tells about a boy who went on vacation to his grandfather in Uzbekistan and found a mysterious medallion in his barn, which turned out to be the key to the treasures of the Emir of Bukhara. Timur has many adventures ahead...

== Cast ==
- Leonid Basov as Timur
- Kamila Yakubova as Gulya
- Aleksandr Ilyin as grandfather
- Andrey Merzlikin as father
- Yelena Polyakova as mother
- Abror Bakirov
- Ronaldo Laspinas
