= Deni i Meni v kino! =

Deni and Meni. At the Cinema!
- Directed by: Anton Kalinkin; Ruslan Knyazev; Dzhanik Fayziev
- Written by: Anton Kalinkin; Ruslan Knyazev; Dzhanik Fayziev; Yelizaveta Sheremetyeva; Polina Kulikova
- Produced by: Anton Kalinkin; Ruslan Knyazev; Dzhanik Fayziev; Yekaterina Kovalenko
- Starring: Deni; Meni; Stepan Devonin; Olga Venikova
- Cinematography: Igor Levchenko
- Edited by: Denis Zhuchkov
- Music by: Ryan Otter
- Production company: RED Carpet Studio
- Distributed by: National Media Group Film Distribution
- Release date: June 4, 2026 (Russia)
- Running time: 70 minutes
- Country: Russia
- Language: Russian
- Box office: ₽113 million

Deni and Meni. At the Cinema!, also known as Deni and Mani (Russian: Дени и Мэни в кино!, romanized: Deni i Meni v kino!) is a 2026 Russian children's comedy film directed, written, and produced by Anton Kalinkin, Ruslan Knyazev, and Dzhanik Fayziev. The film stars Russian bloggers Deni the Labrador Retriever and Meni the Sphynx cat, who rose to fame on social media thanks to their friendship. Igor Levchenko was a cinematographer. The soundtrack for the film was written by Rayan Otter.

This film was theatrically released on June 4, 2026, by National Media Group Film Distribution.

== Plot ==
Inseparable friends Deni, a Labrador, and Meni, a Sphynx cat, are popular social media stars with millions of followers worldwide. Their routine changes dramatically when Deni receives a lucrative and large advertising contract. The agreement requires the dog to temporarily move into the home of his manager and agent, Andrey, forcing the friends to experience their first extended separation.

Deni is immersed in the dazzling and tempting world of show business, where constant filming, camera flashes, and intense media attention await him. However, behind the glitz of his popularity lies a longing for home. Gradually, the Labrador begins to realize that no amount of commercial success or international fame can replace a real family and genuine friendship.

At the same time, the storyline of Agent Andrey unfolds. The young man is experiencing a serious crisis in his personal relationship with his fiancée, Natasha, and their engagement is in jeopardy. Thanks to his canine devotion and spontaneity, Deni helps Andrey rethink what is happening, save his love, and once again believe in true feelings.

== Cast ==
- Deni the Labrador as himself (English: Dani)
- Meni the Sphynx cat as himself (English: Manny)
- Stepan Devonin as Andrey, Deni's agent and manager (English: Andrei)
- Olga Venikova as Natalya "Natasha", Andrey's fiancée (English: Natalia)
- Alyona Isidorova
- Artyom Vasilishin
- Artyom Tkachenko
- Viktoriya Razumeyko as an episode
- Vlad Lisovets as a cameo appearance
- Denis Bondarenko
- Dmitry Khrustalev
- Yevgeny Vasilenko
- Evgenia Medvedeva as a cameo appearance
- Zhanyl Asanbekova
- Igor Jijikine
- Ksenia Milaya (credited as Ksenia Selicheva)
- Lira Kekeeva
- Nika Varlamova
- Nikita Dyuvbanov
- Oleg Shustov
- Ruslan Knyazev as an episode
- Sarah Tarekegn as an episode
- Stepan Konstantinov

== Production ==
The producers came up with the idea for a full-length film after the success of the Labrador duo Deni and Meni (Deni and Mani) on Russian-language social media. Short videos featuring the animals regularly garnered millions of views, and the combined reach of their posts exceeded 150 million views.

The director's chair was shared by Anton Kalinkin, Ruslan Knyazev, and Dzhanik Fayziev, the owner and caretaker of the animals Deni and Meni, also known as Deni & Mani.

=== Post-production ===
One of the distinctive features of the filming process was the complete avoidance of computer graphics (CGI) and artificial intelligence technologies for animating the animals—all scenes featuring Deni and Meni were filmed live.
