= Lev Yashin. The Goalee of My Dreams =

- Theatrical release poster
- Directed by: Vasiliy Chiginskiy (ru)
- Written by: Oleg Kapanets; Aleksandr Polozov; Vladimir Valutskiy
- Produced by: Oleg Kapanets
- Starring: Aleksandr Fokin; Yulia Khlynina; Aleksei Guskov; Aleksei Kravchenko; Yevgeny Dyatlov; Vitaliy Khaev; Mikhail Eliseev
- Cinematography: Vyacheslav Lazarev; Anton Antonov
- Edited by: Tatyana Matyukhina
- Music by: George Kallis
- Production company: Kremlin Films
- Distributed by: Megogo Distribution
- Release date: November 28, 2019 (Russia)
- Running time: 120 minutes
- Country: Russia
- Language: Russian
- Budget: ₽360 million $8 million
- Box office: ₽114 million $1,778,723

Lev Yashin. The Goalee of My Dreams (Лев Яшин. Вратарь моей мечты, transl. Lev Yashin. The Dream Goalkeeper) is a 2019 Russian biographical sports drama film, unfolded in the historical period of the 50s and 60s of the USSR, telling the audience about the legend of the Soviet Union national football team.

The film was directed by Vasiliy Chiginskiy, the script written by Aleksandr Polozov and produced by Oleg Kapanets about the life of the famous Soviet football goalkeeper Lev Yashin, where most of the characters are real people. The film stars Aleksandr Fokin as Yashin, with Yulia Khlynina, Aleksei Guskov, and Aleksei Kravchenko.

The film was theatrically released in Russia on November 28, 2019, by Megogo Distribution.

== Plot ==
The film tells about the legendary goalkeeper Lev Yashin, thanks to whose efforts the USSR team in the mid-20th century won the most significant football awards.

May 27, 1971. Moscow, waiting for the farewell match of football goalkeeper Lev Yashin. For the first time in the history of the Soviet football player, all the stars of world football will be honored.

In anticipation of this event, Lev Yashin recalls the people and the matches with which his career was associated – and the ridiculous goal conceded in the first match for the main Dynamo squad, after which he sat on the bench for 2 years; and hard training, returning him to the main team; and speaking for the Soviet Union national football team at the 1960 European Nations' Cup; and failure at the 1962 FIFA World Cup in Chile, which could put an end to his career; and the match for the world team on October 23, 1963, in London.

== Cast ==
Cast	Soviet Footballer of the Year
Aleksandr Fokin	Lev Yashin, Soviet football goalkeeper
Yulia Khlynina	Valentina Yashina, Lev Yashin's wife
Aleksei Guskov	Mikhail Yakushin, head coach of the FC Dynamo Moscow in 1953–1960
Aleksei Kravchenko	Alexei Khomich, a goalkeeper of the FC Dynamo Moscow
Yevgeny Dyatlov	Arkadiy Chernyshov, hockey coach of the HC Dynamo Moscow
Vitaliy Khaev	Aleksandr Ponomaryov, head coach of the Soviet Union Olympic football team
Mikhail Eliseev	Gavriil Kachalin, head coach of the Soviet Union national football team in 1968–1970
Yan Tsapnik	TASS own correspondent
Aleksandr Samoylenko	Mishurin, an official of the USSR Sports Committee
Aleksandr Bukharov	Konstantin Beskov, head coach of the FC Dynamo Moscow in 1967–1973
Yuri Galtsev	school principal
Boris Shcherbakov	Mironych, bus driver
Alexander Pyatkov	Mikhalych, janitor
Yaroslav Zhalnin	Vladimir Shabrov, Lev Yashin's friend
Yevgeny Antropov	Mikhail Galunov, childhood friend of Lev Yashin
Andrey Leonov	Nikolay Ozerov, Soviet sports commentator
Actors	USSR soccer player
Oleg Kapanets	Ivan Stankevich, second coach of the FC Dynamo Moscow
Mikhail Khimichev	Vsevolod Blinkov, coach of the FC Dynamo Moscow
Ivan Titov	Valentin Ivanov, football player
Anzhey Novosyolov	Valeriy Voronin, football player
Yaroslav Leonov	Eduard Streltsov, football player
Artyom Yeshkin	Viktor Ponedelnik, football player
Dmitriy Belotserkovskiy	Igor Netto, captain of the USSR national football team
Pavel Shevando	Anatoliy Ilin, football player
Vladimir Guskov	Igor Chislenko, football player
Yuriy Trubin	Alekper Mamedov, football player
Aleksandr Luchinin	Viktor Tsaryov, football player
Igor Silchenko	Boris Kuznetsov, football player
Andrey Klavdiev	Genrikh Fedosov, football player
Yevgeny Romantsov	Konstantin Krizhevskiy, football player
Aleksandr Ragulin	Vasiliy Trofimov, football player
Aleksandr Alyoshkin	Vladimir Savdunin, football player
Stanislav Raskachaev	Sergey Salnikov, football player
Vakhtang Makhareishvili	Mikhail Meskhi, football player
Dmitriy Arbenin	Valentin Bubukin, football player
Ruslan Nakhushev	Anatoliy Bubukin
Aram Vardevanyan	Nikita Simonyan, football player
Danila Tezov	Vladimir Kesarev, football player
Gleb Gervassiyev	Vladimir Belyaev, football player
Irakliy Kvantrishvili	Valter Sanaya, football player

== Production ==
=== Filming ===
The production began in 2014, in collaboration between members of the Russian Ministry of Culture and the Dynamo Sports Club Association. The filming was done in Moscow and its suburbs in collaboration with the VTB Bank and FC Dynamo Moscow. About the film's oversight work was Amon Sergei Stepashin, the former Russian interior minister, who wanted to make sure to produce a biographical film about the life of the renowned doorman.

The film received approval and support from veterans of domestic sports, partners of Lev Yashin in games for the club and the USSR national team, from the goalkeeper's family and numerous Dynamo fans.

== Release ==
Premiere of the film Lev Yashin. The Goalee of My Dreams was held in Moscow at the October cinema center on November 25, 2019, and was theatrically released in the Russian Federation on November 28, 2019, by Megogo Distribution. The television premiere of the film took place on June 12, 2020, Russia Day with a celebration on Channel One.

== See also ==
- Legend No. 17, a Russian biographical sports drama film
- Going Vertical (2017 film), a Russian sports drama film
