= Baba Yaga (2023 film) =

2023 Russian animated film by Vladimir Sakov

- Theatrical release poster
- Directed by: Vladimir Sakov
- Written by: Leonid Barats; Aleksandr Chistyakov; Gregory Poirier; Vadim Sveshnikov
- Produced by: Fedor Bondarchuk; Aleksandr Chistyakov
- Starring: Yulia Khlynina; Lidiya Chistyakova-Ionova; Fedor Bondarchuk; Elena Shulman; Ilya Blednyy; Diomid Vinogradov; Vera Chistyakova-Ionova; Zlata Osipova
- Edited by: Evgeniy Ryazanov
- Music by: Igor Vdovin
- Production companies: Gluk'oza Animation; Art Pictures Studio
- Distributed by: NMG Kinoprokat
- Release dates: 22 April 2023 (Moscow Film Festival); 27 April 2023 (Russia)
- Running time: 101 minutes
- Country: Russia
- Language: Russian
- Budget: ₽450 million
- Box office: $2.6 million

Baba Yaga (Russian: Яга и книга заклинаний, romanized: Yaga i kniga zaklinaniy, lit. 'Yaga and the Book of Spells') is a 2023 Russian animated fantasy adventure film directed by Valdimir Sakov. The film follows Baba Yaga who is trying to get better at magic, until an unexpected visit from Princess Sapphire offers Yaga a chance to get even with her enemy.

== Cast ==
- Yulia Khlynina as Baba Yaga
- Lidiya Chistyakova-Ionova as Sineglazka
- Fyodor Bondarchuk as Leshiy
- Elena Shulman as Belladonna
- Ilya Blednyy as Lis
- Diomid Vinogradov as Kotofey/Kozyol Burka/Vodyanoy/Shishki
- Vera Chistyakova-Ionova as Yadviga
- Zlata Osipova as Zlata

== Release ==
Central Partnership International acquired the worldwide sales in June 2020. Baba Yaga premiered at the Moscow Film Festival on 22 April 2023, and was released theatrically in Russia on 27 April 2023.

== Reception ==
Nikolay Kornatsky of Vedomosti noted that "Everything is schematic, predictable, but lively, occasionally funny and almost always very beautiful, especially the underwater world".
