= Aleksey Shevchenkov =

Russian actor

- Алексей Шевченков
- Born: Aleksey Vladimirovich Shevchenko; 2 November 1974; Chernyakhovsk, Kaliningrad Oblast, RSFSR, USSR
- Occupation: Actor
- Years active: 1994–present

Aleksey Vladimirovich Shevchenkov (Russian: Алексе́й Влади́мирович Шевче́нков; born November 2, 1974) is a Russian actor. Merited Artist of the Russian Federation (2006). He appeared in 130 films.

== Biography ==
Aleksey was born on November 2, 1974. He studied acting at the Russian State Institute of Performing Arts. In 1997, he began working at the Moscow Drama Theater under the direction of Armen Dzhigarkhanyan, and since 2010 he has been an actor at the Moscow Chekhov Art Theatre. In 1994 he made his film debut.

Shevchenko supported Russia's invasion of Ukraine.

== Selected filmography ==
| Year | Title | Role | Notes |
|---|---|---|---|
| 1993 | You Are My Only Love | student | |
| 1999 | Voroshilov Sharpshooter | Khekon | |
| 1999 | Mother | Max | |
| 2004 | Moth Games | Kupriyanov | |
| 2011 | Once Upon a Time There Lived a Simple Woman | Malafey | |
| 2012 | The Horde | Vasili | |
| 2013 | Judas | Judas Iscariot | |
| 2018 | Decision: Liquidation | Aleksandr Petrov | |
| 2019 | Saving Leningrad | Ivan Yerofeyev | |
| 2021 | Tourist | Alexey | |
| 2021 | The Red Ghost | The Red Ghost | |
| 2023 | Actresses | Vyacheslav Yuryevich | TV series |
| 2024 | Commander | Pavel, a soldier at the station | |
| 2025 | Zloy gorod | monk Vasily | |
