= Tourist (film) =

- Directed by: Andrey Batov (Shcherbinin)
- Written by: Vladimir Izmaylov
- Produced by: Sergei Shcheglov; Genkirkh Ken
- Starring: Aleksey Shevchenkov; Alexandr Baranovsky; Vladimir Petrov; Yevgeny Terskikh; Flavia-Gertrude Mbayabe; Sergey Vorobyov
- Cinematography: Garik Zhamgaryan; Dmitry Arefev
- Music by: Vitaly Mukanyayev
- Production companies: 3xMedia; Aurum Production; Paritet
- Release date: May 19, 2021 (Russia)
- Running time: 99 minutes
- Countries: Russia; Central African Republic
- Languages: Russian, Arabic, English, French

Tourist (Russian: Турист, romanized: Turist) is a 2021 Russian-Central African Republic action film directed by Andrey Batov and produced by Sergei Shcheglov. According to Matthew Campbell, writing in The Times, it is a "most eye-catching piece of propaganda", which depicts the Wagner Group, a mercenary force supported by Yevgeny Prigozhin, who sponsored the film. It was released in Russia on May 19, 2021. Dubbed in Sango, the film was presented to a sold-out stadium in Bangui, the capital of the Central African Republic in 2021.

The story revolves around a group of Russian instructors visiting the Central African Republic with former police officer Grisha Dmitriev who end up fighting with bandits. The film debuted at the Barthélemy Boganda stadium in Bangui. The film was shot in March and April in 2021.

== Plot ==
In December 2020, former police officer Grisha Dmitriev joins a group of Russian military instructors sent to the Central African Republic (CAR) to train local soldiers in combat tactics. Grisha, initially nicknamed "Pioneer" due to his youth and inexperience, earns the new callsign "Tourist" and quickly clashes with a seasoned instructor, "Makhet," who harbors a deep disdain for police officers. As the instructors conduct their training, several militant factions mobilize to seize the capital, Bangui, in an effort to disrupt the presidential elections and stage a coup. Despite being prohibited from engaging in the conflict unless directly threatened, the Russian instructors find themselves drawn into several battles, providing crucial support to the CAR Armed Forces (FACA) and defending key positions against advancing insurgents.

The situation escalates when coup organizers target a remote, lightly defended FACA base near the town of Bangassou, where only ten Russian instructors are stationed. Reinforcements include local militia and a contingent of professional mercenaries flown in from Chad. As the militants prepare their assault, the instructors, facing overwhelming odds, brace for a desperate defense. Grisha, assigned as Makhet's machine gun assistant, volunteers to help a group of African soldiers trapped in a building and meets Catherine, a local fighter. The two are ambushed, and Grisha is severely wounded while rescuing Catherine. Despite his injuries, he manages to turn the tide of the skirmish, only to be saved by Makhet and another instructor during a narrow escape. Makhet, moved by Grisha's valor, reveals his hatred for police stems from personal tragedy, forging a tentative bond between them.

The instructors successfully repel the attack, preventing the militants from taking the base. Grisha and Catherine are airlifted to safety, while the coup fails, allowing CAR’s incumbent president to secure reelection. Back in Russia, Grisha reevaluates his purpose after a disillusioning conversation with a corrupt former colleague. Realizing where he can truly pursue justice, he returns to Africa, now a seasoned and respected fighter committed to supporting stability in the region.

== Cast ==
- Aleksey Shevchenkov as Aleksey, call sign "Makhet" (Russian: "Макет", romanized: "Maket")
- Alexandr Baranovsky as call sign "Limon"
- Vladimir Petrov as Grisha Dmitriev, call sign "Tourist"
- Yevgeny Terskikh as Zhenya, call sign "Kuban"
- Flavia-Gertrude Mbayabe as Katrin, CAR army sergeant
- Sergey Vorobyov as Sergey, call sign "Yenisey"
- Georgy Bolonev as call sign "Korg"
- Gleb Temnov as call sign "Seventh"
- Sergey Garusov as call sign "Pamir"
- Bian Venu as President Faustin-Archange Touadéra
- Mac Armel as François Bozizé
