= Maria. Save Moscow =

- Directed by: Vera Storozheva
- Written by: Elena Rayskaya
- Produced by: Natalya Ivanova; Konstantin Elkin; Maxim Rogalsky; Maria Ksinopulo
- Starring: Mariya Lugovaya; Artur Smolyaninov; Ilya Malakov; Sergei Puskepalis
- Cinematography: Mikhail Iskandarov
- Edited by: Elena Afanasieva
- Music by: Yuri Poteyenko
- Production company: Horosho Production
- Distributed by: Nashe Kino (English: Our Cinema)
- Release dates: December 12, 2021 (Stalker Film Festival); January 27, 2022 (Moscow)
- Running time: 111 minutes
- Country: Russia
- Language: Russian

Maria. Save Moscow (Russian: Мария. Спасти Москву, romanized: Mariya. Spasti Moskvu) is a 2021 Russian war / drama film directed by Vera Storozheva. It premiered at the Stalker Film Festival on December 12, 2021, and was theatrically released on January 27, 2022.

== Plot ==
The plot takes place during the Great Patriotic War and focuses on the battle for Moscow.

The year is 1941. Moscow is threatened by the German army, and a clairvoyant, the blessed elder Matrona, appears in the capital. News of her spreads quickly throughout the city, drawing crowds of visitors eager to learn the fate of their loved ones. Under orders from her superiors, Junior Lieutenant of the NKVD, Maria Petrova, an ardent atheist, is sent to meet Matrona. Later, even Stalin himself visits the elder, who predicts victory in the war and advises him on how to save Moscow from the enemy: to permit prayer services in churches and to encircle the city with a specific miraculous icon — the Tikhvin Icon of the Mother of God.

However, the icon is located in occupied territory, and Maria Petrova is tasked with bringing it to Moscow. A diversionary group, including Maria, infiltrates behind enemy lines, kills a civilian, steals the icon from a church, and takes the local priest, Father Vladimir, hostage. The mission spirals out of control as the group is exposed, forcing Maria and her comrades to fend off German troops. One by one, her comrades fall, leaving Father Vladimir as her only companion — he refuses to abandon the icon. Furthermore, Father Vladimir recognizes Maria as the daughter of Father Alexander, his predecessor who was executed, and feels it is his duty to accompany her to Moscow. It is later revealed that he himself is an NKVD agent.

Near Moscow, Maria and Vladimir are captured by Red Army soldiers. Their commander, believing a Nazi leaflet accusing them of murder, orders their execution. A sudden German attack interrupts the execution. Father Vladimir is killed, but Maria completes her mission and delivers the Tikhvin Icon to the capital. The icon is loaded onto a plane and flown around Moscow.

== Cast ==
- Mariya Lugovaya as Maria Petrova (also tr. Mariya Petrova)
- Artur Smolyaninov as Father Vladimir (Vladimir Sergeevich Stroganov), parish priest
- Ilya Malakov as Sergeant
- Sergei Puskepalis as Commissioner
- Dmitry Mazurov as Pavel Minaev
- Tatyana Yakhina as Lyuba Minaeva

== Production ==
Filming ended in February 2021, with shooting taking place in Moscow and Rostov Veliky.

== Release ==
Maria. Save Moscow premiered at the Stalker Human Rights Film Festival on December 12, 2021 and was theatrically released in Russia on January 27, 2022.
