= Night Mode (film) =

2022 Russian thriller film

- Russian: Nochnoy rezhim
- Directed by: Andrey Libenson
- Written by: Sergey Novikov; Aleksandr Buzin
- Produced by: Igor Mishin; Maksim Filatov; Natalya Isakova; Viktor Mitrofanov; Aleksey Teplygin
- Starring: Pavel Tabakov; Andrey Merzlikin; Ekaterina Shumakova; Andrey Karako; Andrey Dushechkin
- Cinematography: Andrey Iosifov
- Music by: Igor Sychev
- Production companies: MTS Media; TO Kedr
- Distributed by: KaroProkat (English: KaroRental)
- Release date: August 18, 2022 (Russia)
- Running time: 122 minutes
- Country: Russia
- Language: Russian

Night Mode (Russian: Ночной режим. Фильм, romanized: Nochnoy rezhim) is a Russian sci-fi thriller film directed by Andrey Libenson. It stars Pavel Tabakov and Andrey Merzlikin. This film was theatrically released on August 18, 2022.

== Plot ==
The film tells about the photographer Roman, who is accused of killing four people. He is sure that he is innocent, but he is not able to remember what happened. Once in prison, he meets a mysterious man in his dreams who calls himself Master and offers his help.

== Cast ==
- Pavel Tabakov as Roman Belov
- Andrey Merzlikin as teacher
- Ekaterina Shumakova as Irina
- Andrey Karako as Kirill
- Andrey Dushechkin as Dmitry
- Igor Sigov as Sasha
- Andrey Oliferenko as warden
- Aleksei Trufanov as Filin
- Anton Makukha as Kadyk
- Viktor Bogushevich as Belomor
