= Desperate Shareholders =

- Directed by: Ilya Farfell
- Written by: Vyacheslav Zub; Anatoly Molchanov
- Produced by: Eduard Iloyan (ru); Vitaly Shlyappo (ru); Denis Zhalinsky; Aleksey Trotsyuk
- Starring: Maksim Lagashkin; Mikhail Trukhin; Ekaterina Stulova; Nikita Kologrivyy; Olga Venikova
- Cinematography: Maksim Mikhanyuk
- Edited by: Dmitry Smorchkov
- Production company: Yellow, Black and White
- Distributed by: Central Partnership
- Release date: April 28, 2022 (Russia)
- Running time: 90 minutes
- Country: Russia
- Language: Russian

Desperate Shareholders (Russian: Отчаянные дольщики, romanized: Otchayannye dolshchiki) is a 2022 Russian crime comedy film directed by Ilya Farfell. The film produced by Yellow, Black and White also starred Maksim Lagashkin, Mikhail Trukhin, Ekaterina Stulova, Nikita Kologrivyy, and Olga Venikova. The film tells about a dishonest developer who gave two married couples foundation pits instead of houses, as a result of which they decided to take hostage the director of the company that built their houses.

Desperate Shareholders was theatrically released on April 28, 2022, by Central Partnership.

== Plot ==
In the center of events are two ordinary couples who are tired of renting a house and finally decided to take out a mortgage. However, instead of the promised dream apartment, the families received a wasteland with a foundation pit. Deciding to take matters into their own hands, the main characters go to the developer in the hope of getting a sane answer from him to the question of where their new home is. By an absurd coincidence, the head of a construction company is held hostage by them.

== Cast ==
- Maksim Lagashkin as Oleg Statsky, construction scam
- Mikhail Trukhinn as Grigory, a shareholder
- Ekaterina Stulova as Inga, Grigory's wife
- Nikita Kologrivyy as Denis "Den", a shareholder
- Olga Venikova as Alyona, Denis' fiancee
- Aleksandra Florinskaya as Svetlana Statskaya, Oleg's wife
- Grigory Siyatvinda as Leonid "Lyonya", district police officer
- Kirill Grebenshchikov as Nikolay, the investigator
- Ekaterina Shmakova as a journalist
- Zhannat Kerimbayev as a builder

== Production ==
The director was Ilya Farfell, who lived in the USA and Israel for a long time before moving to Russia. Prior to the development of the comedy, the director did not know about the problem of unfair performance of duties by construction companies. Farfell began to study this issue in detail and was surprised that this popular topic, which affected many Russian citizens, had not been shown in the cinema before. The filming process began in June 2021 in Moscow.
