= Yulia Khlynina =

Russian actress (born 1992)

- Юлия Хлынина
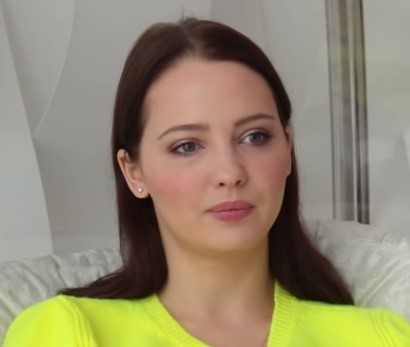
- Khlynina in 2019
- Born: Yulia Olegovna Khlynina; January 11, 1992 (age 34); Moscow, Russia
- Occupation: Actress
- Years active: 2010–present
- Height: 169 cm (5 ft 7 in)

Yulia Olegovna Khlynina (Russian: Юлия Олеговна Хлынина; born 11 January 1992) is a Russian actress.

== Early life ==
Yulia Khlynina was born in Moscow, Russia. In early childhood she studied dance and went to a ballet studio. Khlynina worked for three years in the children's drama theater "Miracle" at the Balakirev Music School in Vykhino. She studied well and graduated from a specialized economic-geographical class.

After receiving the diploma of secondary education, she went for entrance exams simultaneously to the biology faculty of Moscow State University, to the Institute for Nuclear Research, to the Moscow Mining University and to three theaters of higher education, the Moscow Art Theatre, the Russian Institute of Theatre Arts and Boris Shchukin Theatre Institute. She was accepted at all of the educational institutes. Out of these creative and non-creative educational institutions, she chose the Moscow Art Theatre.

In 2013 she graduated from the Moscow Art Theatre School, workshop of Konstantin Raikin. Her works in the educational theater of the Moscow Art Theater School: The Final Cut., Choreographic requiem based on the music of the group Pink Floyd directed by Alla Sigalova; We are Karamazo You (sketches and dialogues based on the novel The Brothers Karamazov by Fyodor Dostoevsky) directed by Viktor Ryzhakov; "We have in Kamergersky", a performance-divertissement: sketches for acting and plasticity, directors Konstantin Raikin, Elena Butenko-Raikina and Sergei Shentalinsky.

During her studies she made her debut on the stage of the theater "Satyricon", in the role of Julieta.

== Career ==
Since 2010, she has been acting in films, having made her debut in the melodrama TV series The Last Minute. Afterwards, she acted in the film Astra, I Love You (2012).

In 2013 she performed her first major roles. In the crime comedy All at Once she played Motya, and Marina Ryabinskaya in the TV series Deceive, if You Love. In the same year she starred as Sonya in Stanislav Govorukhin's Weekend.

The actress received wider recognition among the general public after her role of the affected intellectual Liza who dreams of becoming a writer in the series The Law of the Concrete Jungle on the TNT channel.

In 2016, the film The Duelist by Aleksey Mizgirev was released, Yulia performed the role of Princess Martha Tuchkova - the sister of Prince Tuchkov, portrayed by Pavel Tabakov.

Yulia played the role of Lada in the historical fantasy film Furious by Ivan Shurkhovetskiy in 2017.

== Selected filmography ==
Year	Title	Role	Notes
2010	The Last Minute	Kristina	TV series
2012	Astra, I Love You		novel "Surprise me"
2013	Deceive, if You Love	Marina Ryabinskaya	TV series
2013	Without a trace	Nastya	Short film
2013	Weekend	Sonya	(ru)
2013	Dopamine		Short film
2014	All at Once	Motya	
2015	Happiness is...	girl	
2015	The Law of the Concrete Jungle	Liza	TV series
2016	The Duelist	Martha Tuchkova	
2016	Watermelon Pinds	Kristina	
2017	Furious	Lada	
2018	Selfie		
2018	Buy Me	Katya	
2018	Call DiCaprio	Dasha	
2019	Lev Yashin. The Goalee of My Dreams	Valentina Yashina	
2020	Ice 2	Margarita 'Rita'	
2022	Aeterna	Katarina (Katari) Ollar	
2022	Elizaveta	Elizabeth of Russia	
2023	Baba Yaga	Baba Yaga	
2025	Overheard in Rybinsk	Zoya Grigoryeva	TV series
