= Aleksei Guskov =

Soviet and Russian actor and producer

- Алексей Гуськов
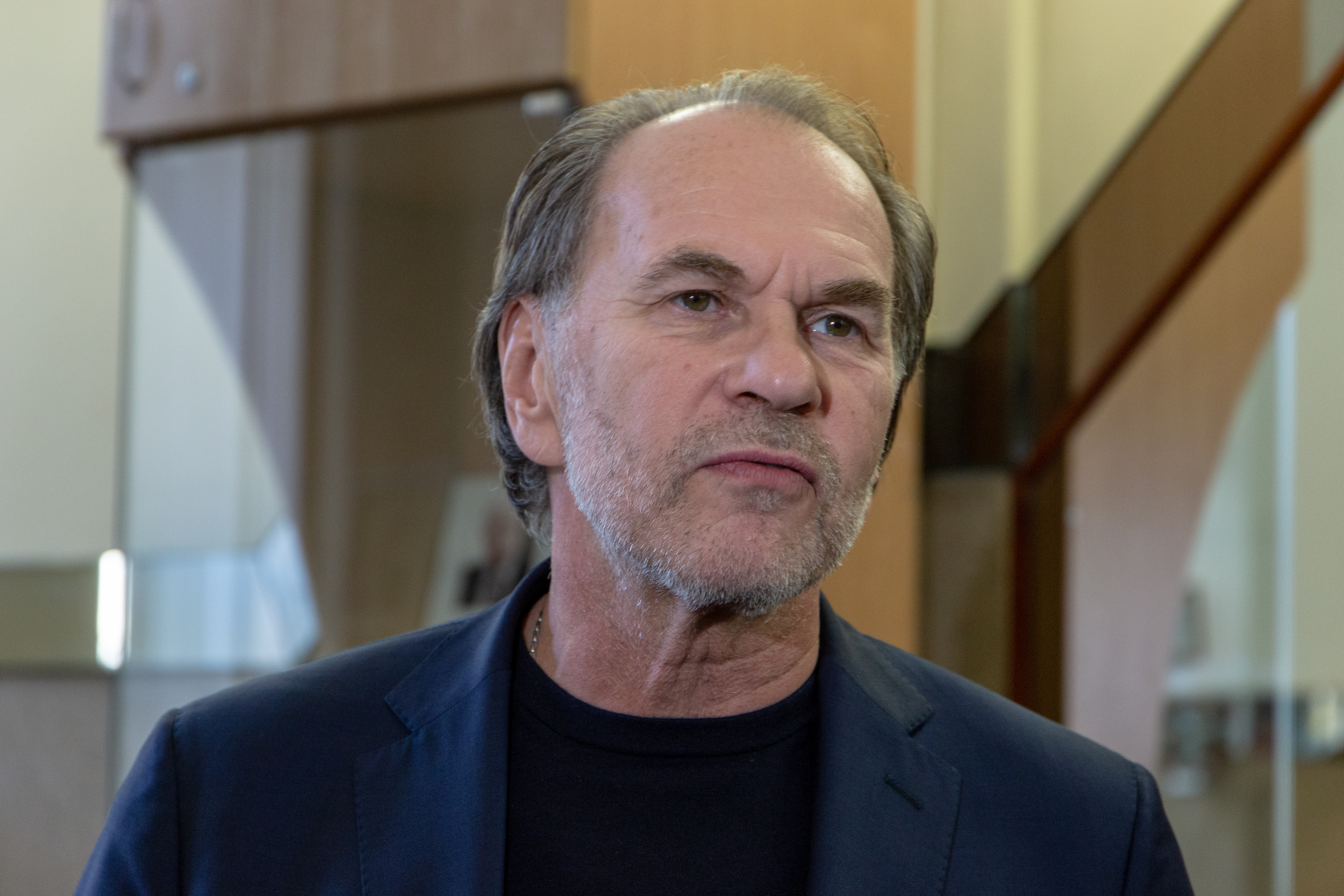
- Aleksei Guskov in 2018
- Born: Aleksei Gennadyevich Guskov; 20 May 1958 (age 68); Brzeg, Opole Voivodeship, Polish People's Republic
- Citizenship: Soviet Union; Russia
- Education: Moscow Art Theatre School
- Occupations: Actor, producer
- Years active: 1985–present

Aleksei Gennadyevich Guskov (Russian: Алексе́й Генна́дьевич Гусько́в, born 20 May 1958) is a Soviet and Russian actor and producer. He was awarded People's Artist of Russia in 2007.

== Early life ==
Aleksei Guskov was born to Russian parents on 20 May 1958 in Brzeg, Opole Voivodeship, Polish People's Republic (now Poland), where his father - a military pilot - was stationed. Soon the family moved to Kiev in the Soviet Union. After high school in Moscow, he entered the Bauman Moscow State Technical University. He studied at this school for nearly five years, but in 1979 dropped out and entered the Moscow Art Theatre School, from which he graduated in 1983 (course of Viktor Monyukov).

He started his acting career at the Moscow Drama Theater. A.Pushkin, where he worked from 1984 to 1986. In 1986-1988 - actor theater on Malaya Bronnaya, in 1988-1991 - Theater "Detective", then - Actor Theater. Nikolai Gogol. Currently Aleksei work at the Vakhtangov State Academic Theatre. For four years he taught acting at the Moscow Art Theater School. He played more than 50 roles in movies.

Since 1994 he is president of the animation studio "F.A.F. Entertainment".

In 2000 he starred in one of his most famous and prominent roles - The border guard-smuggler Nikita Goloschekin in the series A. Mitta "The Border. Taiga Romance". He also served as one of the producers of the picture.

== Political career ==
Guskov has been a member of the United Russia party since 2003. He is a member of the party's Moscow Regional Political Council. In March 2014, he supported the annexation of Crimea and signed a letter to Russian President Vladimir Putin in support of the annexation. On 6 February 2016, he became a member of the party's General Council. In 2018, he was a trusted representative of Moscow mayoral candidate Sergey Sobyanin.

At the end of 2020, Guskov was included in the list of persons threatening the national security of Ukraine because he "disseminates narratives in accordance with Kremlin propaganda in support of Russia's actions." In 2024, he became a trusted representative of Russian presidential candidate Vladimir Putin.

== Personal life ==
Was married to Tatyana (divorced), daughter Natalya Guskova.

Wife Lydia Velezheva, Russian actress of the "State Academic Theatre named after E. Vakhtangov", two sons Vladimir Guskov and Dmitry Guskov.

== Selected filmography ==
Film
Year	Title	Role	Notes
1985	The Private Case of Judge Ivanova	Vladimir Klimov, a neighbor of Olga Nikolaevna	
1986	Plumbum, or The Dangerous Game	school teacher	
1991	Wolfhound	Shura Volkov "Musician"	
1992-94	Hot and others	Pavel Borovsky	TV series
1995	Bonanza	Harry, chief guard of mining companies	
1995	Single player	Spirkin	
1996-97	Strawberry	district Nezabudko	TV series
1998	Classic	Juriy	
1999-00	Simple Truth	Igor, psychologist	TV series
2000	The boundary. Taiga roman	Nikita Goloshchekin, captain	TV mini-series
2001	Scavenger	Nikolay, scavenger	
2001	Garbage Man		
2001	Suspicion	Andrey Danilov, the investigator	TV movie
2002	On the other side Volkov	The Unknown	TV mini-series
2002	Vovochka	dad Vovochki	
2003	Land	Prokhorov, acceptance inspector	TV series
2003	Diary of a Murderer	Aleksei	TV series
2004	Ragin	Andrey Ragin	
2005	The Turkish Gambit	Kazanzaki	
2005	Hunting for elk	Cheryaga	TV mini-series
2006	Enchanted land	Prokhorov	TV series
2006	Infidelity	Petr Kozhemyakin, Major General	TV movie
2006	Russian money	Vasily golden eagle, a landowner neighbor Kupavina	
2006	Tanker "Tango"	Peter Arturovich Captain 2nd Rank	
2007	1814	Frolov	
2007	Saboteur 2: End the war	Oleg, "Sherstyanschik"	TV mini-series
2007	Father	Alexey Ivanov	
2008	Streetracers	Mokhov	
2008	He Who Puts Out the Light	Petr Moiseev	
2009	Le Concert	Andreï Filipov	
2010	The Weather Station	Andrey Vedyankin, investigator	
2010	Tula Tokarev	Vasily Tokarev, Artem's father, Lt. Col.	TV series
2010	Good weather	Andrey	
2010	White sand	Volegov	
2011	Love-Carrot 3	Edik	
2011	4 Days in May	Pavel, Captain	
2012	Kraplenyy		TV series
2012	August Eighth	Kazbek Nikolaevich	
2012	The White Guard	Malyshev, Colonel	TV series
2012	Coma	Valera Pustovalov	
2013	Thirst	Nikolay, Kostya's Father	
2013	Love for Love	Dr. Dolin	TV mini-series
2014	Do not leave me		TV mini-series
2015	Mädchen im Eis	Wsewolod Starych	German film
2015	Godsend	Trofim Rusanov	
2016	Mata Hari	George Lada	TV series
2016	The Confessions	Russian Minister Alexey Berzev	
2016	L'idéal	_	2016. GIFT in tbilisi, artistic documentary film by shota kalandadze
2016	Polina	Bojinski	
2018	Elephant	Valentin Shubin	
2019	Union of Salvation	Prince Aleksei Shcherbatov	
2019	The Port		
2019	Lev Yashin. The Goalee of My Dreams	Michail Yakushin	
2020	The Silver Skates	Minister Nikolai Nikolaevich Vyazemsky	
2020	Nebesnaya komanda		
2023	The Master and Margarita	Baron Maigel	
2025	Zloy gorod	Daniil	
2026	Rise of the Empire	Boris Sheremetev	
