= Elephant (2019 film) =

- Directed by: Aleksey Krasovskiy
- Written by: Aleksey Krasovskiy
- Starring: Frédéric Beigbeder; Aleksei Guskov; Ingrid Olerinskaya; Yan Tsapnik; Evgeniya Dmitrieva
- Cinematography: Sergey Astakhov
- Release date: September 19, 2019
- Country: Russia
- Language: Russian

Elephant (Russian: Элефант) is a 2019 Russian comedy-drama film directed and written by Aleksey Krasovskiy. It stars Aleksei Guskov.

== Plot ==
The film tells about the writer, Valentin Shubin, the author of the world-famous series of books about the Elephant Bear, going through a creative crisis.

== Cast ==
- Aleksei Guskov as Valentin Shubin
- Ingrid Olerinskaya as Tanya
- Yan Tsapnik as Roman
- Frédéric Beigbeder as Vincent Amari
- Evgeniya Dmitrieva as Ada
- Yuliya Topolnitskaya as Nurse
- Igor Khripunov as Gangster
- Vera Gudkova as Selfie-girl
- Ivan Efremov as Doctor
- Polina Agureeva as Taisia
