= Saving Leningrad =

2019 film by Aleksei Kozlov

- Theatrical release poster
- Directed by: Aleksey Kozlov
- Written by: Aleksey Kozlov
- Produced by: Aleksey Kozlov; Arkady Fateev; Anton Dementiev; Elena Gromova
- Starring: Maria Melnikova; Andrey Mironov-Udalov; Gela Meskhi; Anastasiya Melnikova; Valeriy Degtyar; Vitali Kishchenko; Aleksey Shevchenkov; Boris Shcherbakov
- Cinematography: Aleksey Doronkin; Gleb Vavilov
- Edited by: Anton Dementiev; Aleksey Maklakov
- Music by: Yuri Poteyenko
- Production companies: Studio AVK; Algous studio
- Distributed by: Universal Pictures Russia; All Media Company; NTV
- Release date: January 27, 2019 (Russia)
- Running time: 96 minutes
- Country: Russia
- Language: Russian
- Budget: ₽237 million
- Box office: ₽202 million $3,068,838

Saving Leningrad, also known as Battle of Leningrad (Russian: Спасти Ленинград) is a 2019 Russian war drama film written about the Road of Life, the tragedy of blood "barge 752", which took place on the night of September 16 to 17, 1941, at Lake Ladoga. During the evacuation of people from Leningrad, the barge was bombed by Nazi warplanes and went to the bottom, killing more than 1,000 people. At the same time, 460 people were killed in a barge towed by the gunship, "Selemdzha", which was carrying fuel and military supplies to Leningrad. Few were saved. The film takes place during the Eastern Front in World War II and focuses on the beginning of the Siege of Leningrad.

The film was directed by Aleksey Kozlov, who co-wrote the screenplay and produced by Arkady Fateev. It stars Maria Melnikova as Nastya Tkachyova, Andrey Mironov-Udalov as cadet Kostya Gorelov, as well as Gela Meskhi, Anastasiya Melnikova in their debut cinematic roles.

Saving Leningrad was released in the Russian Federation by Universal Pictures International on January 27, 2019, on the eve of the 75th anniversary of the lifting of the blockade in Saint Petersburg (Then, Leningrad).

== Background ==
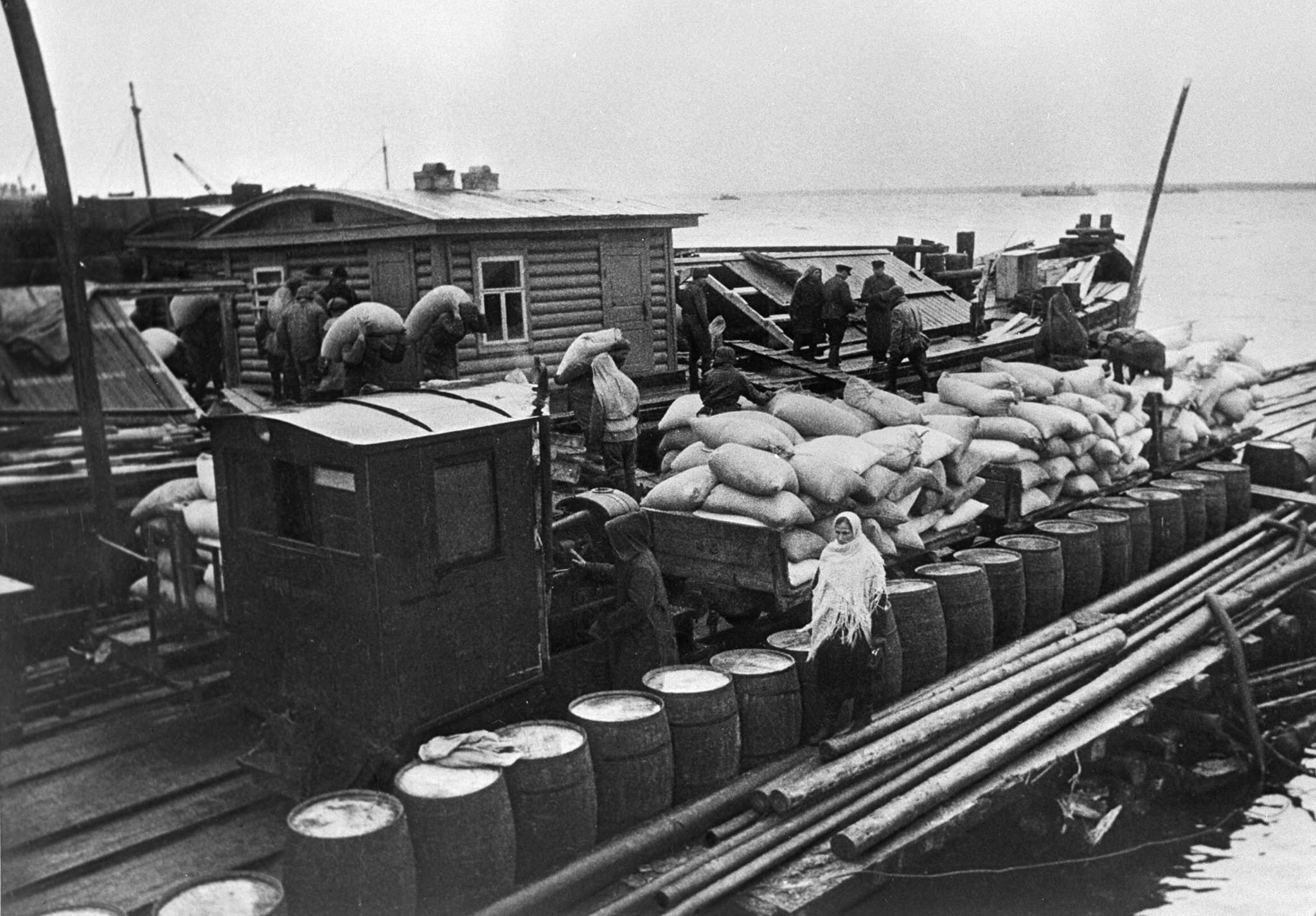
Foodstuffs delivered to besieged Leningrad on a barge on Lake Ladoga.

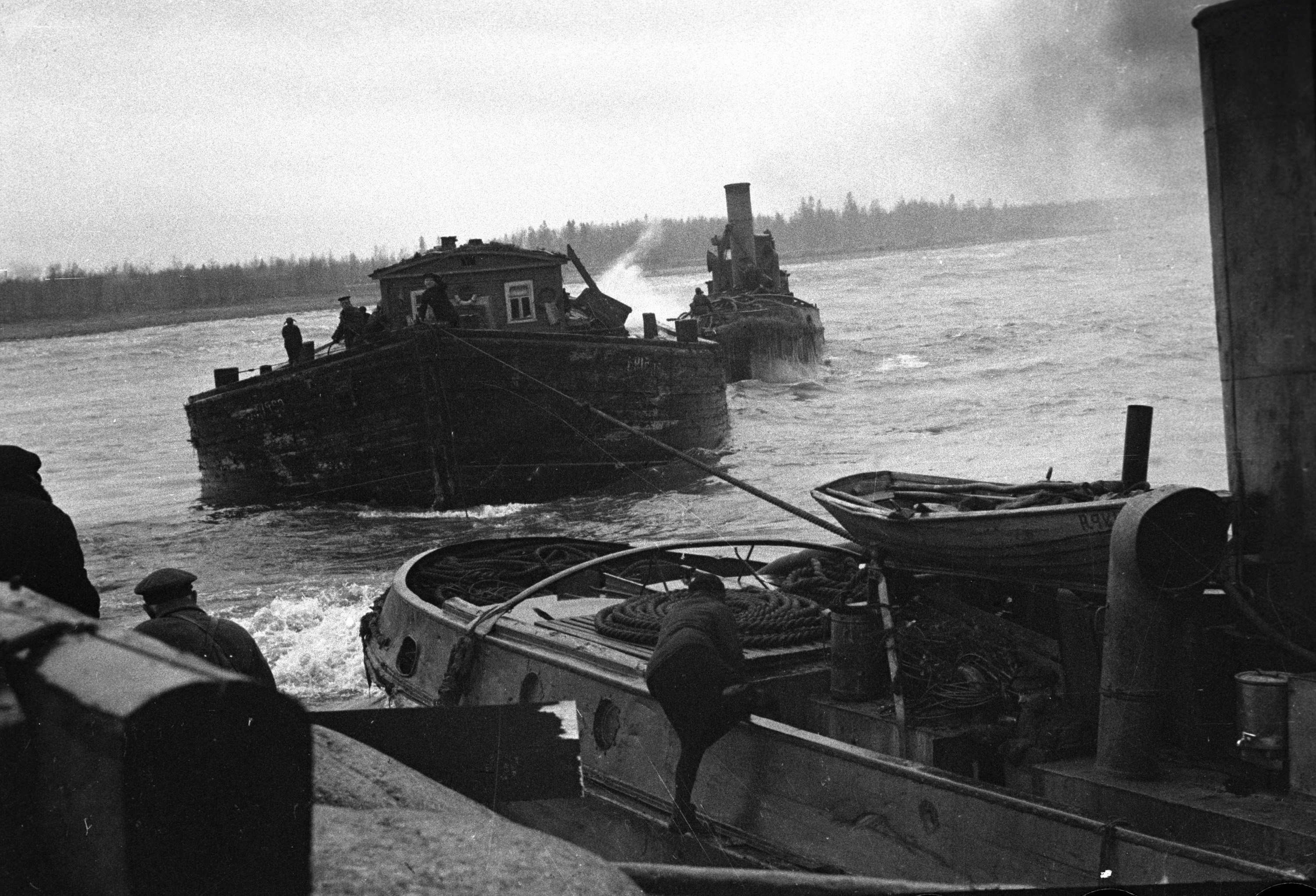
Cutters carrying foodstuffs to besieged Leningrad on Lake Ladoga.

Leningraders, sent to evacuation in Lake Ladoga, became victims of flooding of the barge at number 752. (ru)

A story based on real events of the imprint of barge number 752 which was used as a fishing boat and supplied food to the besieged Leningrad on the Road of life. On the night of September 17, 1941, during the evacuation of people from Leningrad, the barge leaked and sank in the depths of the Ladoga Lake with a thousand people on it. At the same time, 460 people died on a barge towed by the boat "Selemzha", which carried military reinforcements to Leningrad. Together with "Selemzha", The boat "Oryol" helped to tow the barge and together they managed to save 240 people, 216 and 24 people respectively. A total of 433 cadets, 132 graduates of the Military Medical Academy, 8 junior officers, 36 officers and 46 women, as well as all those who were on the barge with their children and 30 civilian workers and members of the Naval Medical Academy and the Navy's Hydrographic Administration, which included more than 685 people.

In addition, a whole class of cadets of the Leningrad Military School of Engineering and the students of the vocational school, along with officers, women and all the children and technical and artillery personnel who were with them, perished. Among those who survived were 184 people (160 who were brought to the Oryol and 24 to the Selemzha), which belonged to the Naval Medical Academy and the Navy's Hydrographic Administration, and another 56 civilians.

== Plot ==
In the Soviet Union during September 1941 there was an emergency evacuation of people from Leningrad across Lake Ladoga. By a twist of fate, a young couple, cadet-gunner Kostya Gorelov and his girlfriend Nastya Tkachyova, are on board the dilapidated barge 752, the purpose of which is the evacuation of the inhabitants of the Siege of Leningrad. The barge is badly worn out, but Nikolai Gorelov, Kostya's father, taking responsibility, ordered it loaded with over 1,000 people, among them his son. Among the evacuees is NKVD investigator Vadim Petruchik, who led the case against Nastya's father.

The case of the repressed father Nastya was reviewed. He was released and sent to the front, to the same section of the front as the barge. The cadets, who were marching to the barge were stopped, and the cadets-gunners were sent to take back the channel.

At night, the ship gets into a storm and suffers disaster. At the site of the tragedy, the first to come are not rescuers, but enemy aircraft.

== Cast ==
- Maria Melnikova as Anastasiya Alexandrovna 'Nastya' Tkachyova
  Nastya Tkachyova, a schoolgirl in Leningrad.
- Andrey Mironov-Udalov as Konstantin Nikolaevich 'Kostya' Gorelov
  Kostya Gorelov graduated from a military school, and a Soviet Army.
- Gela Meskhi as Vadim Petruchik, investigator of the NKVD
- Anastasiya Melnikova as Mariya Nikolaevna Tkachyova, Nastya's mother
- Valeriy Degtyar as Alexandr Naumovich Tkachyov, Nastya's father
- Vitali Kishchenko as Colonel Nikolai Gorelov, Kostya's father
- Aleksey Shevchenkov as Ivan Yerofeyev
- Boris Shcherbakov as chief of staff
- Sergey Zharkov as Gena Bukin, a Soviet Army
- Ivan Lyrchikov as Andrey Babintsev, a Soviet Army
- Yesenia Raevskaya as Pomerantseva
- Vadim Andreyev as Skvortsov
- Inga Strelkova-Oboldina as Galochka, music teacher
- Vladimir Petrov as Sasha
- Vladimir Seleznev as Yarygin
- Mikhail Morozov as Vitya
- Evgenia Lyubimova as Lyusya
- Pavel Grigoriev as Mikhail Efimovich
- Natalya Tkachenko as Liza
- Maria Kapustinskaya as Sveta Goncharova
- Stepan Yakovlev as Seryozha
- Elena Zimina as Zoya

== Production ==
=== Filming ===
The shooting process ran from May through July 2018 and extended 60 shifts. Some of the shooting was done in Moscow, Saint Petersburg and Nizhny Novgorod Oblast.

Filming took place in Saint Petersburg and its environs in May 2018 in collaboration with Lenfilm. In June 2018, additional photographs were taken on the shore of the province of Lake Ilmen in the Novgorod Oblast.

== Release ==
Saving Leningrad was released in the Russian Federation by Universal Pictures Russia on January 27, 2019.

== Reception ==
The film received average ratings from film critics. On the Megacritic website it scored 5.8 points out of 10 according to 12 reviews. InterMedia columnist Denis Stupnikov wrote: "The film becomes a hymn to mutual assistance, thanks to which realistically outlined the shortcomings of each character in the end completely leveled".

Others criticized the film for poor acting, primitive direction, inconsistency with real events, illogical behavior of characters, poor ragged editing, and a disjointed script. The film failed at the box office.

== See also ==
- Attack on Leningrad (2009 film)
