= Mariya Lugovaya =

Russian actress and theater star (born 1987)

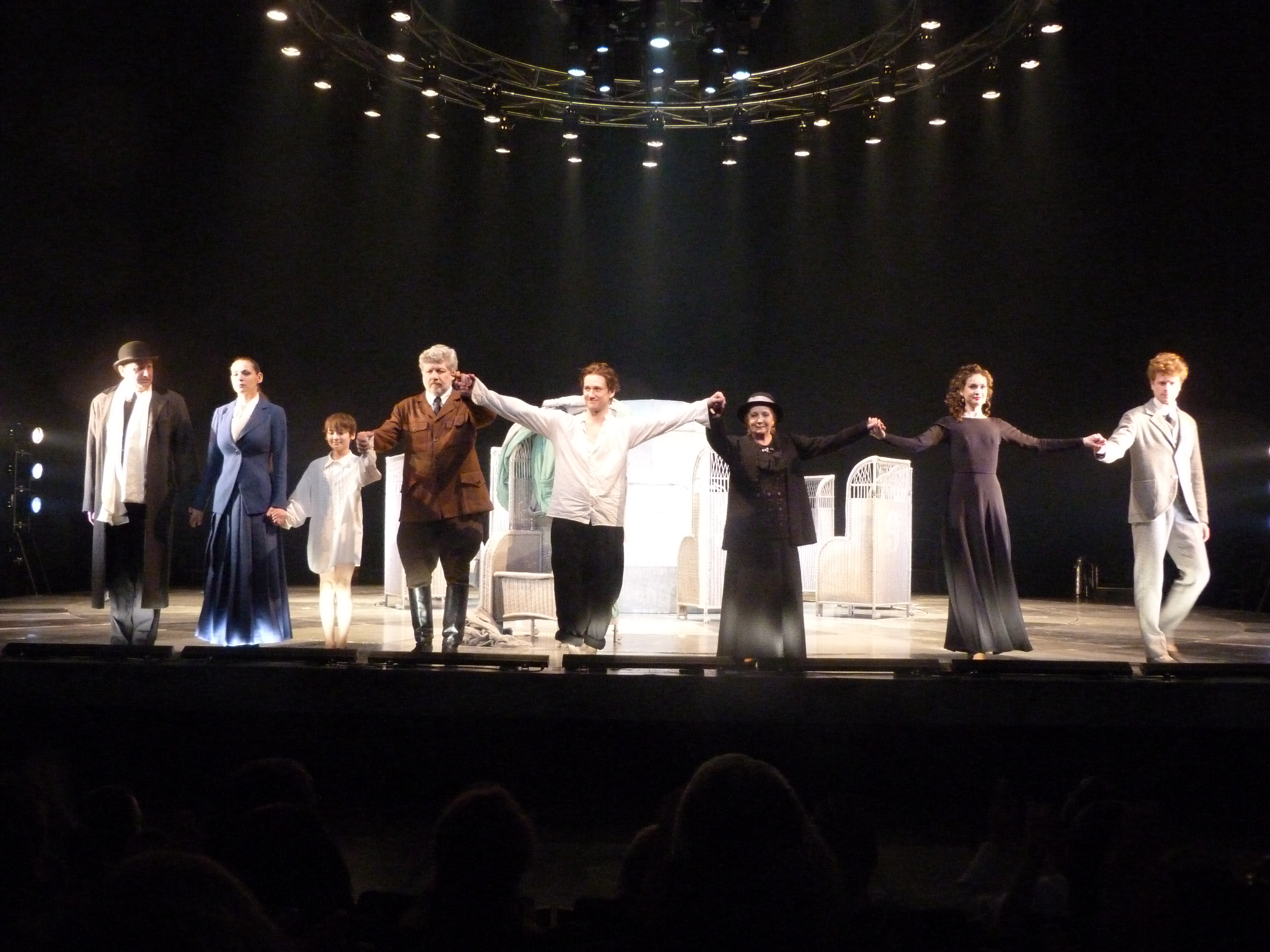
- Mariya Lugovaya at the Madách International Theatre Meeting in 2014
- Born: Mariya Aleksandrovna Lugovaya; 23 July 1987 (age 38); Leningrad, RSFSR, USSR
- Occupation: Actress
- Years active: 2005–present

Mariya Aleksandrovna Lugovaya (Russian: Мария Александровна Луговая; born July 23, 1987) is a Russian actress and theater star, best known for playing Tasya Lapina in 2008 television series Ginger, and her lead role as Marusya Klimova in the 2017 television series Murka (ru).

== Early life ==
Mariya Lugovaya was born in Leningrad, Russian SFSR, Soviet Union (now Saint Petersburg, Russia).

Her parents worked as teachers of philosophy. From early childhood, Mariya was engaged in ballroom dancing and music, studied at music school.

In 2008 she graduated from the Russian State Institute of Performing Arts, then moved to Moscow. and from 2008, she played at the Alexandrin Theatre.

== Acting career ==
Mariya began to star in the television Favorsky in 2005, but became famous in 2008 as a blind pianist Tasya Lapina from the television series Ginger.

Lugovaya played her lead role as Marusya Klimova in the 2017 television series Murka, which is about the corrupt world of Odessa in the 1920s.

In 2019, Lugovaya played the character 'Lara' (Larisa Kuras) in the Netflix TV series Better than Us, who was attempting to sell the robot Arisa in order to pay for a surgical operation on her life-threatening brain tumour.

== Personal ==
Since January 2018 she has been in a relationship with the actor Sergey Lavygin. The couple married in January 2020. Their daughter, Marta, was born in June 2022.

== Filmography ==
Year	Title	Role	Notes
2005	Favorsky	Julia	
2007	18-14	Nastasia	
2007	Hounds	Tonya	
2007	Sagittarius Era	Dasha Gladysheva	
2007	Sea Devils 2	Katya	
2008	Junker	Zeena	
2008	Kamenskaya 5	Lera Nemchinova	
2008–2009	Who was Shakespeare	Ophelia	Кто был Шекспиром
2010	Redhead or Red	Tasya	Рыжая
2011	In the Forests and On the Mountains (TV series)	Praskovya Potapna, daughter of Chapurin	В лесах и горах
2011	The White Guard (TV series)	Irina Nay-Turs	(8 episodes)
2012	Zoyka's Love	Zoya/Victoria	
2013	Jamaica	Margo	Джамайка
2013	No Right to Choose	Katerina	Без права на выбор
2013	Yolki 3 (Christmas Trees 3)	Masha	Елки 3
2014	World Third	Zinaida	Третья мировая
2016	Bess (TV series)	Dasha Shatova	Бесы
2016	Investigator Tikhonov	Katya	Следователь Тихонов
2017	Our Happy Tomorrow	Olga Klenowska	Наше счастливое завтра
2017	Murka	Marusya Klimova	(main role)
2018	The Devil's Hunt	Anna Yartseva, NKVD agent	Охота на дьявола
2019	Better Than Us	Larisa "Lara" Kuras	Лучше, чем люди
2021	Mariya. Spasti Moskvu	Mariya	Мария. Спасти Москву
