= Vitali Kishchenko =

Soviet and Russian actor

- Виталий Кищенко
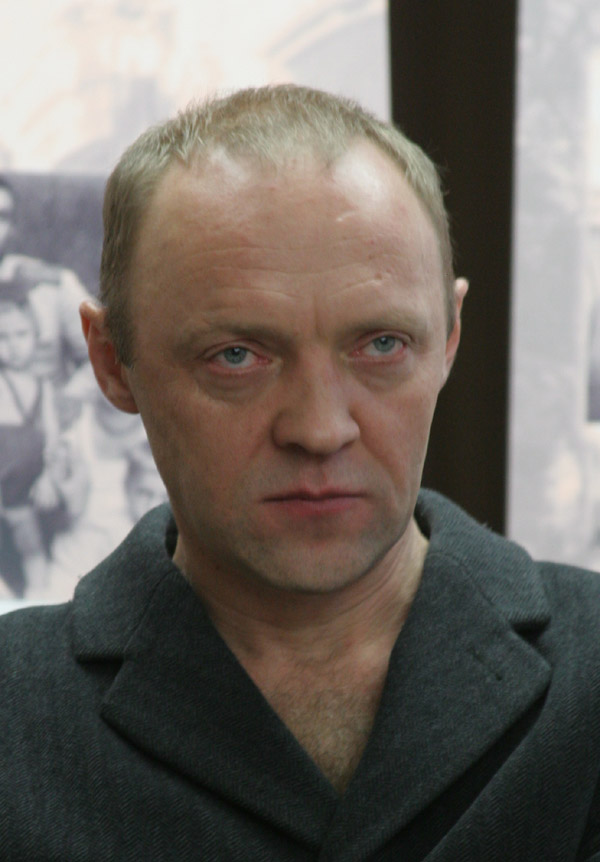
- Kishchenko in 2012
- Born: Vitali Eduardovich Kishchenko; May 25, 1964 (age 62); Krasnoyarsk, RSFSR, USSR
- Citizenship: Soviet Union (until 1991); Russia
- Occupation: Actor
- Years active: 1988–present

Vitali Eduardovich Kishchenko (Russian: Вита́лий Эдуа́рдович Ки́щенко; born May 25, 1964) is a Soviet and Russian actor. He was awarded the Merited Artist of the Russian Federation in 2005. Vitali appeared in more than 70 films.

== Biography ==
Vitali Kishchenko was born in Krasnoyarsk, Russian SFSR, Soviet Union. He studied at the Krasnoyarsk State Institute of Arts, after which he worked at the Krasnoyarsk State Theater for Young Spectators, the Kaliningrad Regional Drama Theater, the Omsk State Academic Drama Theater and the Kaliningrad Regional Youth Theater Molodezhny. Since 2003, Vitaly has been actively acting in films.

== Selected filmography ==
Year	Title	Role	Notes
2007	The Banishment	German	
2008	The Ghost	Sergei Snesarev	
2009	The Miracle	Vasily Pershin	
2012	White Tiger	Major Fedotov	
2014	Sunstroke		
2017	Matilda	Grand Duke Vladimir Alexandrovich	
2017	Anna Karenina: Vronsky's Story	Karenin	
2019	Saving Leningrad	Colonel Nikolai Gorelov	
2019	Union of Salvation	Alexander I of Russia	
2019	Leaving Afghanistan	Lieutenant General Vasiliev	
