= Ilya Malakov =

Russian actor (born 1990)

- Илья Малаков
- Born: Ilya Sergeevich Malakov; 2 October 1990 (age 35); Ryazan, Russian SFSR, Soviet Union
- Education: Moscow Provincial Theater
- Occupation: Actor
- Years active: 2013–present

Ilya Sergeevich Malakov (Russian: Илья Сергеевич Малаков; born 2 October 1990) is a Russian theater and film actor. He is best known for his role in the film Furious (2017).

== Early life ==
Malakov was born in Ryazan, Russian SFSR, Soviet Union (now Russia). In his school years he studied Greco-Roman wrestling. He graduated from a specialized school with in-depth study of English. Then he entered the Ryazan State University named for S. A. Yesenin to the Department of Informatics and English. His parents received their education in the same university. In RSU he participated in the games of KVN for the university team, also tried his hand at dancing.

During his studies at the Ryazan State University, in his final year met Tatyana Yakovlevna Korobkova, his school teacher of the subject Culture of Language, who saw theatrical talent even earlier in Ilya Malakov. She even suggested that he try himself as an actor. She helped prepare Malakov for admission. One of the reasons for his wish to be admitted to the theater was the performance "Hooligan" starring Sergey Bezrukov, which he saw in 2011 in the Ryazan Philharmonic.

After graduating from the Ryazan State University named for S. A. Yesenin, he went to Moscow to enter the theater - he submitted documents to five leading theatrical universities. As a result, he was in the All-Russian State University of Cinematography named after S. A. Gerasimov, on the course Aleksandr Mikhailov.

In the first year of the Gerasimov Institute of Cinematography, his acquaintance with Sergey Bezrukov and Ilya Malakov was casting in his theater. Then he worked for a long time under the guidance of Bezrukov in entreprises, in particular Freddie played in the production of "My Fair and Unhappy Lady" (2013). When Sergey Bezrukov rose at the helm of the Moscow Provincial Theater, he noted the talent of the young actor and in 2014 invited him to the troupe of the Moscow Provincial Theater.

== Career ==
Since 2013, he made his screen debut on the TV series The Ship on the channel STS, in which he played the role of Egor. Then he played in the films The Village Teacher (2015) eleventh-grader Nikolay Agafonov and The Lords of Dreams (2015) a role of Grisha.

His first lead role was of Evpaty Kolovrat in the historical and adventure fantasy Furious directed by Ivan Shurkhovetskiy, released on big screens in 2017. The picture takes place in 13th century fragmented Rus.

== Filmography ==
List of film credits
Year	Title	Role	Notes
2013	Complicated story		Short film
2015	The Lords of Dreams	Grisha	
2017	Furious	Evpaty Kolovrat	
2018	Lily		
2021	Maria. Save Moscow	Sergeant	
2025	August	Captain Nikolaev	

List of television credits
Year	Title	Role	Notes
2014–15	The Ship	Egor	(ru)
2015	The Village Teacher	Nikolay Agafonov	
2018	Operation Mukhabbat	Mitya Saveliev	
2018	The Big Game	Lesha Grishin, national team player	Before the 2018 FIFA World Cup
2019	USSR		
2019	Another's Life	Sergey	
