= Mariya Fomina =

Russian theater and film actress

- Мария Фомина
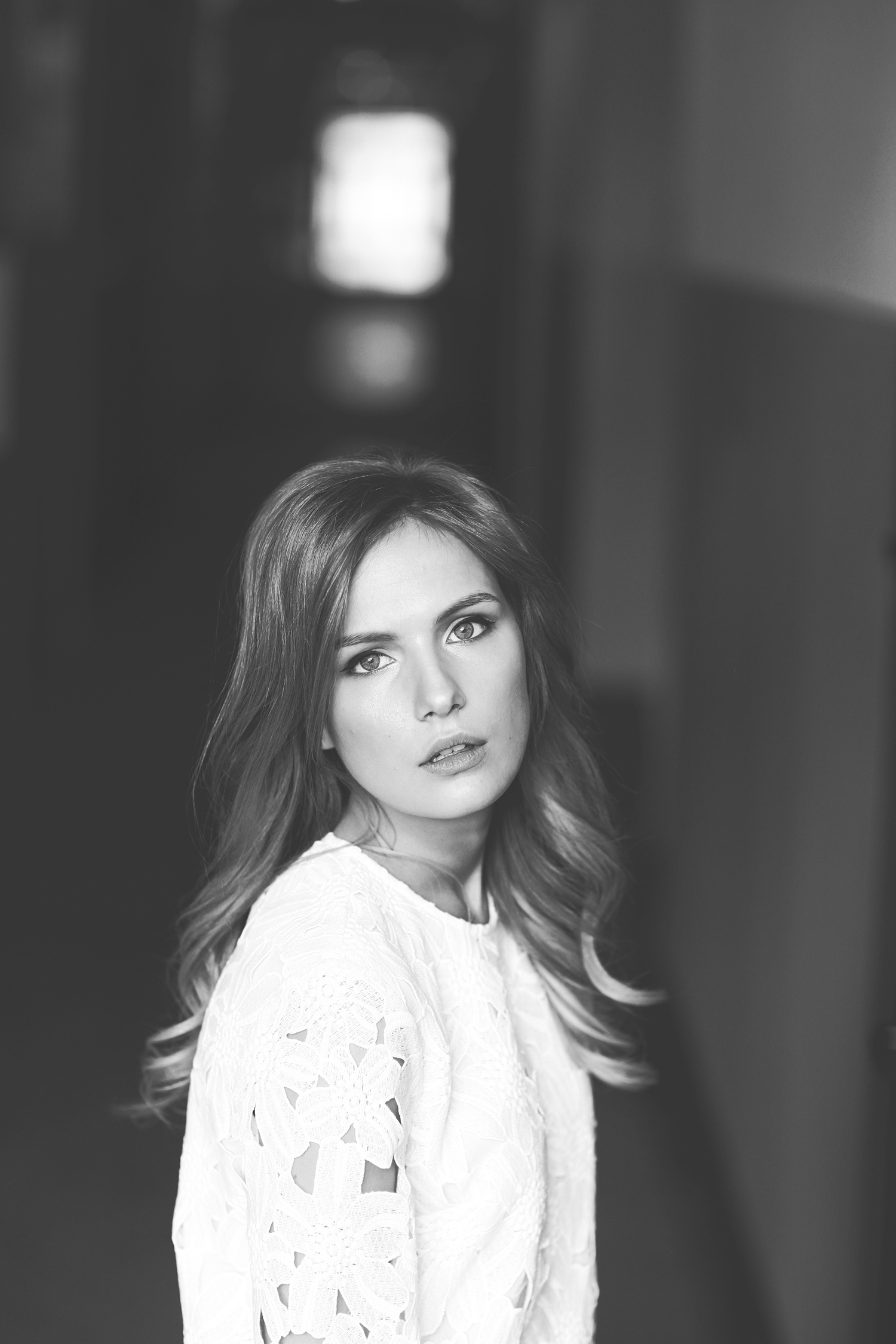
- Mariya Fomina
- Born: Mariya Aleksandrovna Fomina; 1 March 1993 (age 33); Moscow, Russia
- Education: GITIS
- Occupation: Actress
- Years active: 2004–present

Mariya Aleksandrovna Fomina (Russian: Мария Александровна Фомина; born 1 March 1993) is a Russian theater and film actress.

== Early life ==
Mariya Fomina was born in Moscow, Russia. From an early age she was engaged in choreography and ballet - she dreamed of becoming a ballerina. With the children, Mariya was engaged in ballet at the Moscow State Academy of Choreography.

Also in school years was fond of diving. When Mariya was 11 years old, she was casting for the film Daddy (2004) by Vladimir Mashkov and Mariya's father advised her to try for an episodic role. And she did it. After the first shooting experience, she firmly decided to become an actress. Also in school years Mariya featured in several more films: Potapov, to the board! (2007), My team (2007).

Since 2004, she studied at Irina Feofanova's children's theater studio in Igor Yatsko's group. In the senior classes I studied at the preparatory courses of the Moscow Art Theatre School.

In 2010, entered the Russian Academy of Theatre Arts - GITIS, which she graduated in 2014, the workshop of Oleg Kudryashov. While studying at RATI-GITIS she played in the productions: "The Village of Peremilovo"; "Eugene Onegin"; "AURORA"; "What`s the buzz"; "AT. OL K" (Here She is Love What); "IU and YES"; "Love story".

From 2014 to 2016 she played at the Theatre of Nations, among her works: "#soneetsekspira" directed by T. Kulyabin; "Yvonne, Princess of Burgundy" director G. Yazhin.

Since 2016 - an actress in the internship group of the Moscow Art Theater named after A. Chekhov, was engaged in performances: Elizabeth II "Jubilee of the Jeweler" director O. Tabakov and K. Bogomolov; Matilda - "North Wind" director R. Litvinov.

== Personal life ==
Between 2015 and 2016, she was in a relationship with Russian actor Pavel Tabakov.

In 2018, she married film producer and businessman Alexei Kiselyov, who is also the son of Russian and Ukrainian TV presenter Yevgeny Kiselyov. On 15 August 2018, she gave birth to a daughter, who was named Anna.

== Filmography ==
=== Films ===
List of film credits
Year	Title	Role	Notes
2004	Daddy	girl with balls	
2006	Chyortovo koleso	Vika	
2007	Potapov, to the board!	Lena Sinitsyna	
2007	My team	Alla	
2008	Twice in the same river	Olya	
2014	Block 18	Sveta	(ru)
2015	Queen of Spades: The Dark Rite	courier	
2016	Our Kind of Traitor	Anna	
2017	Furious	Byzantine princess Eupraxia of Ryazan	
	What the French Don't Talk About		
	Eternal cold		

=== TV Series ===
List of television credits
Year	Title	Role	Notes
2007	Trace	Varya Golinskaya	
2008	Daddy's Daughters	Albina Romanova	
2009	Brothers	Yana	
2010	Day of despair	Liza	TV
2011	Amazon	Karina	(ru)
2015	Red Queen	Mila Romanovskaya, model	(ru)
2015	Adult daughters	Vera	
2017	Mata Hari	Vera Semihina	
2019	Gold Diggers	Marina Levkoyeva	
