= Furious (film) =

2017 Russian period action film

- Theatrical release poster
- Directed by: Dzhanik Fayziev; Ivan Shurkhovetsky
- Screenplay by: Sergey Yudakov; Yevgeny Raevsky; Dmitry Raevsky; Dzhanik Fayziev
- Produced by: Dzhanik Fayziev; Rafael Minasbekyan; Pavel Stepanov; Aleksandr Bondarev; Aleksey Neklyudov; Tatiana Vengerova; Nadezhda Kovalevichs
- Starring: Ilya Malakov; Polina Chernyshova; Aleksei Serebryakov; Aleksandr Ilyin Jr.; Yulia Khlynina; Igor Savochkin; Timofey Tribuntsev; Andrey Burkovsky; Mariya Fomina
- Cinematography: Maksim Osadchy
- Edited by: Rod Nikolaychuk; Dmitry Slobtsov
- Music by: Serj Tankian
- Production companies: Central Partnership; Production Centre IVAN; Film Studio KIT
- Distributed by: Central Partnership
- Release date: November 30, 2017 (Russia)
- Running time: 117 minutes
- Country: Russia
- Languages: Russian, Mongolian
- Budget: ₽360 million $5,610,000
- Box office: ₽593.2 million; $10,433,259 (total amount); $10,796,309 (Russia/CIS)

Furious, also known as Legend of Kolovrat (Russian: Легенда о Коловрате, romanized: Legenda o Kolovrate, pronounced [lʲɪˈɡʲɛndɐ ɐ kəlɐˈvratʲɪ]), is a 2017 Russian epic period action film directed by Dzhanik Fayziev and Ivan Shurkhovetsky. The film stars newcomer Ilya Malakov as the legendary Ryazan bogatyr Evpaty Kolovrat, as well as Polina Chernyshova, Aleksei Serebryakov, Aleksandr Ilyin Jr. and Yulia Khlynina in supporting roles.

The plot is based on The Tale of the Destruction of Ryazan, a legend about the Siege of Ryazan by the Mongols, which approached Ancient Rus' in 1237, centered around the medieval knight Evpaty Kolovrat.

Furious was theatrically released in Russia by Central Partnership on November 30, 2017.

== Plot ==
The story is based on the legend of bogatyr Evpaty Kolovrat, as recorded in the 16th-century Tale of the Destruction of Ryazan, which is one of the best sources of the Mongol invasion of Russia. In the prologue, a young Evpaty is overpowered by a band of Mongols in the aftermath of the Battle of the Kalka River (1223) and left for dead. He is given his nickname of Kolovrat ("spinning wheel") by Nastya, his later wife, for his dual wielding of two swords in a circular motion.

In the present day, in 1236, Evpaty is a knight in the service of prince Yuri of Ryazan. The Mongol army, led by the grandson of Genghis Khan, Batu Khan, once again approaches Ryazan in 1237. Warned of their approach, Prince Fedor leads a party of envoys, including Evpaty, to negotiate with the Khan. Recognizing Evpaty's boldness, the Khan gives him a talisman that allows its bearer safe conduct through the Mongol lines. Unfortunately, the Mongols turn on their visitors and Fedor is killed, but Evpaty and several soldiers manage to escape. When they return to Ryazan, the city has already been destroyed by the horde.

Evpaty gathers a detachment and leads it to delay the Mongol army, hoping that the neighboring Russian princes will be able to send support, but no help is forthcoming. He also details one of his soldiers, Karkun, to escort the women and children who survived the destruction of the city to safety.

In a last stand, Evpaty and his comrades are defending a fortified hilltop. He manages to kill the Mongol commander Khostovrul, but all the defenders are ultimately killed. Mortally wounded, Evpaty looks down from the hill and sees a sail on the river, showing that their actions delayed the Mongols long enough for Karkun and his charges to escape. Evpaty stumbles to the bottom of the hill and mockingly returns the talisman to the Khan, saying he no longer has need of it, before dying. Batu Khan, impressed by the heroic defense, orders his men to give Evpaty a hero's burial.

An epilogue set in 1242 shows Karkun at the head of the united Novgorod-Vladimir army, exhorting his men to remember Evpaty's noble sacrifice, as they prepare to charge the Teutonic Knights in what will become the Battle on the Ice.

== Cast ==
- Ilya Malakov as Evpaty Kolovrat
  - David Melkonyan as young Evpaty
- Polina Chernyshova as Nastya
  - Diana Pentovich as young Nastya
- Aleksei Serebryakov as Prince Yuri of Ryazan
- Aleksandr Ilyin Jr. as Karkun, a druzhinnik
- Yulia Khlynina as Lada
- Timofey Tribuntsev as Zakhar, the medicine man
- Igor Savochkin as Ratmir, Nastya's father
- Aleksandr Tsoy as Batu Khan
- Sergey Koltakov as Dobromir, a voivode
- Andrey Burkovsky as Rostislav, the Bryansk voivode
- Viktor Proskurin as svyasschennik (priest)

=== Rest of cast listed alphabetically ===
- Olga Drozdova as Princess Agrafena of Ryazan, Prince Yuri's wife
- Ilya Antonenko as Prince Fedor of Ryazan
- Mariya Fomina as Princess Eupraxia of Ryazan, Prince Fedor's wife
- Darya Yartseva as Princess Daria of Ryazan
- Fyodor Lavrov as Prince Igor
- Marta Timofeeva as Zhdana, Evpaty Kolovrat's daughter
- Artemy Padalka as Ivan, Evpaty Kolovrat's son
- Gennady Solovyov as Nikifor
- Anton Shpinkov as Danila
- Sergey Yuyukin as Frol, messenger
- Aleksey Vertkov as Nestor
- Sergey Shaydakov as Putyata
- Artem Bordovsky as Nikita
- Vladimir Lyubimtsev as Guryan Kurya
- Daulet Abdygaporov as Subutai
- Georgiy Pitskhelauri as Khostovrul
- Evgeniy Sangadzhiev as interpreter

== Production ==
=== Development ===
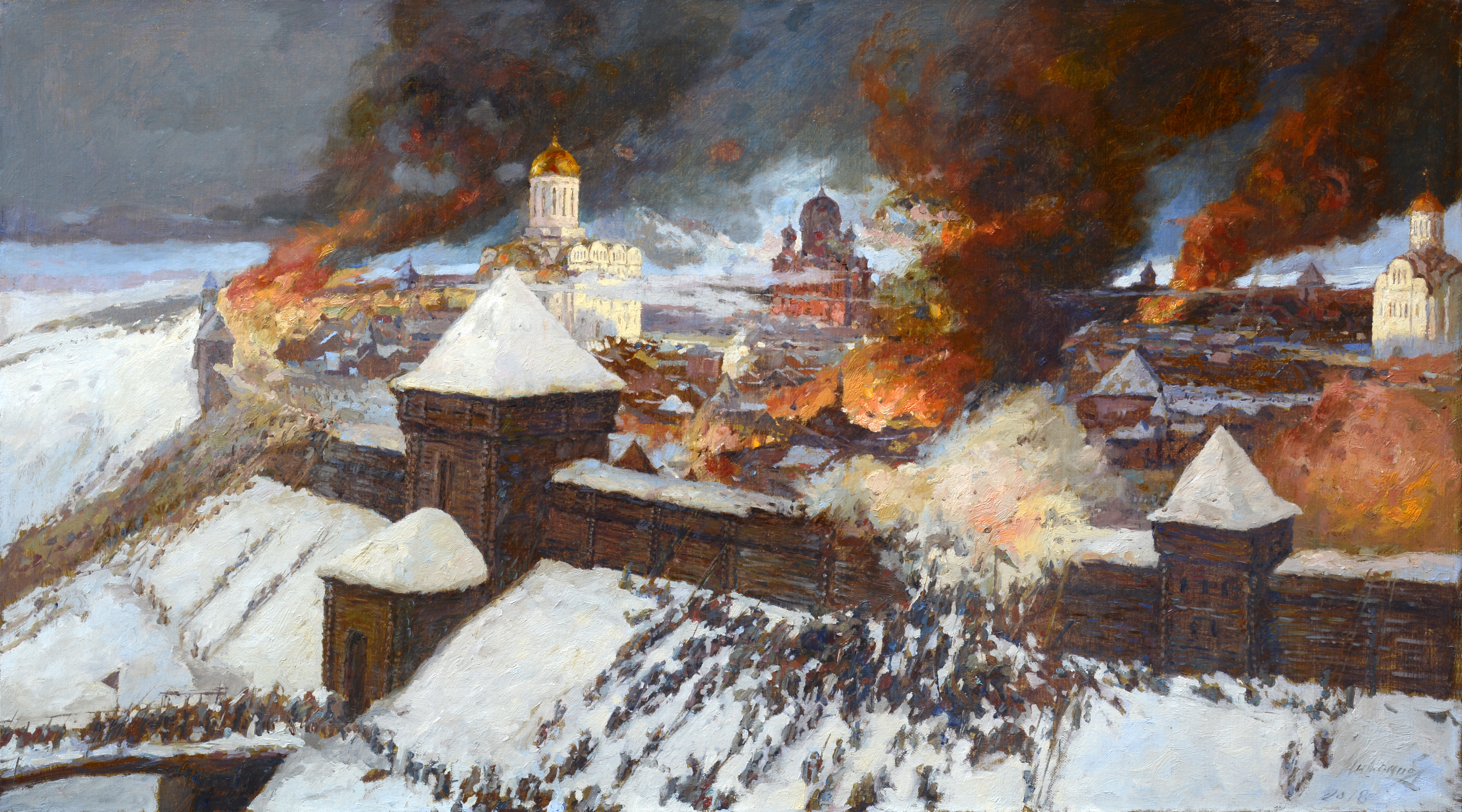
Siege of Ryazan is the "Defense of Ryazan". From a painting by Deshalyta.

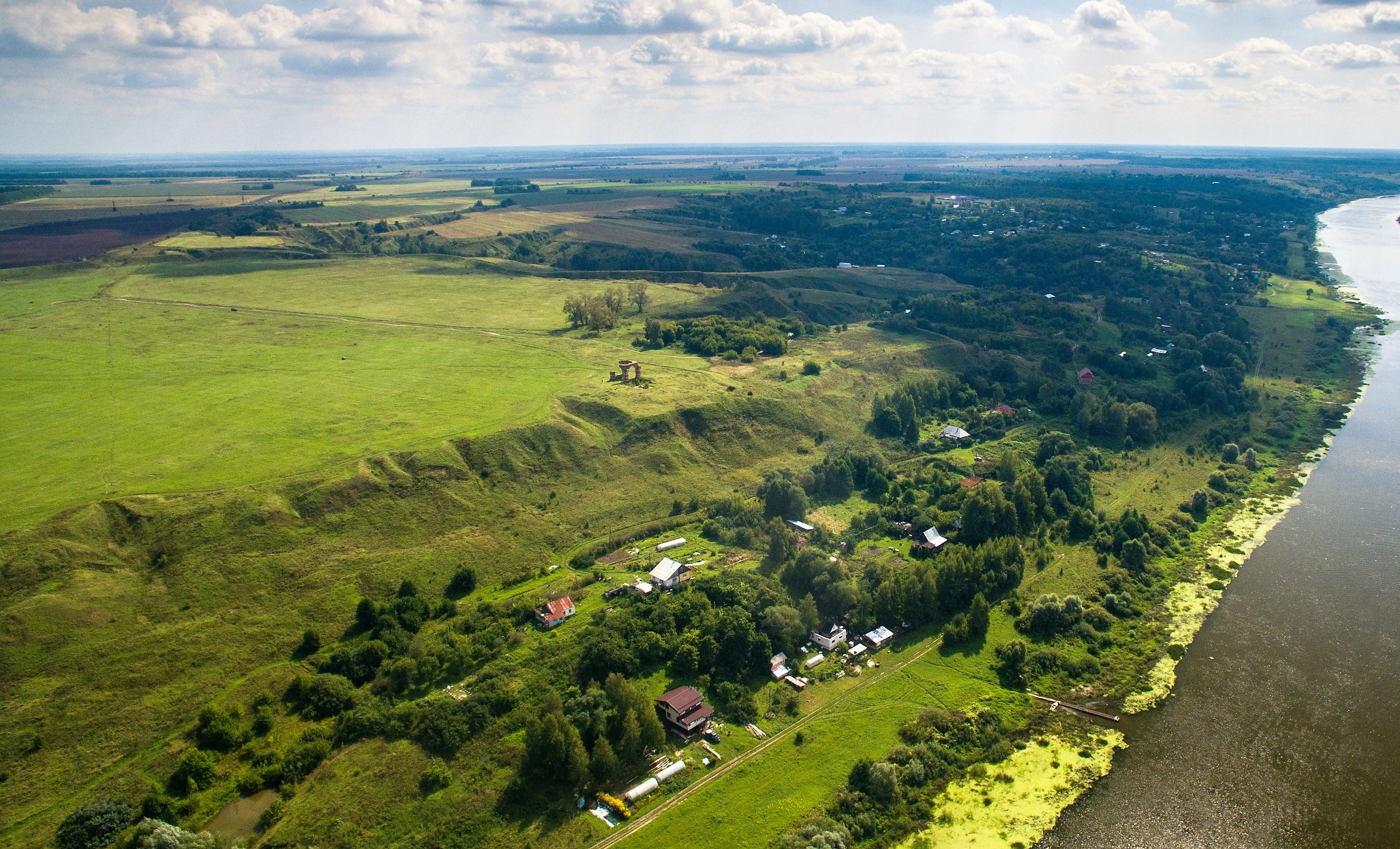
An ancient settlement, the village of Staraya Ryazan fortifications. View from the Oka River. (ru)

From the very beginning of the production, the producers decided not to build an entire photographic site of the 13th century buildings, but to create them using computer effects. This project is the first feature film directed by Ivan Shurkhovetsky.

According to Dzhanik Fayziev, the creators of the film tried to focus not on historical details, but on the feelings and experiences of people who make an ordinary person a hero capable of performing a feat.

"We made an impassioned, energetic, and action-packed film – an incredibly tender, awe-inspiring tale of indomitable courage", said Dzhanik Fayziev, general producer at Russia’s Film Studio KIT. Dzhanik Fayziev said the film blends history with the present day and fantasy with realism to tell an emotional story of simple folk who become true heroes when burdened with unanticipated circumstances.

=== Casting ===
A total of more than 500 episodic artists participated in the mass scenes. Ilya Malakov, who played Evpaty Kolovrat, first starred in the main role in a feature film.

=== Filming ===
The filmmakers decided to abandon the reconstruction of historical events of the thirteenth century and chose to create a fairy-tale world with good and bad characters.

Principal photography for the film was shot in Moscow, in a specially constructed pavilion at the ZiL plant, where the largest chromakey pavilions in Europe were erected, the total area of which was more than 4,000 square meters. In the neighboring pavilions, a hall for training actors and stuntmen was equipped, as well as a riding arena and a stable.

Mongol warriors completely destroyed Ryazan, in its place is now the village of Staraya Ryazan (transl. Old Ryazan), Spassky District, Ryazan Oblast, Russia. That city, until 1778 was called Pereyaslavl Ryazan.

=== Post-production ===
The visual effects of the film studio created in the Main Road Post, which created special effects for films "The Duelist", "Prizrak", "Stalingrad". According to Pavel Stepanov, director of the Central Partnership film manufacturing company, the visual effects were deliberately fabulous to emphasize that the events of the film are produced from a legend.

== Soundtrack ==
Furious: The Movie Soundtrack

Soundtrack album by Serj Tankian
- Released: December 8, 2017
- Recorded: 2017–2018
- Genres: Film soundtrack, EDM
- Length: 1:17:31
- Languages: English, Russian
- Label: Lakeshore Records
- Director: Ivan Shurkhovestskiy

The author of the film soundtrack is American composer and musician Serj Tankian, leader of the cult band System of a Down. This was his first experience in Russian cinema.

As part of the soundtrack recording, Serj Tankian collaborated with folk instrument performers (balalaika, zhaleika, treshchotka, domra, etc.), throat singing masters from Tuva, a symphony orchestra and choir. The recordings included electric guitars and electronic instruments, but there is not a single note played on the piano in the soundtrack. Serj played personally on many instruments.

== Release ==
The Russian cinematographic agency Roskino revealed the names that he will show this year at the Cannes Film Festival in May 2017, including first looks at Central Partnership’s historical epic film Furious and war film T-34 (2019).

Furious was scheduled for release in the Russian Federation on November 30, 2017 by Central Partnership. The television premiere of the film took place on May 7, 2018 on the Russia-1 television channel.

=== Marketing ===
In November 2017, The President was shown some of the props used in the making of the film: a sword, a shield, and costume elements – all hand-made. Minister of Culture Vladimir Medinsky, film director Dzhanik Fayziev, lead actor Ilya Malakov and lead actress Polina Chernyshova also attended the screening. President Vladimir Putin, and watch Dzhanik Fayziev's historical fantasy film Furious (also known as Legend of Kolovrat) at the Moscow Kremlin.

The title song for the soundtrack, the dramatic composition "A fine morning ", was recorded by Serj Tankian with the lead singer of the IOWA band Ekaterina Ivanchikova. The music was written by Serj, and the film's screenwriters Yevgeny and Dmitry Raevsky, as well as Ekaterina IOWA, worked with him to create the words. Serj recorded the arrangement and his part at a studio in Los Angeles, and Ekaterina wrote her vocals in Saint Petersburg. (Serj Tankian & IOWA on YouTube)

Well Go USA acquired North American rights to the Russian historical action epic Furious, which is being sold in Berlin by Central Partnership, French-speaking countries (Acteurs Auteurs Associes) and Spain (Mediaset).

In April 2018, TGV Cinemas was licensed to screen the movie in its Malaysian cinemas.

== Reception ==
The film was made with a budget of 360 million rubles and was very successful at the box office, earning 30 million rubles on its opening day and 261 million its first weekend. The film's total revenue is estimated at 606 million rubles.

== See also ==
- Viking (film), a 2016 Russian pseudo-historical film
