= Pavel Tabakov (actor) =

Russian actor

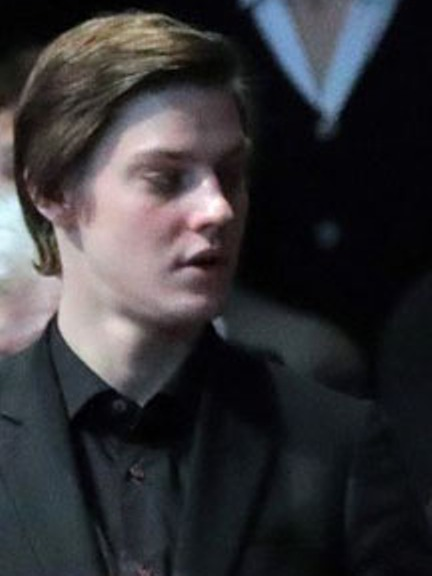
- Born: 1 August 1995 (age 30); Moscow, Russia
- Citizenship: Russia
- Occupation: actor
- Years active: 2008–present
- Employer(s): Moscow Art Theatre (2015–present); Moscow Theatre of Oleg Tabakov (2015–2018)

Pavel Olegovich Tabakov (born 1 August 1995, Moscow, Russia) is a Russian theatre and film actor. He is the son of Oleg Tabakov and Marina Zudina.

== Biography ==
Pavel Tabakov was born on 1 August 1995 in a family of actors, Oleg Tabakov (1935–2018) and Marina Zudina (born 1965). He has a younger sister, Maria (born 2006), an older half-brother from his father, Anton Tabakov (born 1960), a restaurateur, and a half-sister, Alexandra (born 1966).

He made his stage debut at the age of 12 in 2008, playing Vincent in the play The Moon Monster at the Moscow Art Theatre. In his childhood, Pavel was more interested in entrepreneurship than acting. After completing 9th grade, he informed his parents that he planned to enroll in his father's theatre school.

In 2011, he entered the Oleg Tabakov Theatre School. During his studies, he lived in a dormitory for students.

After graduation in 2015, he joined the Moscow Theatre of Oleg Tabakov troupe and the Moscow Art Theatre troupe.

He made his film debut in 2014 in the drama Star, playing a 15-year-old schoolboy. Since then, he has appeared in multiple films and TV series. He is widely known for playing Pavel I in the historical television series Ekaterina. Rise.

Since 2017, he has been studying part-time at the producing department of GITIS.

In September 2018, he resigned from the Moscow Art Theatre under the new artistic director Vladimir Mashkov. He then focused on his film career. In 2020, following the reorganization of the Moscow Art Theatre and the closure of the trainees’ group, he became part of the main troupe.

== Theatre work ==
=== Stage roles ===
Moscow Art Theatre:

- Zvezda vashogo perioda — Misha Myshkin
- Northern Wind — Hugo
- The Moon Monster — Vincent
- Musketeers. Saga. Part One — Buckingham
- Dragon — Heinrich

Moscow Theatre of Oleg Tabakov:

- The Year I Was Not Born — Prov Sudakov
- Viy — Rhetor Tiberiy Gorobets
- Biloxi Blues — Private Eugene M. Jerome
- Nameless Star — Marin Miroy, astronomy teacher
- Matrosskaya Tishina — David Schwartz

Contemporary Theatre:

- Forever Alive. History in Faces — Oleg Tabakov

== Filmography ==
- Star (2014)
- Orlean (2015)
- Happiness Is... (2015)
- Duelist (2016)
- Mutiny (TV series, 2016)
- Ekaterina. Rise (TV series, 2017)
- How I Became... (2018)
- Dead Lake (TV series, 2018)
- Diplomat (TV series, 2018)
- Tobol (2018)
- Holiday (2019)
- Ekaterina. Pretenders (TV series, 2019)
- Call-center (TV series, 2020)
- Sententia (2020)
- It’s a Match! (2020)
- Unprincipled (TV series, 2020)
- Mutiny (TV series, 2020)
- Beware of Dog (2020)
- This Is How It Works (2020)
- Flight (TV series, 2021)
- Gift (TV series, 2021)
- From Zero (TV series, 2021)
- The Pack (TV series, 2022)
- Young Man (2022)
- Night Mode (2022)
- From Zero (TV series, 2022)
- Ekaterina. Favorites (TV series, 2023)
- Empire V (2023)
- August (2025)
