= Kirill Grebenshchikov =

Russian actor

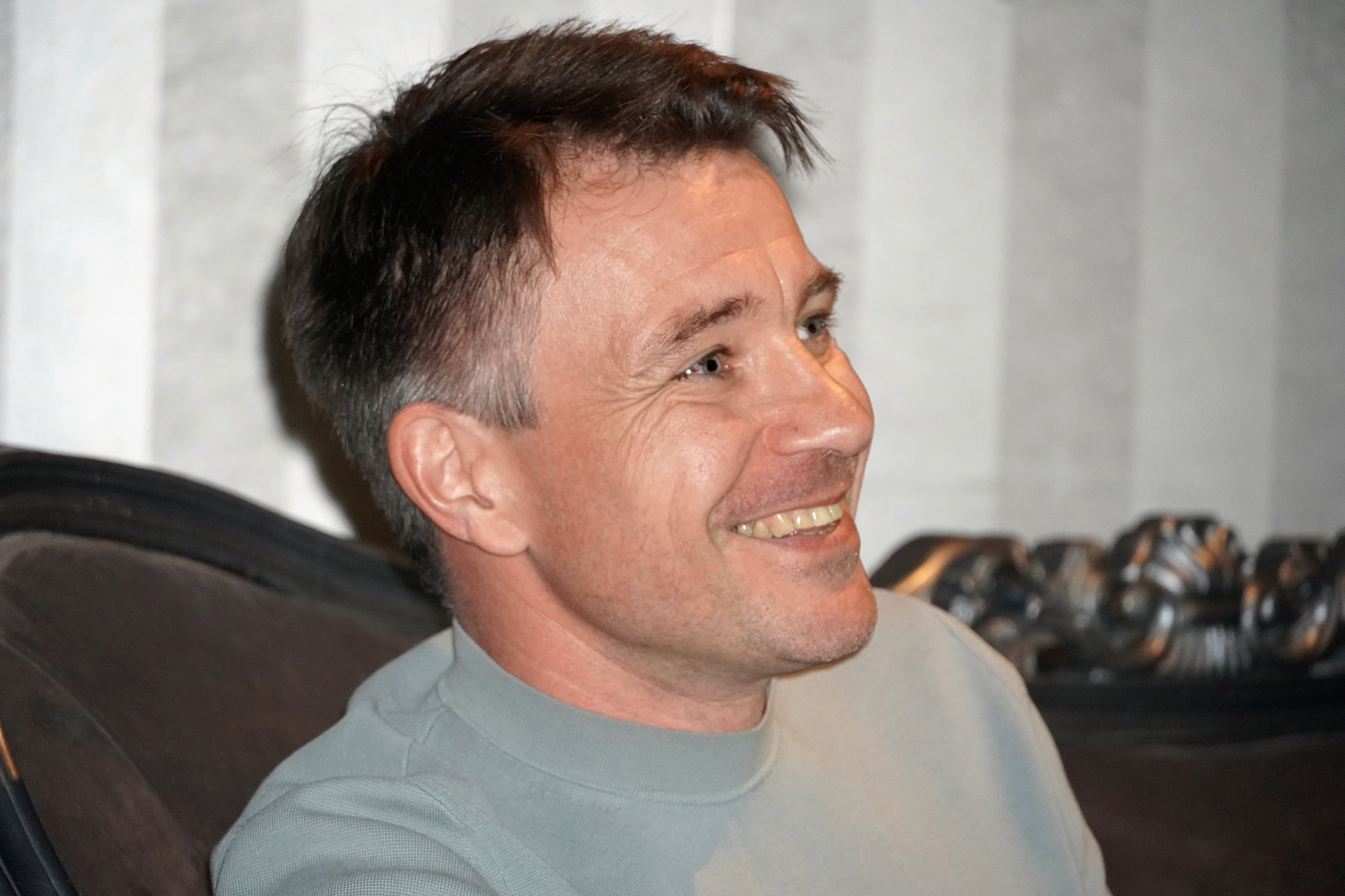
- Born: Kirill Yurievich Grebenshchikov; June 22, 1972 (age 53); Moscow, RSFSR, USSR
- Occupation: Actor
- Years active: 1992 – present

Kirill Yurievich Grebenshchikov (Russian: Кири́лл Ю́рьевич Гребенщико́в; born June 22, 1972, Moscow) is a Russian film and theater actor.

== Biography ==
Kirill Grebenshchikov was born June 22, 1972, in a family of actors. In 1989, he entered the Producer's Department at Moscow Art Theater School, where two years unlearn. In 1991, he enrolled in the acting department. After graduation he worked for two years at the Stanislavski Theatre. A short time at the end of 1997 he worked in the Moscow Youth Theatre.

In 1998-1999, he conducted on the channel Russia-K children's program Wonder Tale. In 1997, he enrolled in an acting troupe of the Anatoly Vasiliev's theater. Where he works to this day.

The first experience in the cinema took place in 1992.

== Selected filmography ==
- 1992 — Russian Romance (episode)
- 1994 — At Daggers Drawn (episode)
- 1999 — The Barber of Siberia as junker
- 2004 — Place in the Sun as Kuzmenko
- 2006 — The Brothers Karamazov as Jesus
- 2010 — House of Babies as Lev
- 2014 — Pregnancy Test as Andrey Pavlovich Lazarev
- 2017 — Anna Karenina: Vronsky's Story as Sergey Karenin
- 2022 — Desperate Shareholders as Nikolay
