= Anna Karenina: Vronsky's Story =

2017 Russian drama film

- Theatrical release poster
- Directed by: Karen Shakhnazarov
- Written by: Aleksey Buzin; Karen Shakhnazarov
- Based on: Anna Karenina; 1878 novel by Leo Tolstoy
- Produced by: Anton Zlatopolskiy (ru); Karen Shakhnazarov; Galina Shadur
- Starring: Elizaveta Boyarskaya; Maksim Matveyev; Kirill Grebenshchikov; Vitali Kishchenko
- Cinematography: Aleksandr Kuznetsov
- Edited by: Irina Kozhemyakina
- Music by: Yuri Poteyenko
- Production companies: Mosfilm Studios; VGTRK
- Distributed by: Central Partnership
- Release date: June 2017
- Running time: 138 minutes (film version); 360 minutes (director's version)
- Country: Russia
- Language: Russian

Anna Karenina: Vronsky's Story (Russian: Анна Каренина. История Вронского, romanized: Anna Karenina. Istoriya Vronskogo) is a 2017 Russian drama film directed by Karen Shakhnazarov. An expanded eight-part version titled Anna Karenina aired on the Russia-1 television channel.

It is a free adaptation of Leo Tolstoy's 1878 novel of the same name which also combines the publicistic story "During the Japanese War" and the literary cycle "Stories about the Japanese War" by Vikenty Veresaev.

== Plot ==
The film unfolds along two interconnected storylines; the events take place in the second half of the 19th century in the Russian Empire (1872–1875) and in the early 20th century during the Russo-Japanese War in China (1904). It begins thirty years after the tragic death of Anna Karenina, on the battlefields of the Russo-Japanese War — a setting not described in Tolstoy's novel.

The main narrative is set in 1904. Heavy fighting rages in Manchuria. A field hospital is shown being evacuated in the midst of a hasty Russian retreat. Amid the chaos, the chief doctor and the hospital superintendent go missing; a young doctor, Sergey Alexeyevich Karenin, is the only man qualified to replace them both. In a semi-abandoned Chinese village where the hospital has been relocated after the retreat, Karenin completes a risky operation to save the life of a wounded colonel - Count Alexey Kirillovich Vronsky.

That night, Sergey visits Vronsky’s ward and asks him to explain why his mother Anna — whom the count had known thirty years earlier — threw herself under a train, and whether anything could have changed the course of that fateful day. Although the aged Vronsky cautions Sergey that every person has their own truth, he agrees to recount the story of his and Anna's love, and in the process confronts his own lingering guilt over her disgrace and death.

== Cast ==
- Elizaveta Boyarskaya as Anna Karenina
- Maksim Matveyev as Vronsky
- Kirill Grebenshchikov as Sergey Karenin
- Vitali Kishchenko as Karenin
- Vladimir Ilyin as General
- Dmitry Miller as Aleksandr, Vronsky's brother
- Tatyana Lyutaeva as Countess Vronskaya
- Viktoriya Isakova as Dolly
- Evdokiya Germanova as Countess Kartasova
- Ivan Kolesnikov as Stepan Arkadievich Oblonsky
- Anastasiya Makeyeva as Betsi Tverskaya

== Reception ==
The majority of viewers reacted negatively to the film. Anna Karenina: Vronsky's Story has an approval rating of 20% on review aggregator website Rotten Tomatoes, based on 5 reviews, and an average rating of 4/10
