= Aleksandr Aleksandrovich Ilyin =

Russian actor (born 1983)

Aleksandr Ilyin Jr.
- Александр Ильин мл.
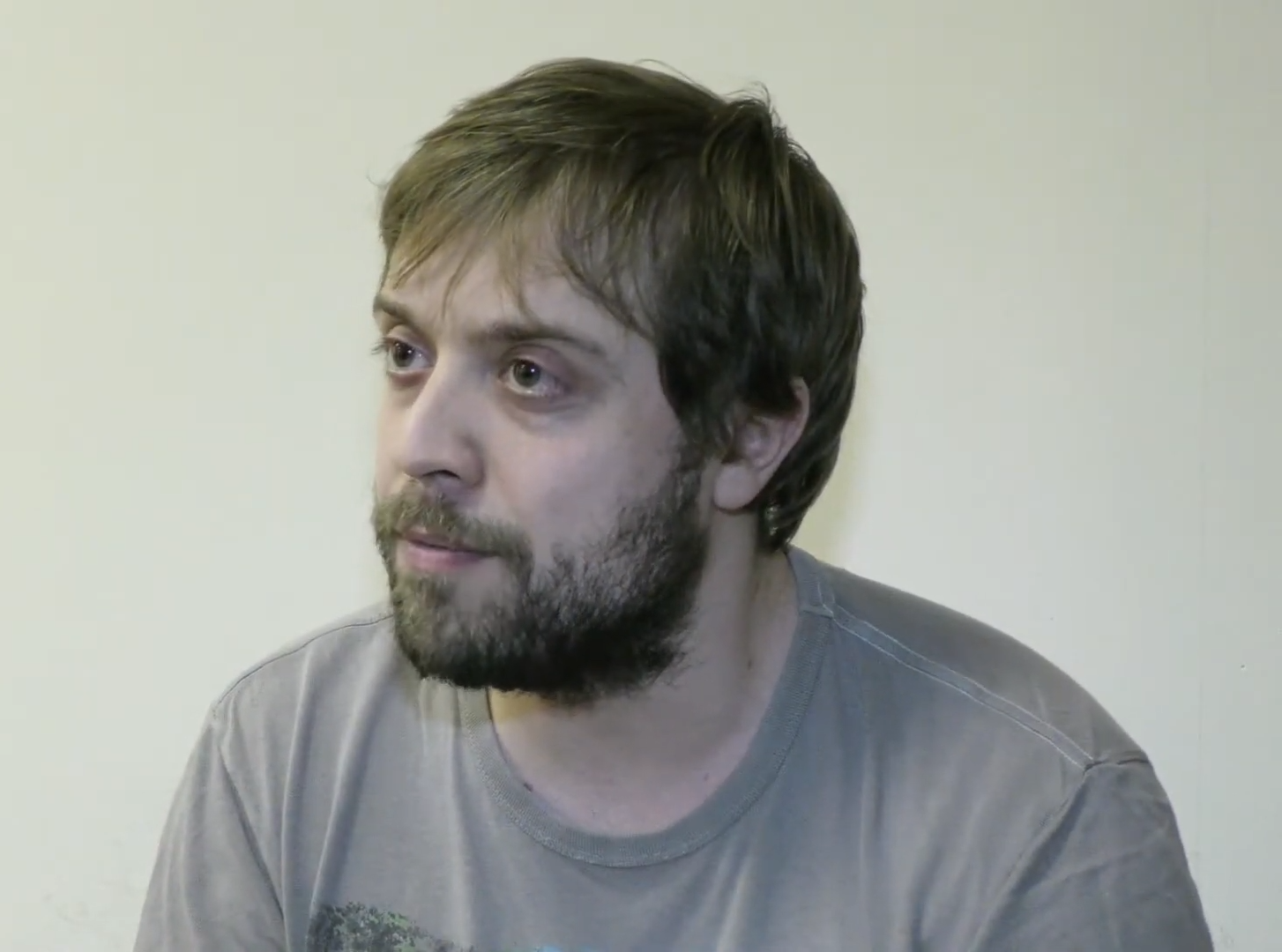
- Aleksandr Ilyin Jr.
- Born: Aleksandr Aleksandrovich Ilyin; November 22, 1983 (age 42); Moscow, RSFSR, USSR
- Occupations: Actor, singer, poet
- Years active: 1992–present

Aleksandr Aleksandrovich Ilyin Jr. (Russian: Алекса́ндр Алекса́ндрович Ильи́н мл., born November 22, 1983) is a Russian theater and film actor, poet, singer and songwriter of the punk band "Plan of Lomonosov".

== Biography ==
Aleksandr Ilyin Jr. was born in Moscow, Russian SFSR, Soviet Union (now Russia). Since 2010, he is a singer and songwriter of the punk band "Plan of Lomonosov".

== Family ==
- Father — Aleksandr Adolfovich Ilyin (born 8 May 1952), actor
- Uncle — Vladimir Adolfovich Ilyin (born 16 November 1947), actor
- Grandfather — Adolf Alekseevich Ilyin (9 April 1923 — 19 July 1990), actor and soldier in the Great Patriotic War
- Brothers — Ilya Ilyin (born 26 February 1971) and Alexey Ilyin (born 28 September 1980), actors

== Personal life ==
He comes from a family of actors that include his father Aleksandr A. Ilyin, his uncle Vladimir Ilyin, and his grandfather Adolf Ilyin.

== Filmography ==
Year	Title	Role	Notes
1992-97	Melochi zhizni	boy-messenger	TV series
1997	Schizophrenia	Psychologist son Sasha - "San Sanych"	
1999	D.D.D. Dossier detective Dubrovsky	a boy in a museum in Chita	
2005	The Case of "Dead Souls"	Judge Ammos Fedorovich Lyapkin-Tyapkin	TV series
2006	Playing the Victim	policeman Seva	
2008	Wild Field	Petro	
2009	Tsar	Fedka Basmanov	
2009	Short Circuit	sailor	
2010-15	Interns	Semyon Lobanov	TV series
2017	The Age of Pioneers	Vladimir Markelov (Helicopter Pilot)	
2017	Furious	Karkun	
2018	Coach	mechanic	
2021	Petrov's Flu	Viktor Mikhailovich	
