= The Duelist (2016 film) =

- Theatrical release poster
- Directed by: Aleksey Mizgirev
- Screenplay by: Aleksey Mizgirev
- Based on: Original script by Aleksey Mizgirev
- Produced by: Alexander Rodnyansky; Sergei Melkumov
- Starring: Pyotr Fyodorov; Vladimir Mashkov; Yulia Khlynina; Pavel Tabakov; Sergei Garmash; Yuri Kolokolnikov; Martin Wuttke; Franziska Petri
- Cinematography: Maksim Osadchy
- Edited by: Igor Litoninskiy
- Music by: Igor Vdovin
- Production companies: Columbia Pictures; Non-Stop Production
- Distributed by: Walt Disney Studios Sony Pictures Releasing (WDSSPR)
- Release dates: September 9, 2016 (TIFF); September 29, 2016 (Russia)
- Running time: 110 minutes
- Country: Russia
- Language: Russian
- Budget: US$11.4 million
- Box office: US$6.01 million

The Duelist (Russian: Дуэлянт, romanized: Duelyant) is a 2016 Russian action adventure thriller drama film directed by Aleksey Mizgirev. The film stars Pyotr Fyodorov, Vladimir Mashkov, and Yulia Khlynina. This is the third Russian feature film produced using the IMAX format. It was released in Russia on September 29, 2016, in full IMAX.

An adventure film, with dramatic and thriller elements set against the backdrop of palaces and the noble view of the Russian capital, the movie centers on Yakovlev, a retired officer, who returns to St. Petersburg from a long exile. While in the city, he fights as a duelist's representative. During Nineteenth-century Russian duel law allowed for a duelist to be replaced by any one person. Though Yakovlev fights for money, he also seeks honor and revenge against those who disgraced him, therein, challenging the Russian Providence.

== Inspirations ==
The movie goes back to the novels of City mysteries, popular in the middle of the 19th century (the most famous example - Les Vrais Mystères de Paris (1844) by Eugène François Vidocq). In preparation for filming, Alex Mizgirev reviewed the movie The Duellists directed by Ridley Scott (1977) and loosely based on the novel by Joseph Conrad's Duel, which, in turn, was inspired by Alexander Pushkin's The Shot.

== Plot ==
Set in Saint Petersburg in 1860, the story revolves around retired officer Yakovlev. A deadly shot, Yakovlev is effectively a kind of mercenary in that he is available for hire through his associate Baron Staroe to stand in for others in formal duels.

Much later in the film, flashbacks reveal that years ago an Aleut shaman has predicted he would never die, and so far that seems about right as Yakovlev wins duel after duel, wounding and more often killing noble opponents. Although duels of honor are technically illegal in Russia at the time, most people turn a blind eye to the law. The code of practice is not written down anywhere, and yet everyone knows the rules and rituals, while many participants see it as an almost mystical rite. To take part in a duel is to accept that one's fate is ultimately in the hands of God, hence the practice of Russian roulette.

Eventually, it turns out that all of Yakovlev's recent duels were secretly arranged by Count Beklemishev. He is a shadowy puppet master with a grudge and designs on Princess Martha Tuchkova whose brother (Prince Tuchkov) Yakovlev is scheduled to duel with next. When attraction stirs between him and the pretty blond princess, problems arise, especially since, as the flashbacks reveal, Yakovlev has an agenda of his own.

== Cast ==
- Pyotr Fyodorov as Yakovlev/Kolyshev
  - Aleksandr Yatsenko as Yakovlev Jr.
- Vladimir Mashkov as Graf Beklemishev
- Yulia Khlynina as Martha Tuchkova
- Pavel Tabakov as Prince Tuchkov
- Franziska Petri as grand duchess Alexandra
- Sergei Garmash as Vasily Semyonov, one-handed
- Yuri Kolokolnikov as Prince Basargin
- Yury Kuznetsov as Kolychev family servant
- Dmitriy Kulichkov as captain Chichagov
- Pavel Kuzmin as captain Liprandi
- Dmitriy Lysenkov as senate official
- Anatoly Kondyubov as Arndt doctor
- Anton Kuznetsov as merchant-gunsmith
- Dmitry Zhuravlyov as lieutenant colonel
- Nikita Kukushkin as young non-commissioned officer
- Aleksandr Aravushkin as commandant of the fortress
- Pierre Bourel as Prince Rayn
- Sergey Godin as second of Basargin
- Igor Khripunov as second of Prince Rein
- Sergey Trebesov as escort soldier
- Aleksandr Mizev as officer jailer
- Aleksandra Serebryakova as noblewoman
- Martin Wuttke as German baron

== Release ==
The screening was part of the 2016 Toronto International Film Festival official program.

The film was released in Russia on September 29, 2016, by Walt Disney Studios Sony Pictures Releasing (WDSSPR). It was scheduled for release in China in 2017.

== Reception ==
=== Box office ===
The film was number-one on its opening weekend at the Russian box office, with US$2.4 million.

=== Critical response ===
Anton Dolin noted the uniqueness of the genre of "the most intriguing of the Russian film of the year", where Saint Petersburg is represented as "city of permanent flooding", rain-drenched and mud; in this respect it resembles the works of steampunk London. According to Dolin, it is extremely rare in post-Soviet Russia the sample quality mainstream and the first ever Russian blockbuster, has earned a solid "five": at an altitude here and casting, and "brutal-rock" music, and "noble-monochrome" movie.

According to conclusion written by Andrey Plakhov: "Mizgiryov with his usual taste for brutalism produces big-budget costume author noir genre and esthetic at the same time: Petersburg is buried in dirt, the Grand Duchess sleeps with cynical mercenary and Russian nobles, who boast of a code of honor, behave if it 'brother "dashing nineties", or thugs, adventurers in the Wild West". His colleague Michael Trofimenkov saw this as a conscious debunking the myth of the beautiful and noble 'Russia which we have lost': "High Society - a flock of black brutal killers, wearing a fetish noble honor, the concept of which has already become for them a "concept". The ruling class, professing the cult of blood, sexually worshiper arms and engaged in pointless self-destruction in the duels, the right word, is not worthy of reverence to him. Around this class more trouble-free and curl performers dirty orders, intermediaries, pimps. But perhaps the nastier they titled young man with big names and a slim profile, ready to sink your best friend a knife in the back".

Western Professional reviews of the film were very few. Based on 14 reviews collected by Rotten Tomatoes, The Duelist has an overall approval rating from critics of 43% based on 14 reviews, with an average score of 5.50/10. On Metacritic, the film has a weighted average score of 55 out of 100, based on 10 critics, indicating "mixed or average reviews". The Hollywood Reporter's Leslie Felperin found the film as appropriate to compare to the "universal for any country story about social mobility issues, honor and militarism" with classic westerns, though lamented the technical imperfections ("in IMAX some of the frames darker look videotaped"). The Variety reviewer Dennis Harvey gave a moderately negative review, rated the film as "Putin's fantasy of the Russian Empire" and noting the absurdity of individual scenes and episodes.

== See also ==
- Cinema of Russia
