= Polina Chernyshova =

Russian theater and film actress

- Полина Чернышова
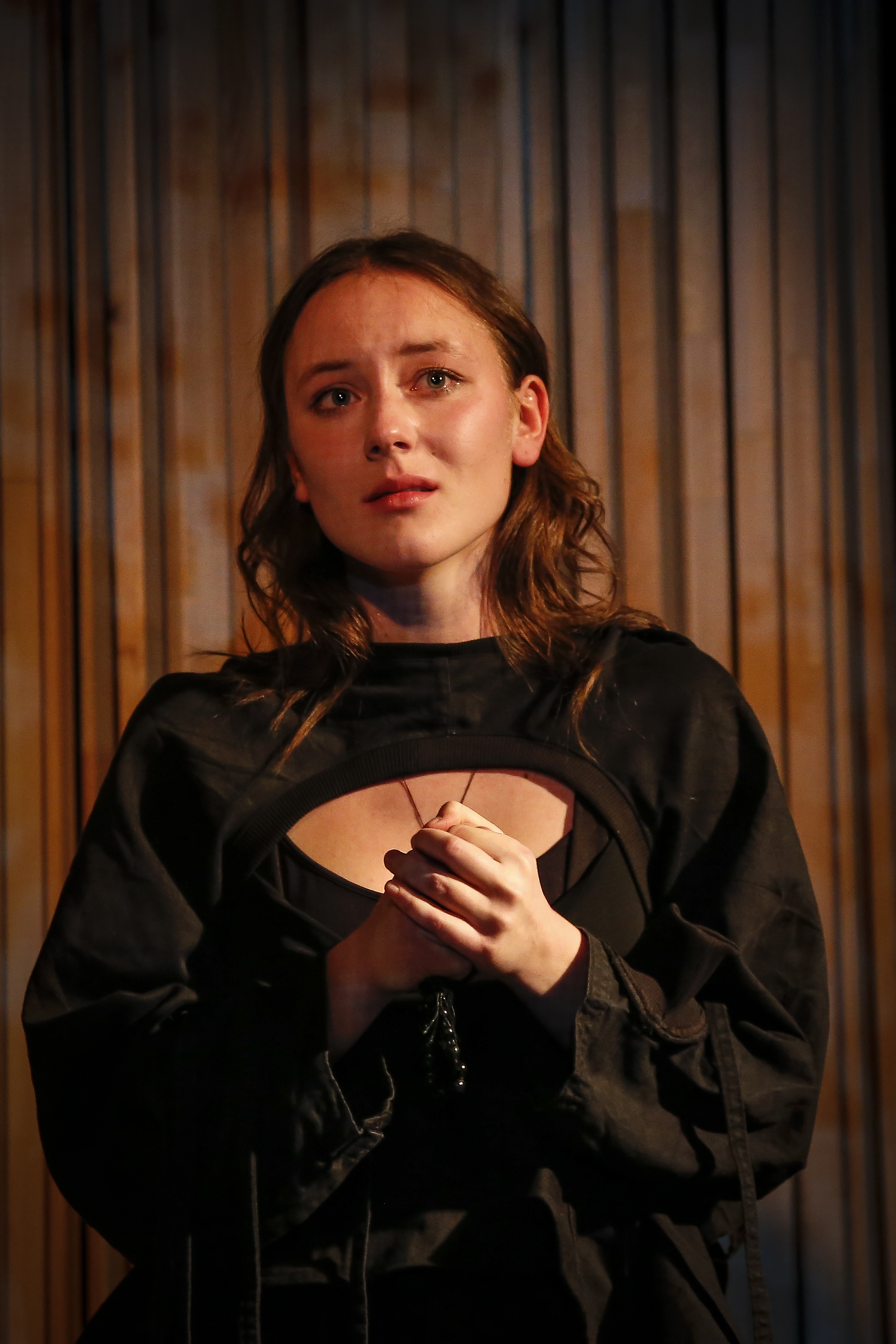
- Chernyshova at the play-collage on the works of Shakespeare in the theater in 2015
- Born: Polina Ilinichna Chernyshova; 11 October 1993 (age 32); Moscow, Russia
- Occupation: Actress
- Years active: 2015–present

Polina Ilinichna Chernyshova (Russian: Полина Ильинична Чернышова; born 11 October 1993) is a Russian theater and film actress. She is best known for her role in the film Furious (2017).

== Early life ==
Polina Chernyshova was born in Moscow, Russia and is the daughter of photo artist Ilya Chernyshov. Since childhood, she studied choreography, modern dance, and singing.

In 2014, she graduated from the Boris Shchukin Theatre Institute, course of V. Ivanov.

In 2015, she was admitted to the First Studio of the Vakhtangov Theater. Her debut on the Vakhtangov stage had taken place a year earlier. Polina played stats-lady in the children's play "Cat in Boots", staged by her teacher, Professor Vladimir Ivanov.

== Career ==
Wide popularity came to her in 2015 after the role of Aksinya in the television movie of Sergey Ursulyak Quiet Flows the Don. As Polina said, she was preparing for the filming of Quiet Flows the Don for six months and tried to think through all the details to the smallest detail.

Critics have rated her work differently, there have been many comparisons with Elina Bystritskaya - the performer of the role of Aksinya in the Quiet Flows the Don by Sergey Gerasimov. But in general, the actress coped with a difficult role - she created her own image of Aksinya Astakhova.

In 2017, the historical film Furious was released, in which Polina played one of the main roles.

== Awards ==
- Prize for the best female role for the role of Elena in the performance "A Midsummer Night's Dream" at the 9th International Theater Competition at the Gerasimov Institute of Cinematography in 2013.
- The Theater Prize "Golden Leaf" for the role of Varvara Kharitonovna in the play "Late Love" (season 2013-2014).

== Filmography ==
Year	Title	Role	Notes
2015	Quiet Flows the Don (ru)	Aksinya Astakhova	TV series
2017	Furious	Nastya	
2017	Doctor Richter	Olga Khodasevich, physician-immunologist	TV series
2018	Sea-buckthorn summer	Olga, wife of Vampilov	
2019	Dyatlov Pass	student	
2020	White Snow	Nina Gavrylyuk	
2020	The Red Ghost	Vera, Military Doctor	
2025	Evil City	Darya	
2026	Litvyak	Lidiya Litvyak	
