= Dzhanik Fayziev =

Soviet and Russian film director

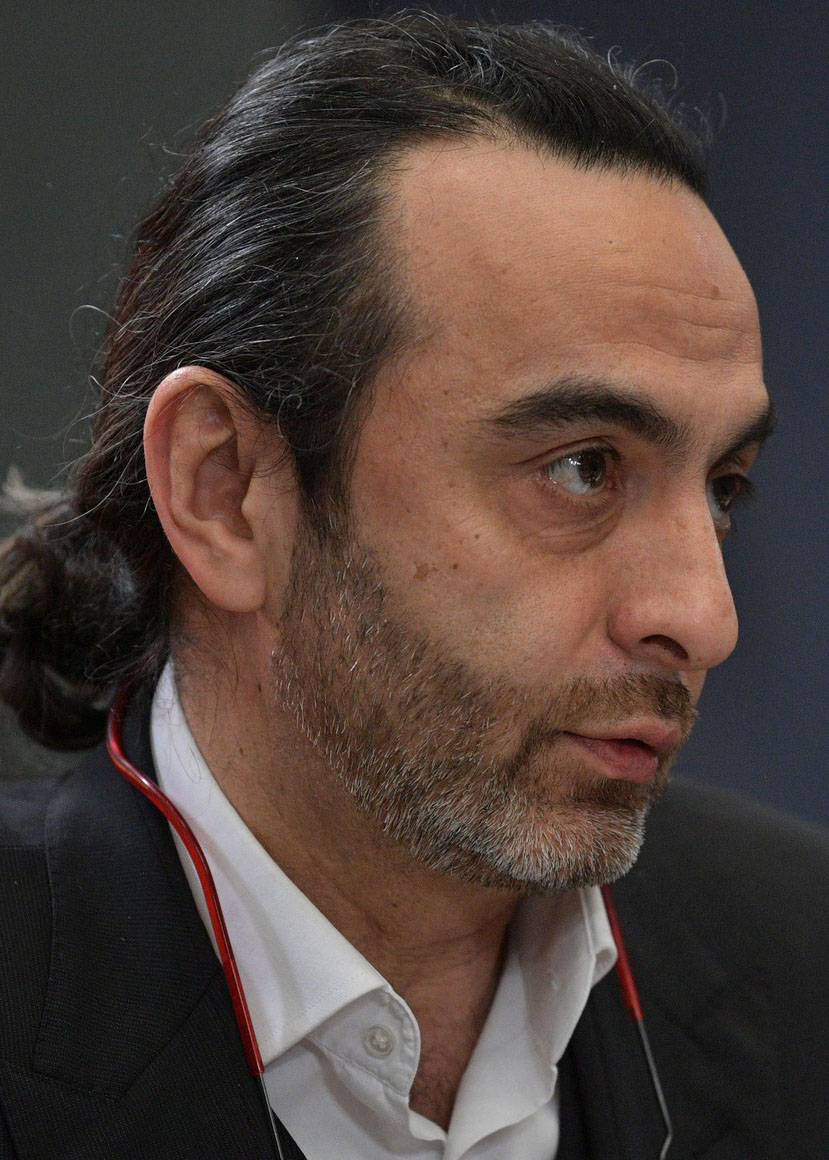
- Born: Jahоngir Habibullaevich Fayziev; July 30, 1961 (age 65); Tashkent, Soviet Union (now Uzbekistan)
- Citizenship: Uzbekistan; Russian Federation
- Occupations: film director, film producer, screenwriter

Dzhanik Habibullaevich Fayziev (Russian: Джаник Хабибуллаевич Файзиев, born July 30, 1961) is an Uzbek and Russian director, producer and screenwriter. He specializes in historical adventure movies. Most notably, he directed The Turkish Gambit and Legend of Kolovrat, and produced Admiral.

== Filmography ==
As director

- Old Songs of the Main Things 2 (1997)
- Namedni 1961-2003: Nasha Era (1997)
- Russian Еmpire (2000)
- Request Stop (2000)
- The Turkish Gambit (2005)
- August Eighth (2012)
- Furious (2017)
- Goalkeeper of the Galaxy (2020)
- Deni i Meni v kino! (2026)

As producer

- Old Songs of the Main Things 2 (1997)
- Ice Age (2002)
- Russians in the City of Angels (2013)
- Admiral (2008)
- Desantura (2009)
- High Security Vacation (2009)
- Love Undercover (2010)
- August Eighth (2012)
- Furious (2017)
- Rebellion (2017)
- Krepost Badaber (2018)
- Rubezh (2018)
- Mermaid: The Lake of the Dead (2018)
- Goalkeeper of the Galaxy (2020)
- Deni i Meni v kino! (2026)

As screenwriter

- Old Songs of the Main Things 2 (1997)
- August Eighth (2012)
- Goalkeeper of the Galaxy (2020)
- Deni i Meni v kino! (2026)

== Personal views ==
In March 2014, he signed an appeal of Russian cultural figures in support of President Putin's policy on Ukraine and Crimea.
