= Andrey Merzlikin =

Russian film and theater actor (born 1973)

- Андрей Мерзликин
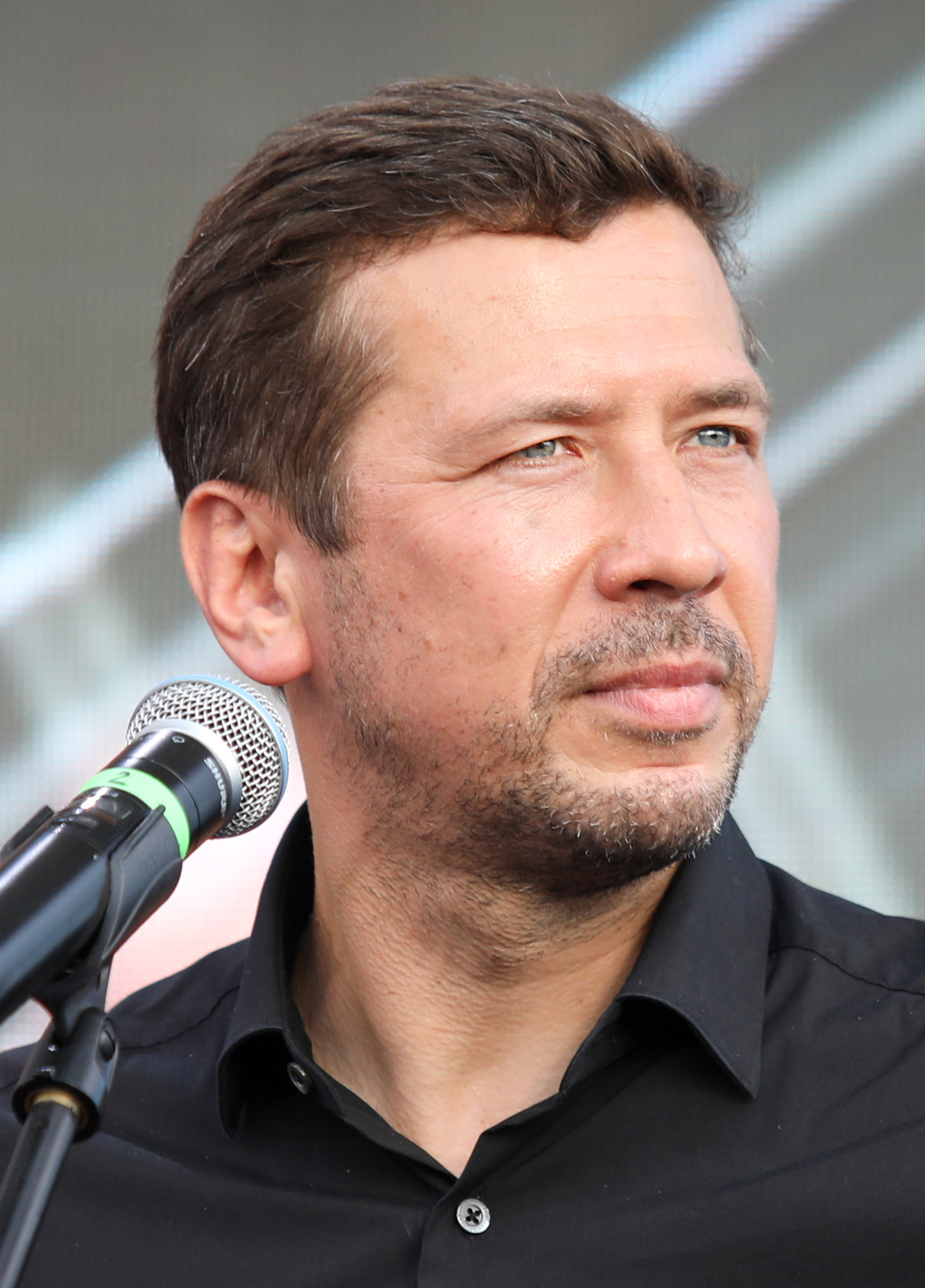
- Andrey Merzlikin in 2020
- Born: Andrey Ilyich Merzlikin; 24 March 1973 (age 53); Kaliningrad, Russian SFSR, Soviet Union
- Occupation: Actor
- Years active: 1997–present
- Spouse: Anna Osokina
- Children: 4
- Website: merzlikin.ru

Andrey Ilyich Merzlikin (Russian: Андре́й Ильи́ч Мерзли́кин; born 24 March 1973) is a Russian film and theater actor.

== Early life ==
Andrey Merzlikin was born in Kaliningrad near Moscow. In the first education – radio engineer of space engineering, then earned a degree in economics. In parallel, he graduated from the acting department Gerasimov Institute of Cinematography (workshop of Yevgeny Kindinov). While studying at the institute, he starred in the short film "How I Spent My Summer" (dir. Natalia Pogonicheva) and received the prize for best actor at the film festival VGIK.

== Personal life ==
In March 2006 Andrey married Anna Osokina – psychologist. They have three children: son Fyodor (born 2006), daughter Serafima (born 2008) and daughter Evdokiya (born 2010). Four children (born January 2016).

== Career ==
Merzlikin has appeared in over fifteen films and in several television productions.

=== Filmography ===
Year	Title	Role	Genre
2003	Bumer	Dimon 'Oshparenny'	crime
2005	Dead Man's Bluff	Referent / Mikhalych's Assistant	black comedy, crime
2006	Franz + Polina	Pavel	war drama romance
2006	Moscow Mission	Maks	action thriller
2006	Rush Hour	Yura Smirnitskiy	drama
2007	May	Aleksander Gaevskiy	
2007	Russian game	Krugel	
2008	Swing	Captain Sergey Makarov	
2008	Plus One	Markov	
2008	The Inhabited Island	Fank	science fiction
2009	Strayed	Man	Thriller
2009	Newsmakers	Smirnov	Action
2009	Russia 88	functionary	Mockumentary
2009	The Invisibles	Klebeyev	science fiction
2009	O Lucky Man!	Sanya-Frigate	comedy
2010	The Brest Fortress	Andrey Kizhevatov	war movie
2010	Burnt by the Sun 2	Nikolai, tanker	war movie
2010	Hydraulics	Sam	
2011	4 Days in May	Gray, the scout	
2012	Spy	Karpenko	Action
2013	Sherlock Holmes	Halifax	TV series
2013	Pyotr Leschenko. Everything That Was...	Georgiy Khrapak	TV series
2014	Molodezhka	Maxim Streltsov	TV Series
2015	Paws, Bones & Rock'n'roll	Lyokha	
2015	Green Carriage	Vadim Rayevsky	
2017	The Road to Calvary	Arkady Zhadov	TV Series
2018	Tanks	Mikhail Koshkin	
2018	A Rough Draft	Felix	
2018	Godunov	Vasily Shuisky	TV series
2022	Night Mode	teacher	
2023	The Librarian	Maxim Vyazintsev	TV Series
2023	Solntse na vkus	Father	
2026	Angels of War	Major	

== Political activities ==
Merzlikin supported the pro-Russian separatist movement during the war in Donbas, referring to secessionist fighters as "heroes." In May 2015 Merzlikin visited the separatist-controlled Donetsk People's Republic, where he and other Russian actors presented film "The Brest Fortress".

The actor publicly voiced his support for Russia's full scale invasion of Ukraine in 2022. He subsequently campaigned for Vladimir Putin during the 2024 Russian presidential election
