= Bezrukov =

Bezrukov (Russian: Безру́ков, masculine) or Bezrukova (Russian: Безру́кова; feminine) is a common Russian surname, derived from the word "безрукий" (literally mean "armless").

People with this surname include:

- Anastasia Bezrukova (born 2004), Russian model and actress
- Donald Heathfield (real name: Andrey Bezrukov, born 1960), Soviet spy
- Lyudmila Bezrukova (born 1945), Soviet sprint canoer
- Sergey Bezrukov (biophysicist), Russian biophysicist
- Sergey Bezrukov (born 1973), Russian actor and son of Vitali Bezrukov
- Vitali Bezrukov (born 1942), Russian actor and theatre director
