= Yuliya Rutberg =

Soviet and Russian actress

- Юлия Рутберг
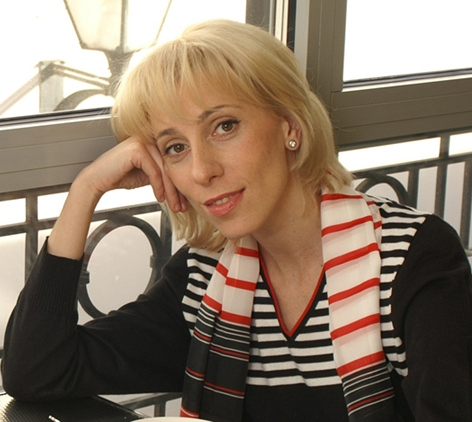
- Rutberg in 2005
- Born: July 8, 1965 (age 60); Moscow, USSR
- Occupation: Actress
- Awards: People's Artist of the Russian Federation; 2016

Yuliya Ilinichna Rutberg (Russian: Ю́лия Ильи́нична Ру́тберг; born July 8, 1965) is a Soviet and Russian stage and film actress, and People's Artist of the Russian Federation (2016). She is a Laureate of the Russian theatre awards.

== Selected filmography ==
- 1989 — Two Arrows. Stone Age Detective as cave girl
- 1990 — Stalin's Funeral as Dodik's mother
- 1998 — Makarov as Alyona
- 2000 — Empire Under Attack as Lyubov Azef
- 2005–06 — Not Born Beautiful as Kristina Voropayeva
- 2012 — Anna German. Tajemnica białego anioła as Anna Akhmatova
- 2013 — One Particular Pioneer as Nadezhda Vladimirovna
- 2015 — Orlova and Alexandrov as Faina Ranevskaya
- 2021 — Bender: The Beginning as Madame Sokolovich
- 2021 — Bender: Gold of the Empire as Madame Sokolovich
- 2022 — Papy as (2022) as Inessa Andreyevna
