= Danila Poperechny =

Russian stand-up comedian, YouTuber and podcaster

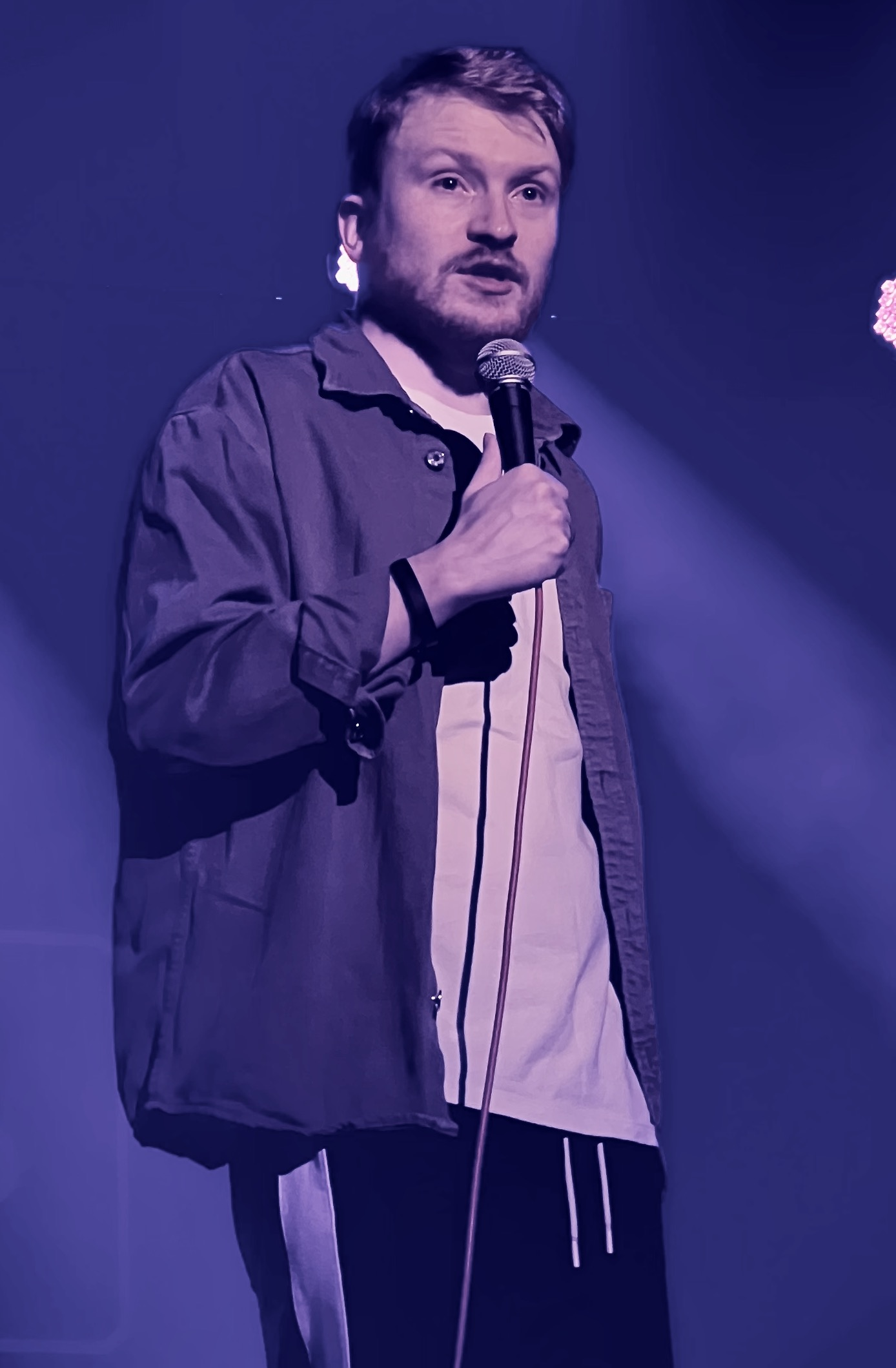
- Poperechny in 2022
- Born: Danila Alexeyevich Poperechny; 10 March 1994 (age 32); Voronezh, Russia
- Occupations: Animator; Comedian; YouTuber; Actor; Screenwriter

YouTube information
- Channel: Данила Поперечный
- Years active: 2010–present
- Genres: Animation; Stand-up comedy; Podcast; Vlog; Music videos
- Subscribers: 3.43 million
- Views: 580 million
- Last updated: 2 Sept, 2024
- Website: www.poperechnytour.ru

Danila Alexeyevich Poperechny (Russian: Данила Алексеевич Поперечный, born March 10, 1994) is a Russian stand-up comedian, YouTuber, actor and podcaster.

== Early life ==
Poperechny was born in Voronezh, Russia. When he was in high school, his family moved to Kyiv, Ukraine, where they have lived for six years. After graduating from school, Poperechny studied computer engineering in Rzeszów, Poland, but dropped out during his second year.

== Career ==
Poperechny created his YouTube channel Spoontamer on December 11, 2009. The first videos he uploaded were self-made humorous cartoons. He also has worked for Spasibo, Eva! network as an animator, but soon left it because of its connection with the Russian government. He started his stand up career in 2013 and has filmed seven specials for his YouTube channel. Poperechny names Louis C.K., Doug Stanhope, Jim Jefferies, and Joe Rogan among his inspirers.

Poperechny is also known for his podcast Soulless (Russian: Без души, Bez dushi) where he speaks to Russian and foreign celebrities from different areas, such as Jacques Anthony, Gennady Khazanov, Irina Gorbacheva, L'One, Daniel Sloss, Garik Kharlamov, Leonid Parfenov, Yolka, Ilya Naishuller, Ilya Prusikin, Morgenshtern, Yuri Kuklachov, Eva Elfie, Jia Lissa, Ekaterina Schulmann, Mikhail Shats etc.

Poperecnhy also wrote scripts for Noize MC's music videos. As for 2021, he was cast in the leading role in Ilya Naishuller's Young Man (Russian: Молодой человек).

== Political activity ==
Poperechny is famous for his active citizenship. He stands for the LGBT rights and opposes the Russian Orthodox Church. He has also repeatedly expressed support for Alexei Navalny and criticized current Russian government, especially Vladimir Putin, Dmitry Peskov, Ramzan Kadyrov, and Vitaly Milonov. The latter even sued him for filming a satirical music video POPE culture (Russian: ПОП-культура, POP-kul'tura), in which Poperechny had parodied stereotypical Russian Orthodox priest. He is an atheist.

Two years later Poperechny published a parody on Ramzan Kadyrov. Chechen Press Minister Dzhambulat Umarov rated the video as an unprofessional performance and called Poperechny an idiotic donkey.

The Security Service of Ukraine banned Poperechny from entering Ukraine on May 15, 2018, for his anti-Ukrainian position, which caused the cancellation of his stand-up shows in Kyiv, Odesa, and Kharkiv. Later Poperechny claimed to challenge Ukrainian government in court.

In 2021, Poperechny paid a fine of $7.000 for Svetlana Prokopyeva, a journalist who had been charged with 'justifying terrorism'.

In February 2022, Poperechny opposed the Russian invasion of Ukraine. Poperechny's video in which he condemns the Russian invasion was included in the list of prohibited materials by Roskomnadzor. Following the invasion, Poperechny emigrated to Los Angeles, California.

On June 14, 2024, Russian Ministry of Justice included Poperechny in its "foreign agents" list.

== List of stand up specials ==
1. Stand Up in St Petersburg (Russian: Stand Up в Питере, Stand Up v Pitere), 2014
2. Without Swearing (Russian: Без мата, Bez mata), 2015
3. The Big Lie (Russian: Большая ложь, Bol'shaya lozh), 2015
4. The D_CK (Russian: Х_Й, H_Y), 2016
5. Where to Laugh? (Russian: Где смеяться?, Gde smeyatsya?), 2017
6. The Unflattering (Russian: Нелицеприятный, Nelitsepriyatny), 2018
7. Special fo Kids (Russian: Спешл фо Кидс, Speshl fo kids), 2020
8. The Fun Life (Russian: Весёлая Жизнь, Vesyolaya Zhizn), 2023
9. Agent 813 (Russian: Агент 813, Agent 813), 2025
