= Nikita Kologrivyy =

Russian actor (born 1994)

- Никита Кологривый
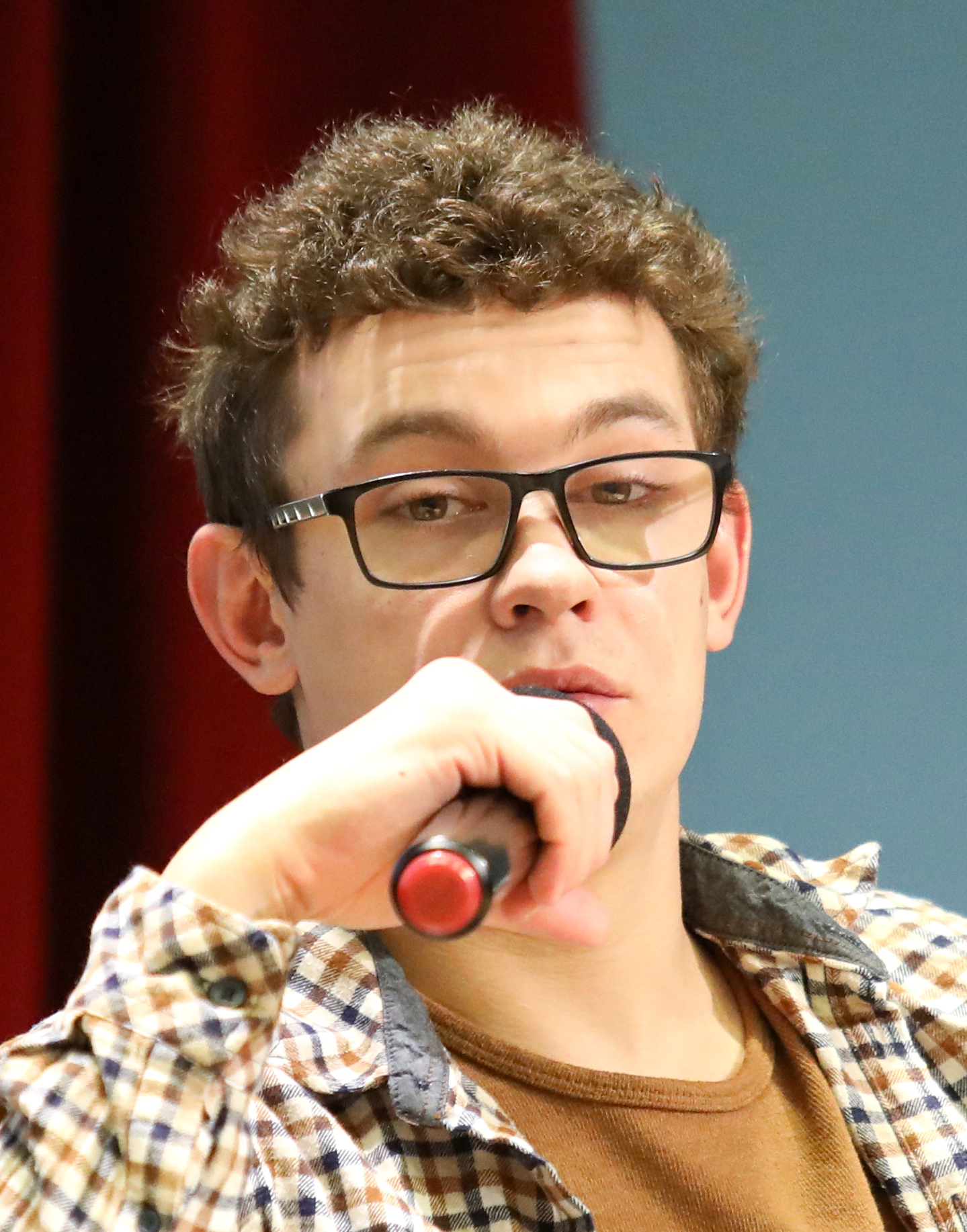
- Kologrivyy in 2024
- Born: Nikita Sergeevich Kologrivyy; October 16, 1994 (age 31); Novosibirsk, Russia
- Citizenship: Russian
- Occupation: Actor
- Years active: 2015–present

Nikita Sergeevich Kologrivyy (Russian: Никита Сергеевич Кологривый; born October 16, 1994) is a Russian actor. He is known for his roles in Igor Zaitsev’s Bender film trilogy, as Lewis in the series Offline, Gera in Two Hills, Yemelya in Wish of the Fairy Fish (2023), and Kashchey in The Boy's Word: Blood on the Asphalt.

== Early life and education ==
Kologrivyy was born in Novosibirsk. He attended school in Bila Tserkva until the 7th grade. In his youth he practiced boxing and initially planned to enroll in a pedagogical university as a coach, but instead entered the Novosibirsk State Theater Institute. After completing his second year, he moved to Moscow and enrolled at the Russian Institute of Theatre Arts (GITIS), studying under Sergey Golomazov and Pavel Khomsky. He graduated with honors in 2018.

While studying, he made his stage debut in 2015 at the Moscow Provincial Theatre in Treasure Island, produced with the support of Sergei Bezrukov.

== Career ==
Kologrivyy has worked extensively in theatre and screen productions. In 2023, he served as creative producer and lead actor of the series Max and Goose, directed by Denis Pavlov and written by Vadim Valiullin.

As of 2025, his filmography includes more than 96 film and television roles, notably Major Grom: Plague Doctor (2021), Bender: The Beginning (2021), Two Hills (2022–2023), Offline (2022–2023), and The Boy's Word: Blood on the Asphalt (2023). He is also active in voice acting.

== Personal life ==
During his studies at GITIS, Kologrivyy met actress Aleksandrina Pitirimova. They married in 2020 and had a daughter, Yesenia, born in May 2021. The couple divorced in 2023.

== Public views ==
In 2023–2024, Kologrivyy made public statements supporting Russia’s invasion of Ukraine and criticizing Russian actors who left the country. He recorded a video message addressed to Russian soldiers, expressing gratitude for their service.

In January 2024, he was added to the Ukrainian Myrotvorets database for public support of Russian aggression and for filming in annexed Crimea.

Assessing his acting abilities, Kologrivyy stated that he could now "go toe-to-toe with any actor in the country" with his roles and that he sees no "worthy competitors" for himself in the Russian film industry. In an interview in February 2023, Kologrivyy said he does not believe that Innokenty Smoktunovsky was a better actor than him, and also that he dislikes the acting of both Smoktunovsky and Aleksandr Abdulov. Leonid Yarmolnik, for his part, expressed his disagreement with Kologrivyy's stance, calling him a fool.

When asked if he fears repeating the career trajectory of Alexander Petrov, Kologrivyy replied that he is not afraid, but rather aspires to it. According to him, he is already following in the footsteps of Petrov and Danila Kozlovsky, whose demand in cinema has been high recently. At the same time, he characterized Kozlovsky as a "fake actor", suggesting that Kozlovsky's role in the film Soulless did not require any particular acting skill and could have been played by anyone. Kologrivyy also criticized Aleksandra Bortich. He noted that despite her involvement in films and TV shows, she does not have an acting education. The actor spoke about his desire to work in Hollywood, where, in his words, he would "destroy everyone".

Kologrivyy has been noticed wearing a pendant with the Kolovrat symbol (journalist Oleg Kashin drew attention to a photo of Kologrivyy wearing the pendant).

== Incidents ==
On 18–19 March 2024, while intoxicated in a bar in Novosibirsk, Kologrivyy assaulted a waitress and later attacked staff members who intervened. A local court found him guilty of petty hooliganism and sentenced him to seven days of administrative arrest. An appeal by prosecutors to increase the penalty was denied.

== Filmography ==
- Light Up! (2017) as the overseer
- The Fortress in Badaber (TV, 2018) as Okul
- The Balkan Line (2018) as Kirya
- Russkiy Reyd (2020) as the Quick
- Sherlock in Russia (TV, 2020) as the Limper
- The Last Frontier as Ufimtsev
- Phantom (TV, 2020) as Artyom
- Passengers (TV, 2020) as Evgeny
- Zoya (2020) as Vasily Klubkov
- Major Grom: Plague Doctor (2021) as the Psycho
- V2. Escape from Hell (2021) as the Pock-Marked
- Bender: The Beginning (2021) as Mishka Yaponchik
- Bender: Gold of the Empire (2021) as Mishka Yaponchik
- Vertinsky (TV, 2021) as Vatsek
- First Oscar (2022) as Budarin
- Desperate Shareholders (2022) as Den
- Infiltration (2022) as Sergey "Artist"
- Life on call (TV, 2022) as Anton
- Wish of the Fairy Fish (2023) as Emilio the Fool
- The Boy's Word: Blood on the Asphalt (TV, 2023) as Kashchei, the gang leader
- Volshebnyy uchastok (TV, 2023) as the young raven
- Kombinaciya (TV, 2024) as Alexander Shishinin
- August (2025) as Senior Lieutenant Evgeny Tomantsev
- The Method (2025) as the Beast
- The Frog Princess as Koshchey
- The Frog Princess 2 as Koshchey

== Awards ==
- 2022 – KinoReporter Award, Discovery of the Year.
- 2023 – Nominee, Moscow Art Theatre Award (Film category).
- 2024 – OK! Awards “More Than Stars”, Best Actor in a TV Series for Combination.
