= An Hour Before Dawn =

An Hour Before Dawn may refer to:

- An Hour Before Dawn (film), a 1913 silent film detective drama
- An Hour Before Dawn (TV series), a 2021 Russian detective miniseries

== See also ==
- The Hour Before the Dawn, a 1944 American drama war film
