= Yesenin (TV series) =

- Genre: Biographical
- Written by: Vladimir Valutsky; Vitali Bezrukov
- Directed by: Igor Zaitsev
- Starring: Sergey Bezrukov; Alexandr Mikhailov; Oleg Tabakov
- Composer: Ruslan Muratov
- Country of origin: Russia
- Original language: Russian
- No. of series: 1
- No. of episodes: 11

Production
- Producers: Konstantin Ernst; Anatoly Maksimov; Sergei Bezrukov (creative producer)
- Cinematography: Yuri Lyubshin
- Production company: Pro-Cinema Production

Original release
- Network: Channel One Russia

Yesenin (Russian: Есенин) is a 2005 Russian biographical eleven-episode television miniseries, directorial debut of Igor Zaitsev. It outlines the conspiracy version of the death of the Russian poet Sergei Yesenin. The series is based on the novel Yesenin. Story of a Murder by Vitali Bezrukov, and the main role was played by his son Sergey Bezrukov.

== Plot ==
The series has two parallel storylines. One takes place in the 1980s. Moscow Criminal Investigations Department investigator Lieutenant Colonel Alexander Khlystov (based on real-life investigator Eduard Khlystalov) receives by post a posthumous photograph of Sergei Yesenin. He must conduct the business according to the law, to register and file away the letter. However, the Lieutenant-Colonel does otherwise - he begins his own investigation. Khlystov finds materials related to Yesenin's life, and also searches for direct witnesses who personally knew the poet. The further the investigation comes, the more evidence in favor of Yesenin's murder by the conspiracy of the Soviet Government. Khlystov even wants to insist on exhumation, but it turns out that this is impossible: the foundation was concreted in order to affix the monument to Yesenin on his grave. And now, when there is very little to prove the murder of Yesenin, the main witness suddenly perishes. On the same day Khlystov himself is killed in a car crash. The investigation remains unfinished.

The second storyline tells about Yesenin's life from the moment of his service in the army before the funeral. The film shows the main events of the poet's life, including his military service, coming to Petrograd, becoming a poet, communicating with Russia's most important figures, traveling around the country and the world, life with Isadora Duncan and his final years. The last day of Esenin's life is shown in detail. The fate of the people with whom Sergei Alexandrovich was directly connected is told in the scene depicting the poet's funeral.

== Cast ==
- Sergey Bezrukov as Sergei Yesenin
- Alexandr Mikhailov as Lieutenant Colonel Alexander Khlystov of the Moscow Criminal Investigations Department
- Oleg Tabakov as General Alexei Simagin of the KGB
- Dmitry Scherbina as Anatoly Marienhof
- Aleksandr Robak as Ivan Pribludny
- Pavel Derevyanko as Alexei Ganin
- Sean Young as Isadora Duncan
- Gary Busey as Paris Singer
- Christina Popandopulo as Lola Kinel, interpreter
- Yulia Peresild as Katerina Yesenina, Sergei's sister
- Denis Nikiforov as Sandro Kusikov
- Maxim Lagashkin as Aleksei Kruchenykh
- Kseniya Rappoport as Galina Benislavskaya, Yesenin's secretary
- Marina Zudina as Zinaida Reich
- Aleksey Shevchenkov as Alexander Tarasov-Rodionov
- Yevgeny Koryakovsky as Boris Pasternak
- Andrey Rudensky as Alexander Blok
- Anna Snatkina as Grand Duchess Tatiana
- Alexey Grishin as Osip Mandelstam
- Irina Bezrukova as Lydia Kashina
- Avangard Leontiev as Anatoly Lunacharsky
- Gosha Kutsenko as Yakov Blumkin
- Konstantin Khabensky as Leon Trotsky
- Alexander Mezentsev as Felix Dzerzhinsky
- Alexander Mokhov as Mikhail Frunze
- Andrey Krasko as Joseph Stalin
- Oleg Komarov as Grigory Zinoviev
- Roman Madyanov as Sergey Kirov
- Maria Golubkina as Sophia Tolstaya
- Tatyana Lutaeva as Olga Dieterichs-Tolstaya
- Yekaterina Guseva as Augusta Miklashevskaya
- Ekaterina Untilova as Empress Alexandra Fedorovna
- Evgeny Dyatlov as Vladimir Mayakovsky
- Peter Merkuriev as Vsevolod Meyerhold
- Oleg Lopukhov as Vasily Nasedkin
- Vladimir Goryansky as Nikolai Klyuev
- Daniil Spivakovsky as A. Vetlugin
- Andrey Leonov as Alexander Sakharov
- Olga Krasko as Lena, employee of the archive
- Nikolay Olyalin as Samokhin, former GPU officer
- Yuri Sherstnev as Mikhalych, pathologist
- Valentina Telichkina as Tatyana Fyodorovna, Yesenin's mother
- Vitali Bezrukov as Alexander Nikitich, Yesenin's father
- Irina Apeksimova as Anna Berzin
- Alexander Tyutin as Simagin
- Anatoly Gushchin as Ilya Yesenin, Sergei's cousin
- Sergey Perelygin as Alyoshin
- Sergey Astakhov as Schneider
- Aleksei Maklakov as Pyotr Chagin
- Nikita Tarasov as Sergey Gorodetsky
- Sergey Kuryshev as Grigori Rasputin
- Oleg Mazurov as Yakulov
- Mikhail Krylov as Wolf Erlich
- Pelageya as the neighbor girl in the village

== Production ==
Scenes depicting Italy were shot in Odessa and the ones in Paris were filmed in Venice. Other locations included Konstantinovo, Yaroslavl, St. Petersburg and Moscow. Principal photography lasted for 155 days.

Gary Busey insisted that a fight scene would be written in the script specially for him.

When Zaitsev was ill, Sergei Bezrukov served as director. He was also the creative producer and the one who decided to hire Sean Young for the role of Isadora Duncan.

Konstantin Khabensky would later reprise his role as Leon Trotsky in the 2017 TV series.
