= Girls Got Game =

- Official poster in English
- Directed by: Maksim Sveshnikov (ru)
- Written by: Maksim Sveshnikov; Vadim Sveshnikov; Eduard Bordukov
- Produced by: Artyom Vitkin; Grigory Granovsky; Mikhail Dvorkovich; Maksim Sveshnikov; Anna Dragunkina; Mikhail Kolodyazhnyy
- Starring: Lyubov Aksyonova; Egor Koreshkov; Yuliya Topolnitskaya; Alina Alekseeva; Aleksandra Kuzenkina; Polina Aug; Mariya Ivakova; Valentina Lyapina; Zarina Mukhitdinova
- Cinematography: Kirill Begishev
- Music by: Dmitry Emelyanov
- Production companies: Revolution Film; Russian World Vision; Cinema Fund
- Distributed by: Nashe Kino (Our Cinema)
- Release date: September 1, 2021
- Running time: 90 minutes
- Country: Russia
- Language: Russian
- Budget: ₽92.3 million
- Box office: $185 thousand

Girls Got Game (Russian: Нефутбол, romanized: Nefutbol, lit. 'Non-football') is a 2021 Russian sports comedy film directed by Maksim Sveshnikov. It was theatrically released in Russia on September 1, 2021, by Nashe Kino (English: Our Cinema).

== Plot ==
Dasha "Danya" Belykh was told from childhood that football is not a woman's business, but she still became the captain of the football team. Here are just her team unexpectedly gathered to close. Only victory can save them. And Danya decides to gather her childhood friends, with whom she played football at school. It turns out to be not so easy, and then there is a coach - a former "star" with problems, who does not consider women's football to be football at all ... But having sent self-doubt, excess weight and problems on the personal front to the bench, the girls are eager to win not only in sports, but also in life.

== Cast ==
- Lyubov Aksyonova as Daria "Danya" Belykh, captain of the football team
- Egor Koreshkov as Vadim Panov, coach
- Yuliya Topolnitskaya as Alina
- Alina Alekseeva as Nadya
- Aleksandra Kuzenkina as Lena Terekhina
- Polina Aug as Yulya Malysheva
- Mariya Ivakova as Kristina
- Valentina Lyapina as Ekaterina "Katya" Panova, the team's striker, Vadim Panov's daughter
- Zarina Mukhitdinova as Aliya
- Roman Madyanov as Palych
- Dmitry Miller as Kudryavtsev
- Mikhail Kremer as Artyom

== Production ==
Filming took place in the city of Taganrog, Rostov Oblast, and the local metallurgical plant "TAGMET" became one of the key locations.
