= Eastern Boys =

- Film poster
- Directed by: Robin Campillo
- Written by: Robin Campillo
- Produced by: Hugues Charbonneau; Marie-Ange Luciani
- Starring: Olivier Rabourdin; Kirill Emelyanov; Danil Vorobyev
- Cinematography: Jeanne Lapoirie
- Edited by: Robin Campillo
- Music by: Arnaud Rebotini
- Distributed by: Sophie Dulac Distribution
- Release dates: September 5, 2013 (Venice); September 8, 2013 (TIFF); April 2, 2014 (France)
- Running time: 128 minutes
- Country: France
- Languages: French, Russian, English
- Budget: €2.2 million
- Box office: €3 million

Eastern Boys is a 2013 French romantic thriller film written and directed by Robin Campillo. It premiered at the 70th Venice International Film Festival in the Orizzonti section and was later screened in the Contemporary World Cinema section at the 2013 Toronto International Film Festival.

== Plot ==
Marek, a young Ukrainian immigrant in Paris, works the street in front of the Gare du Nord with his Eastern European friends. He is approached by Daniel, a French businessman in his 50s, self-consciously cruising at the station, and agrees to visit him at his home at 6pm the following day.

The next evening, Daniel is unnerved to find a 14-year-old boy at his door, declaring himself to be 'Marek'. The boy pushes past him into the apartment and proceeds to chide him for allegedly inviting him, a minor, to his home for sex. A while later the door knocks again and the boy lets in two other Eastern European young men. Soon, to Daniel's horror, they are joined by the rest of the gang, including 'Boss', their Russian leader. Daniel stands by helplessly as the men mount a full-fledged invasion. As they disperse around his well-appointed apartment, helping themselves to its facilities, Boss taunts Daniel about his helplessness and repressed homosexuality, before suggesting to him that it was he who invited them over. He soon launches a raucous party in Daniel's living room, as the other young men strip the apartment of his belongings.

Later in the evening the real Marek arrives, and joins in the dancing, seemingly unclouded by guilt. The next day, Daniel wakes to a trashed and emptied apartment.

As Daniel slowly begins refurbishing his home, and life seems to be returning to normal, Marek visits again. After Daniel yields to his repeated entreats for entry, and opens the door, the young man bluntly offers sex. Daniel agrees after some hesitation. They move to the bedroom, where Marek coldly lies on his side, as Daniel thrusts into him before quickly finishing. Daniel hands Marek a 50 euro note before he hurriedly leaves.

To his surprise, Marek returns a few days later. This time, after they undress, Daniel brings Marek to climax, before he silently climbs under the covers, and goes off to sleep. Daniel wakes to find Marek no longer beside him, but finds him in the kitchen, eating leftovers. Wordlessly, Daniel gathers items from the refrigerator, and they end up sharing a meal.

Over the following weeks, Marek becomes a regular fixture in Daniel's life, and gradually learns to speak French. While grocery shopping one evening, Marek tells Daniel that he grew up in Chechnya, that both of his parents were casualties in the war, and reveals that his name is actually Rouslan. Back at the apartment, Rouslan tells Daniel that he trusts him, before accusing him of not caring enough to trust him in return. That night, Daniel refuses Rouslan's advances for the first time. When that makes him upset, he tells him that he's 'such a kid'.

Shortly after, Daniel suggests that Rouslan look for a job, saying that he can't live only on his 50 euros. He asks Rouslan to begin sleeping in a bed in the office, rather than in his own. Rouslan grudgingly complies but has a nightmare triggered by fireworks going off nearby. He wakes fearfully, and Daniel finds him dazed, in the living area. Rouslan breaks down, demanding to know why Daniel no longer wants him and afraid that he will make him leave. Daniel assures him that he will not, that he merely wants them to stop sleeping together. He reveals that he wants Rouslan to begin a new life, one that he can help establish. He invites Rouslan to move into his apartment and tells him to break ties with the gang.

Rouslan's passport (along with other gang member's papers) is held by Boss at a cheap, city-limits hotel that serves as the gang's base. Rouslan ventures to the hotel to retrieve it. Although he steals Boss' key to the locker that holds the documents, he is discovered by Boss while trying to find the locker. He is muscled back up to their floor, where Boss assaults Rouslan, smashes his cell phone, and has the other boys tie him up — leaving him restrained in a private storage room.

Daniel becomes worried when he can't reach Rouslan by his cell phone, and drives out to the hotel. When the concierge is unable to confirm Rouslan's whereabouts, Daniel takes a room, at her suggestion, on the second floor, where the immigrants are housed. As she escorts him to the room, they both hear a faint groaning coming from the storage room. Although the concierge brushes this off at first, when Daniel calls down to the front desk shortly after, she explains that the immigrants are managed by Social Services and, as such, are out of her jurisdiction. As Daniel becomes increasingly concerned, she suggests that they call the police. Daniel explains that he must find another way that will not result in Rouslan being arrested and deported.

Daniel ventures back into the hotel corridor and calls out to Rouslan at the door to the storage room. Rouslan, bound and gagged, responds with muffled cries. Realising he must act swiftly, Daniel moves his car into the underground parking lot, then uses the stair access to return to the front desk. With a sense of unspoken agreement, he and the concierge return to the second floor, where she uses her pass key to unlock the storage room. Having played her vital role, the concierge quickly returns to her work, as Daniel moves Rouslan, still tied-up, to his hotel room before the gang members can discover them.

When Boss discovers that someone has unlocked the storage room door and allowed Rouslan to escape, he accuses a junior hotel staff member, before punching him. Hearing the commotion, Daniel sees an opportunity and calls the police to the hotel. As the concierge confronts the immigrants, Daniel uses a fire extinguisher to break into the locker and retrieve Rouslan's papers.

The police arrive and swarm the hotel, while Daniel carries a badly beaten Rouslan down the stairwell to his car in the underground parking lot. As he is lowering Rouslan into the rear of his hatchback, Boss attacks the two of them, pushing Daniel aside and pummeling Rouslan with his fists. Daniel scrambles back to his feet before launching at Boss and choking him up against a concrete pillar.

As the police round up the last of the immigrants, Daniel and Rouslan drive away to seeming safety. Boss avoids arrest and discovers Rouslan's apartment key in the pocket of a leather jacket. Seeing an opportunity to exact revenge, Boss travels to Daniel's apartment, only to discover that just the shell of the rooms remain — Daniel and Rouslan have left the apartment behind.

Months later, Daniel seeks to adopt Rouslan. They are told that because of the unconventional circumstances of their association, they'll receive a decision in the fall. As they leave the courthouse, their solicitor encourages them to be patient, telling them that it is a routine adoption and that there is no reason for their plea to be denied.

== Cast ==
- Olivier Rabourdin as Daniel
- Kirill Emelyanov as Marek / Rouslan
- Daniil Vorobyov as Boss (as Danil Vorobyev)
- Edéa Darcque as Chelsea
- Camila Chakirova as Camila
- Beka Markozashvili as Petit Marek
- Bislan Yakhiaev as Bislan
- Mohamed Doukouzov as Mohamed
- Aitor Bourgade as Guillaume

== Reception ==
The film was critically lauded upon its release. On Rotten Tomatoes, the film received an approval rating of 89%, based on 37 reviews, with an average rating of 7.70/10. The site's critical consensus reads: "Thoughtful, unpredictable, and overall gripping, Eastern Boys fills its sprawling running time with compelling themes and sharply drawn characters brought to life by powerful performances and deft direction."

Many critics noted Campillo's deftness for oscillating between different movie genres. Guy Lodge, reporting from the Venice Film Festival for Variety, praised its versatility, calling it "by turns a frightening home-invasion drama, a tender love story and a tense hide-and-seek thriller". Other critics, like Farran Smith Nehme of the New York Post and Dave Calhoun of Time Out, were less enthusiastic about the final act of the film, criticizing it for its slippage into generic thriller territory.

The cinematography by Jeanne Lapoirie was regularly praised in reviews, in particular for the opening scene, where the camera follows the main character cruising around Gare du Nord, in a style evoking footage from surveillance cameras. Jonathan Romney of Film Comment likened Lapoiries wide-angle camera style to the works of Swedish director Ruben Östlund, commending her for her work in delineating the movie's characters from the station crowd.

== Accolades ==
| Award / Film Festival | Category | Recipients | Result |
|---|---|---|---|
| César Awards | Best Film | | Nominated |
| César Awards | Best Director | Robin Campillo | Nominated |
| César Awards | Most Promising Actor | Kirill Emelyanov | Nominated |
| International Festival of Independent Cinema PKO Off Camera | Kraków Film Award | | Won |
| Louis Delluc Prize | Best Film | | Nominated |
| Prix Jacques Prévert du Scénario | Best Original Screenplay | Robin Campillo | Nominated |
| Santa Barbara International Film Festival | Best International Film Award | | Won |
| Venice Film Festival | Horizons Award for Best Film | | Won |
