= The Frog Princess (2025 film) =

- Directed by: Aleksandr Amirov
- Written by: Olga Klemesheva; Vladimir Kuksin; Vasiliy Rovenskiy
- Produced by: Diana Buzurkieva; Marina Kaplunova; Aleksandr Novikov; Maksim Rogalskiy; Vasiliy Rovenskiy; Ekaterina Shavlova
- Starring: Valentina Lyapina; Aleksandr Metyolkin; Nikita Kologrivyy; Roman Kurtsyn; Alisa Rudenko; Viktor Loginov; Yelena Ksenofontova; Svetlana Permyakova; Zhanna Markevich; Kirill Batishta
- Cinematography: Arseny Kozin
- Music by: Anton Gryzlov
- Production companies: Nashe kino Production; KinoFirma
- Distributed by: Nashe kino (English: Our Cinema)
- Release date: March 6, 2025 (Russia)
- Country: Russia
- Language: Russian

The Frog Princess (Russian: Царевна-лягушка) is a 2025 Russian fantasy comedy film directed by Aleksandr Amirov, based on the Russian fairy tale The Frog Princess. It stars Valentina Lyapina, Aleksandr Metyolkin, Nikita Kologrivyy, and Roman Kurtsyn. The film was written by Olga Klemesheva, Vladimir Kuksin, Vasiliy Rovenskiy and produced by Diana Buzurkieva, Marina Kaplunova, Aleksandr Novikov, Maksim Rogalskiy, Vasiliy Rovenskiy, and Ekaterina Shavlova. The soundtrack for the film was written by Anton Gryzlov. Arseny Kozin was the film's cinematographer.

This film was theatrically released on March 6, 2025, by Nashe Kino Film Distribution. A sequel, titled The Frog Princess 2, was released in March 2026.

== Plot ==
The film tells the story of a frog who lives in a city park pond and loves watching movies at the outdoor cinema. Suddenly, she sees a cartoon in which another frog, having caught an arrow, turns into a beautiful woman. This makes such a strong impression on her that she believes it really happened and decides to find the arrow.

== Cast ==
- Valentina Lyapina as Vasilisa
- Aleksandr Metyolkin as Ivan
- Nikita Kologrivyy as Koshchey
- Roman Kurtsyn as Lyagush
- Alisa Rudenko as Varya
- Viktor Loginov
- Yelena Ksenofontova
- Svetlana Permyakova as Yaginya
- Zhanna Markevich
- Kirill Batishta

== Production ==
=== Filming ===
Filming took place in the Leningrad Oblast and Saint Petersburg.
