= Papy (2022 film) =

Dads
- Directed by: Armen Ananikyan; Anna Matison; Karen Oganesyan; Sergey Yudakov
- Written by: Vladislava Amangeldyeva; Timur Ezugbaya; Aleksey Gravitskiy
- Produced by: Armen Ananikyan; Sergey Bezrukov; Mikhail Galustyan; Mikhail Pogosov
- Starring: Dmitry Nagiyev; Sergey Bezrukov; Yuri Stoyanov; Mark Bogatyryov; Igor Jijikine; Vladislav Semiletkov; Yuliya Rutberg; Karina Andolenko
- Cinematography: Oleg Efremov
- Release date: February 23, 2022
- Country: Russia
- Language: Russian

Dads (Russian: Папы, romanized: Papy, lit. 'Dads') is a 2022 Russian children's comedy-drama film directed by Armen Ananikyan, Anna Matison, Karen Oganesyan and Sergey Yudakov. It stars Dmitry Nagiyev and Sergey Bezrukov. It is scheduled to be theatrically released on February 23, 2022.

== Plot ==
The film will tell four stories on the theme of father's love, about how different relationships with dads are, about the fact that, despite our age, we will always remain children for our fathers.

== Cast ==
- Dmitry Nagiyev as Dr Volkov
- Sergey Bezrukov as Alexandr
- Yuri Stoyanov as Vasily Vinogradov
- Vadim Demchog as Vasin
- Mark Bogatyryov as Doctor Zakharov
- Mikhail Galustyan as Galustyan
- Igor Jijikine as Konstantin
- Vladislav Semiletkov as Artyom
- Yuliya Rutberg as Inessa Andreyevna
- Lera Kudryavtseva as the TV host
- Olesya Zheleznyak as Elena Mishina
- Anatoliy Kotenyov as the general
- Karina Andolenko as Natasha
