= Ekaterina Durova =

Russian actress (1959–2019)

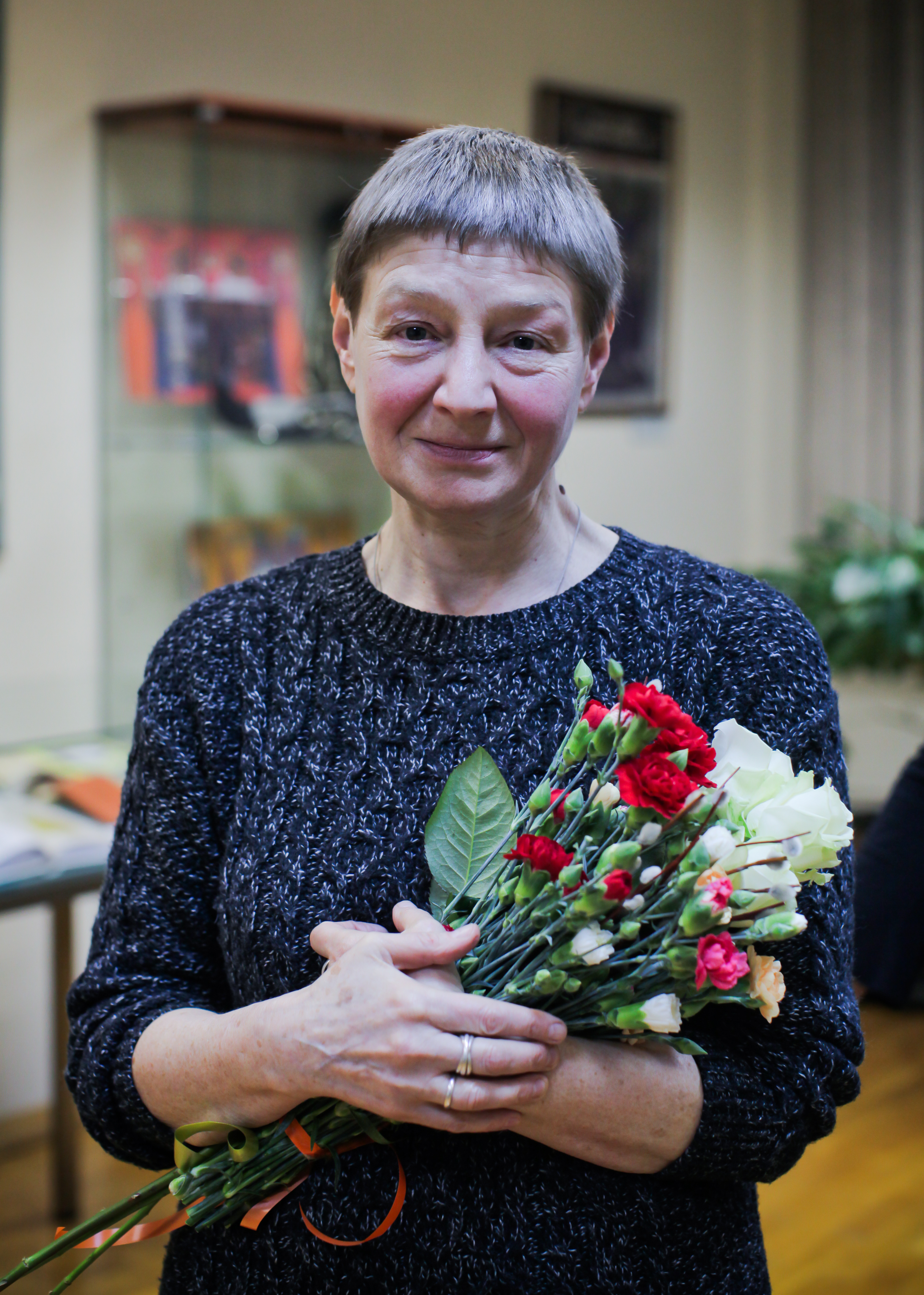
- Born: Ekaterina Lvovna Durova; 25 July 1959; Moscow, Russian SSR
- Died: 13 December 2019 (aged 60); Moscow, Russia
- Occupation: Actress
- Years active: 1977–2019

Ekaterina Lvovna Durova (Russian: Екатери́на Льво́вна Ду́рова; 25 July 1959 – 13 December 2019) was a Russian actress. She was honored as a Merited Artist of the Russian Federation in 2005.

== Biography ==
Durova was born on 25 July 1959 in Moscow. She was born into a family of actors, as her father was famed Soviet theatre actor Lev Durov, and her mother, Irina Kirichenko, was also an actress. In 1976, she enrolled in the Russian Academy of Theatre Arts and obtained her degree in 1984. After her education, she was an actress who starred in theatrical performances at the Taganka Theatre in Moscow. She then worked at the Moscow Drama Theater on Malaya Bronnaya, where she would stay until her death.

In addition to her theatrical performances, Durova appeared in numerous films. She made her debut on screen playing a student in the teen melodrama School Waltz in 1977. She would then receive a starring role in Faratyev's Fantasies (1982).

Durova married two actors, with her first husband being Sergei Nasibov, and her second being Vladimir Ershov.

== Filmography ==
- School Waltz (1978)
- Faratyev's Fantasies (1979)
- Dulsinea del Toboso (1980)
- Phenomenon (1983)
- The Green Van (1983)
- The Admirer (1999)
- Yuri's Day (2008)
- Crush (2009)
- Widow 's Steamer (2010)
- One Particular Pioneer (2013)
- 23.59 (2016)
- Bloody Mistress (2018)
