= The Fortress in Badaber =

- Genre: War film; Drama
- Created by: Kirill Belevich
- Country of origin: Russia
- Original language: Russian
- No. of seasons: 1
- No. of episodes: 4

Production
- Executive producer: Kirill Belevich
- Running time: 3 hours 0 minutes
- Production companies: "GPM KIT" in conjunction with "KITUDI KIT" and "Producer Center Ivan"

Original release
- Network: Channel One Russia
- Release: February 2018

The Fortress in Badaber (Russian: Крепость Бадабер) is a Russian TV series about the events that occurred during the Afghan War. In the center of the plot is an uprising in the camp of Badaber. The uprising in Badaber camp was an episode of the Afghan war, during which on April 26, 1985 an unequal battle took place between the detachments of Afghan Mujahideen and the units of the regular Pakistani Army supporting them, on the one hand, and a group of Soviet and Afghan prisoners of war, on the other. The attempt of prisoners of war to free themselves from the camp failed. As a result of the two-day storming of the Badaber camp with the use artillery, the majority of prisoners of war were killed. The film, however, was created to show the union of Russians, and to show what the Russian hostages of the camp in Badaber went through.

== Plot ==
Afghanistan, spring of 1985. A column of the Soviet servicemen near the border with Pakistan detects the Soviet soldier who is tied with barbed wire to the barrier by mujahideen, who using the proximity of the border, constantly make raids to the neighboring territory. In Pakistan, in the fortress of Badaber, under the leadership of American instructors, militants are being trained. There is a need of an operation in Pakistan to neutralize them. The Minister of Defense of the Soviet Union will give an order to get rid of the fortress only after conducting the reconnaissance operation. The responsible for this must be the General Kolesov. The contractor must be the captain of the Main Intelligence Directorate (GRU), Yuri Nikitin. Kolesov personally arrives at the house of Nikitin, outside Moscow, where Nikitin, suspended from operations, lives with his wife Svetlana. However, she does not want to let her husband go to Afghanistan. Under the instructions of the GRU, the scout, Yuri Nikitin, disguised as a slave, enters the Pakistan fortress of Badaber. Nikitin must collect evidence of the existence of a training center for mujaheddin under the leadership of the CIA, and then, he must send a signal to the Russian commanders that they send missiles to blow the base. Yuri makes a few shots, but because of the threat to be declassified, he throws the camera at the last moment. Then, he meets the local goldsmith who shows Nikitin the Soviet soldier medallions, one of which belongs to Nikitin's best friend – Mikhail Kolesov, who is already considered to be missing in the Soviet Union. So, Nikitin understands that in the fortress there is a secret prisoner of war camp – the Soviet soldiers – who are kept and may suffer during the storming of Badaber. In this way, contrary to the original task of the GRU, the scout joins his compatriots. Nikitin goes into the fortress and sees on the territory of the fortress a group of Russian prisoners of war, among whom he recognizes his best friend Mikhail, the son of his commander, General Kolesov, who was considered missing for several years. Nikitin decided to stay and save the doomed to death the Russian soldiers. Once imprisoned, he inspires them to revolt.

== Cast ==
- Sergey Marin - Yuri Nikitin (the main role – the captain of GRU)
- Svetlana Ivanova - Svetlana (the wife of Nikitin)
- Sergey Colesnikov - Sergey Vladimirovich Kolesov (the general of GRU)
- Mikhail Dzhanibekyan - Hafiz (the militiaman of the Afghan Sarandoy)
- Ramil Sabitov - Amir
- Alexander Alyoshkin - Ivanov
- Irina Rozanova - Irina (the wife of the general Kolesov)
- Vasily Mishenko - Sokolov (the minister of war, the marshal)
- Ily Malanin - Mikhail (a son of Kolesov, a friend of Nikitin)
- Alexander Fisenko - Ivolgin (the battalion commander)
- Stanislav Kurach - Sichov (staff officer, lieutenant-general)
- Marcin Stec - Jeffers (CIA instructor) etc.

== Information about the film ==
Producer	Kirill Belevich
Screenwriter	Dmitry Aleinikov
Operator	Yuri Korobeinikov
Composer	Sergey Dudakov
Artist	Zhanna Pakhomova
Producers	Konstantin Ernst (gene), Sergey Titinkov (gene), Janik Faiziev (gene), Rafael Minasbekyan (gene), Alexander Bondarev (II) (gene), Alexey Akhmedov, Maxim Kovalevich, Tatyana Vengerova (IPP), Dmitry Zaitsev (II) (IPS)
Casting Director	Natalia Troitskaya (II)
Actors	Sergei Marin, Svetlana Ivanova, Sergey Kolesnikov (II), Mikael Janibekyan, Ramil Sabitov, Alexander Alyoshkin, Irina Rozanova, Vasily Mishchenko, Ilya Malanin, Alexander Fisenko, Stanislav Kurach, Marcin Stets, Artem Melnichuk, Ilya Noskov (II), Kirill Belevich -Obolensky, Maxim Belbordov, Vyacheslav Subrakov, Nikita Kologrivyy, Danil Mozhaev, Dmitry Sokolov (VI), Konstantin Balakirev, Vsevolod Shergin, Yervand Sargsyan, Vitali Kishchenko, Oleg Schastlivtsev, Vyacheslav Gumerov, Rustam Achmiz, etc.
Production	"GPM KIT" in conjunction with "KITUDI KIT" and "Producer Center Ivan"
Premiere	February 12, 2018 (Channel One, Russia)
Genre	war film, drama
Premiere	(world) 12/02/2018
Time	3 hours 0 minutes
Length of the series	45 min.
Number of episodes	4 series
Number of seasons	1

== Facts about the film ==
- The film was made based on real events that occurred during the Afghan war.
- After the bombing of the fortress, only one participant of the uprising survived, after which he returned to the USSR.
- The fighting scenes were shot in the sandy quarry of the Krasnodar Territory, especially for the filming there were brought the old Soviet military technique of the 80s.
- In 1993, a film was produced based on the events in Badaber – "Peshawar Waltz".

== Mistakes in the film ==
- In the series, the prisoners have tokens, although at that time even the officers did not have them.
- Flak jackets on soldiers are more modern than those that were used at that time.
- The protagonist of the series moves freely around the territory of the camp, which would naturally be impossible.
- Afghan mujahideen use AKS-74 assault rifles, which were not used by them in that war, as they could not produce cartridges for them.

== Episodes ==
Season	Episode #	Title	Description
Season 1 (2018)	01	The beginning of the mission	In early April 1985, General Kolesov returned from the Afghan-Pakistan border, where he saw the brutality of the Mujahideen in the fortress of Badaber. He asks the minister to authorize a ground operation to destroy this base, promising that his agent Yuri Nikitin will obtain reconnaissance data for the operation and evidence of the presence of Americans at the training grounds of the camp. After a week of training, Nikitin, under the guise of a slave and accompanied by a local militiaman Hafiz, enters the fortress. He takes photos, but at the last moment throws the camera to avoid getting caught. After, he meets the local goldsmith, Yamam, who shows Nikitin soldiers' medallions, one of which belongs to the best friend of Yuri Mikhail Kolesov. Nikitin understands that in the old fortress of Badaber, it is possible that there are the Russian prisoners who, under ground operations, may suffer.
Season 1 (2018)	02	To save the prisoners	Having arranged a small explosion at night, Nikitin penetrates inside the fortress and takes photos of the Russian prisoners. With the help of Mikhail Kolesov and the prisoner Naryshkin, he removes Babader's communications and the location of the guns inside the perimeter. He passes the film to Hafiz and sends him to the place agreed upon, according to the plan of meeting with Kolesov. He, himself, decides to surrender in order to try to warn the prisoners about the operation, and to help its implementation from within with the help of the prisoners.
Season 1 (2018)	03	Escape	Nikitin expounds the prisoners the task: it is necessary to organize the capture of the base and escape, divided into three groups. The Russian soldiers do not believe in his plan: the option to penetrate the fortress was not worked out at all, if Yuri does not contact and notify the exact time of the operation, the special forces can run into an ambush. And at this time Nikitin is twisted, and the stuff of the fortress leads him to the Colonel Jeffers, who arrived to deal with him. Nikitin manages to "bargain" a call to his wife and, using old codes, give the general information about the uprising.
Season 1 (2018)	04	Battle	Contrary to the order, the General Kolesov flew to Afghanistan to provide at least some help to Nikitin, if it is possible. While the soldiers are firing, Yuri takes Jeffers hostage, thereby forcing his people to lay down their arms and leave the base. Nikitin and his fighters beat off another attack of the Mujahideen. Then, when a connection with Kolesov appears, he reports that there will be no help – there are no grounds for the operation, but he, himself, is ready to meet the prisoners at the border, covering them with fire. Then, Nikitin offers a different option.
