= High Security Vacation =

- Directed by: Igor Zaytsev
- Written by: Andrei Kivinov; Fyodor Krestovy
- Produced by: Anatoly Maksimov; Janik Fayziev; Nikolai Popov
- Starring: Sergey Bezrukov; Dmitri Dyuzhev
- Cinematography: Antoine Vivas Denisov
- Music by: Ruslan Muratov
- Production companies: Direktsiya Kino; Buzz Production; Channel One Russia
- Distributed by: 20th Century Fox
- Release date: 25 August 2009
- Running time: 113 minutes
- Country: Russia
- Language: Russian
- Budget: $5 million
- Box office: $17.5 million

High Security Vacation (Russian: Каникулы строгого режима, romanized: Kanikuly strogogo rezhima) is a 2009 Russian adventure comedy film directed by Igor Zaytsev.

== Plot ==
Viktor Sumarokov – experienced thief-recidivist nicknamed Sumrak is a person of authority to all prisoners. Yevgeny Koltsov is a former Ministry of Internal Affairs employee who is a well-deserved hero for courageous fighting in Chechnya. As a result of carelessness, he accidentally hurts a venal colleague. When the former lawman becomes imprisoned, chief of the penitentiary, lieutenant colonel UFSIN Vyshkin comes to Sumrak with a request to protect Koltsov from the threats of prisoners.

The ringleader's closest aide learns that he wants to protect Koltsov (since the higher authorities have arrived for a holiday arranged on the premises, and problems connected with the death of the prisoner-militiaman would be detrimental) and using the promise of an early release he persuades another inmate authority, Shaman, to start a commotion and remove Koltsov with the goal being to undermine Vyshkin. A fight begins in which Koltsov gets wounded and he is taken to the hospital together with wounded Sumarokov. Having recovered himself in the hospital, Koltsov realizes that he can not survive in the zone until Shaman retreats. Then he asks his combat friend, commander of the special forces of the Federal Penitentiary Service Sergey Gagarin, to help him escape from the hospital. In the process of suppressing the riot in the zone, Sumarokov is wounded by special forces. Koltsov trusts Sumrak and takes him along.

Gagarin hides the escaped convicts in a pioneer camp called "Shipboy", which is short of male leaders. They take the names Victor Sergeevich Romashkin and Yevgeny Dmitrievich Ubegaev. Keeping to pioneer tradition, the children mock their leaders at every opportunity. While trying to make their squad the best and win a trip to St. Petersburg, the two former convicts discover qualities in themselves that they had not known they had.

== Cast ==
- Sergey Bezrukov as Viktor 'Sumrak' Sumarokov
- Dmitri Dyuzhev as Evgeni Koltsov
- Alyona Babenko as Tatyana Panteleeva
- Vladimir Menshov as Nikolai Vyshkin
- Lyudmila Polyakova as Zinaida Obraztsova
- Aleksey Kravchenko as Sergey Gagarin
- Sabina Akhmedova as Lena Bichkina
- Roman Madyanov as Klyk

== Reception ==
The film received positive reviews.
