= Young Man (film) =

2022 Russian film by Alexandr Fomin

- Directed by: Alexandr Fomin
- Written by: Alexandr Fomin
- Produced by: Ekaterina Kononenko; Ruben Adamyan; Dmitry Litvinov; Ilya Naishuller; Lika Blank; Dmitry Svit; Leonid Litvak
- Starring: Pavel Tabakov; Danila Kozlovsky; Ingrid Olerinskaya; Valentina Lyapina; Danila Poperechny
- Cinematography: Mikhail Solovyov
- Edited by: Vladislav Kaptur
- Production companies: Versus Pictures; ID Production; Gorky Film Studios
- Distributed by: KaroRental
- Release date: June 9, 2022
- Country: Russia
- Language: Russian

Young Man (Russian: Молодой человек, romanized: Molodoy chelovek) is a 2022 Russian comedy film written and directed by Alexandr Fomin. It was theatrically released on June 9, 2022.

== Plot ==
In his childhood, Vanya Revzin studied tirelessly day and night. His mother sincerely believed that he would succeed in life, but in the end, he amounted to nothing. He was fired from his job, and his wife left him. Convinced that only cunning could help him achieve anything, he decides to impersonate a seventeen-year-old teenager.

== Cast ==
- Pavel Tabakov as Vanya Revzin
  - Klim Berdinsky as young Vanya Revzin
- Danila Kozlovsky as Kolya Kovpinets
  - Vlad Feldman as young Kolya Kovpinets
- Danila Poperechny as Pasha
- Ingrid Olerinskaya as Lera
- Valentina Lyapina as Nastya
- Rakhim Abramov as Arthur
- Egor Kiryachok as Egor

== Production ==
Director Alexandr Fomin presented the film back in 2019 at the face-to-face defense of projects applying for state support from the Cinema Foundation. The director of the films Hardcore Henry (2015 film) and Nobody (2021 film) carefully followed the production of the film and tried to support the young director, for whom the film Young Man became a feature-length debut.

The filming process was led by Versus Pictures and ID Production with the participation of the Gorky Film Studios. The idea of the film came to director Alexandr Fomin two years ago, and he approached Ilya Naishuller with it. He agreed without hesitation.

Filming began on May 31, 2021 and took place in the village of Petrovo-Dalneye, Moscow Oblast, and near Moscow.
