= August (2025 film) =

- Directed by: Nikita Vysotsky; Ilya Lebedev
- Written by: Sergey Snezhkin; Vladimir Bogomolov
- Based on: The Moment of Truth of In August of 1944 by Vladimir Bogomolov
- Produced by: Anatoly Maksimov; Konstantin Ernst; Artem Sudzhyan; Viktoriya Demidova; Anna Asriants; Ksenia Starostina; Georgy Rozinov
- Starring: Sergey Bezrukov; Nikita Kologrivyy; Pavel Tabakov; Ilya Isayev; Roman Madyanov; Daniil Vorobyov; Kirill Kuznetsov; Aleksey Vertkov
- Cinematography: Maksim Shinkorenko; Yevgeny Mlyukov
- Edited by: Ilya Lebedev
- Music by: Dmitry Emelyanov
- Production companies: Cinema Directorate Studio; Channel One; Cinema Fund
- Distributed by: Central Partnership
- Release date: September 25, 2025 (Russia)
- Running time: 150 minutes
- Country: Russia
- Language: Russian
- Budget: ₽860 million
- Box office: ₽1.5 billion; $20 million

August (Russian: Август) is a 2025 Russian war drama film directed by Nikita Vysotsky and Ilya Lebedev, based on Vladimir Bogomolov's novel The Moment of Truth, also known as In August of 1944. It stars Sergey Bezrukov, Nikita Kologrivyy and Pavel Tabakov.

This film was theatrically released in Russia on September 25, 2025, by Central Partnership.

The film received 12 nominations for the 24th Golden Eagle Awards, winning six of them, including Best Feature Film. 7 nominations for the 39th Nika Awards ceremony, no wins.

== Plot ==
The film takes place in August 1944, in the forests of Western Belarus. The Red Army is beginning to cross the state border. A stab in the back could prevent this. Will SMERSH counterintelligence agents be able to prevent the attack?

== Cast ==
- Sergey Bezrukov as Captain Pavel Alekhin, SMERSH officer, Operations Group Leader
- Nikita Kologrivyy as Senior Lieutenant Evgeny Tomantsev, SMERSH officer, cleaner, and wolfhound nicknamed "Skorokhvat"
- Pavel Tabakov as Lieutenant Andrei Blinov, SMERSH officer, cleaner-trainee
- Ilya Isaev as Senior Sergeant Arkhip Khizhnyak, sergeant major, group driver
- Roman Madyanov as General Egorov
- Daniil Vorobyov as Lieutenant Colonel Nikolai Polyakov, head of the department
- Kirill Kuznetsov as Captain Igor Anikushin, a captain from the commandant's office
- Aleksey Vertkov
- Ivan Kolesnikov as Major Igor Fomin
- Eldar Kalimulin as Senior Lieutenant Sentsov
- Ilya Malakov as Captain Nikolaev
- Denis Nurulin as a signalman
- Efim Petrunin as Ilya Fomchenko
- Pyotr Logachev as Maxim Goroshnikov
- Roman Vasiliev as Kazimir Pavlovsky, a saboteur
- Tina Stojilkovic as Yulia Antonyuk
- Vera Shpak as Olga Fomina
- Maksim Emelyanov as Mikhail Lopukhin

== Production ==
The development of the project began in 2018, the working title The Moment of Truth was changed to August. The film was created with the support of the Russian Cinema Fund.

=== Filming ===
The Principal photography competition was originally scheduled to take place in Western Belarus in 2022. It took place in 2022–2023 in Karelia, the Leningrad, Rostov, and Kaliningrad regions.

== Release ==
The film's theatrical release date was originally set for March 27, 2025. The Central Partnership company acts as the distributor, but the film was not released on time.

On April 25, 2025, a new release date for the film was announced - September 25, 2025.

== Reception ==
=== Box office ===
In its first month of release, box office receipts exceeded 1 billion rubles. August became the eighth Russian film to reach this level in 2025. By the end of 2025, box office receipts had exceeded 1.5 billion rubles.

== See also ==
- In August of 1944 (2001 film)
