= Daniil Vorobyov =

Russian film and theatre actor (born 1981)

- Даниил Воробьев
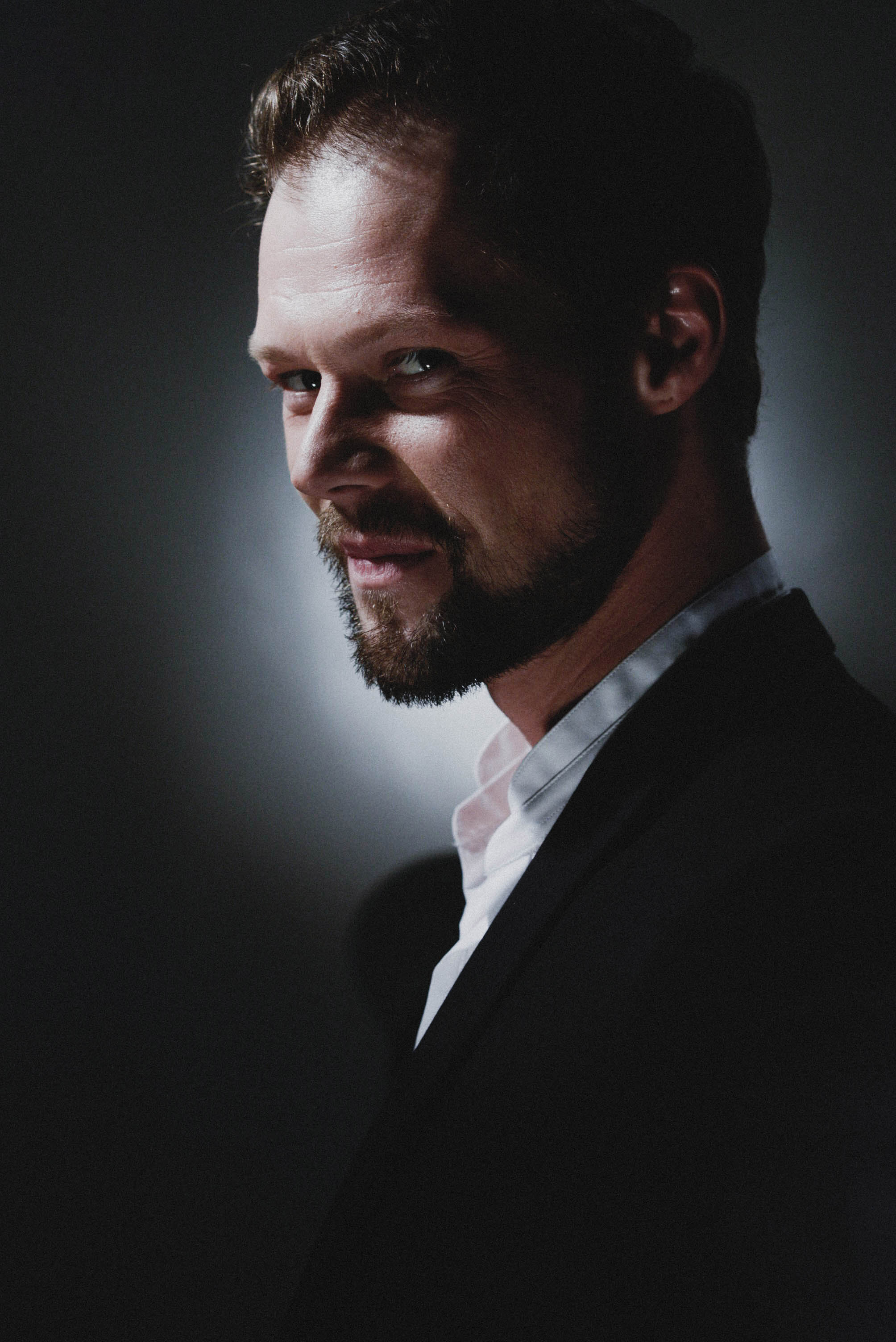
- Daniil Vorobyov is an actor
- Born: Danil Vladimirovich Vorobyov; 30 August 1981 (age 45); Kostroma, RSFSR, USSR
- Education: Gerasimov Institute of Cinematography
- Occupations: Actor, film director
- Years active: 2006–present
- Awards: Angela Awards

Daniil Vladimirovich Vorobyov (Russian: Даниил Владимирович Воробьев; born 30 August 1981) is a Russian film and theatre actor.

== Early life ==
Daniil Vorobyov was born in Kostroma, Russian SFSR, Soviet Union. The son of Vladimir Vorobyov, a jazz musician, and Svetlana Yurovskaya. At the age of 14, he started to work on local radio station as a DJ. Later, he began to run parties as MC in the city night club. Because of night life and the dubious glory his mother decided it's time to Daniil to join the army. After two years a military service Daniil moved to Moscow to change the course of life and to make his childhood dream come true. He went to Gerasimov Institute of Cinematography and had successfully applied. Was entering the acting course supervised by Alexander Lenkov. In the second year of study, Daniil made his film debut in TV series Junker'a. Afterwards, he starred at The voice of fish and it proved to be a breakthrough for Daniil.

== Career ==
In 2012, he starred as charismatic Boss, a leader of Eastern European criminal gang, in Robin Campillo's film Eastern Boys. In 2013, film won at Venice Film Festival in category Horizons Award for Best Film. In 2015, film was nominated for César Award as Best Film.

In 2015, Daniil starred in Paloma Aguilera Valdebenito's Out Of Love, playing Nikolay. Film was selected for IFFR's Bright Future. Daniil received Angela Awards for his portraying of the role. In 2017 Daniil won the RIVIERA IFF as Best Actor for Out Of Love.

In 2016 Vorobyov starred opposite Julia Stiles and Iwan Rheon in Riviera, crime series from Neil Jordan.

== Selected filmography ==
Year	Title	Russian Title	Role	Notes
2006	Junker	Юнкера	Brunelli	TV series
2010	Bratans 2	Братаны 2	Aleks	TV series
2011–2012	Comrades of police	Товарищи полицейские	Evgeniy Nikitin	TV series
2011	Mantikora	Мантикора		
2012	Summer	Лето		Short
2012	Soulless	Духлесс	Mister X	
2013	Gagarin: First in Space	Гагарин. Первый в космосе	Grigory Nelubov	
2013	Eastern Boys	Мальчики с Востока	Boss	
2015	Metamorphosis	Метаморфозис	Sledovatel	
2016	Out of Love	Ненависть	Nikolaj	Angela Awards
2016	Wake Me Up	Разбуди меня	Andrei	
2016	Huh	Че		Short
2016	Riviera	Ривьера	Grigory Litvinov	TV series
2020	Passengers	Пассажиры	Vadim	TV series
2021	Happy End	Edik	TV series	
2023	Kompromat		Sasha Rostov	
2023	Grom: Boyhood	Гром: Трудное детство	Yuri Smirnov	
2024	Kombinaciya	Комбинация	Maksim Bazykin	TV series
2025	Rodnina	Роднина	Alexei Pankratov	
2025	August	Август	Lieutenant Colonel Nikolai Polyakov	
2026	Buratino	Буратино	Feldsher Toad	
