= School Waltz =

- Directed by: Pavel Lyubimov
- Written by: Anna Rodionova
- Starring: Elena Tsyplakova; Sergey Nasibov; Yury Solomin
- Cinematography: Pyotr Kataev
- Music by: Vladimir Shainsky
- Production company: Gorky Film Studio
- Release date: 1978
- Running time: 90 minutes
- Country: Soviet Union
- Language: Russian

School Waltz (Russian: Школьный вальс, romanized: Shkolniy vals) is a 1978 Soviet coming-of-age drama film directed by Pavel Lyubimov.

== Plot ==
Ten-graders Gosha Korablyov and Zosya Knushevitskaya are in love with each other. Before the last bell are only a few days. The young man is planning to become a volcanologist. It seems that after they finish school they will get married. But Dina, who is unrequitedly in love with Gosha, is constantly near him. Her influential parents are ready to ensure a successful life not only for their daughter, but also for the future son-in-law. And when during the final examinations Gosha learns that Zosya is pregnant, he goes to dinner with Dina on the same day. By this time he dances the school waltz with Dina.

Zosya's mother takes her daughter to a hospital from which she ends up escaping, as she does not wish to get rid of the child. Zosya leaves her parents and gets a job at a construction site. Soon she finds out that her parents have separated - they have ceased to love each other a long time ago, but the daughter's departure has finally separated them. Zosya becomes acquainted with new friends. Gosha marries Dina, but their family life does not work from the very beginning. Gosha drinks heavily, and the young couple without having lived together for even a year, break up. At the end of winter Zosya gives birth to a son.

At the evening of graduates, old friends, including Dina, Zosya and Gosha, meet at the school. Together, the former schoolchildren watch a newsreel which they once merrily made of themselves - "for history". The young cameraman shamelessly shot part of this chronicle using a hidden camera - a loving couple, kisses in an empty classroom, kisses in the locker room. An innocent school romance ... Zosya leaves the room, followed by Gosha. Their conversation takes place on an empty school staircase. They still love each other, but Gosha does not know anything about the child. He dropped out of the institute and does not know what to do. Learning about his son, he asks permission to see him. Zosya leaves, leaving the failed volcanologist without answer. Behind her the school with shining windows becomes increasingly distant.

== Cast ==
- Elena Tsyplakova as Zosya Knushevitskaya
- Sergey Nasibov as Gosha Korablev
- Yury Solomin as Pavel, father of Zosya
- Natalia Vilkina as Ella, the mother of Zosya
- Yevgeniya Simonova as Dina Solovyova
- Nina Menshikova as Dina's mother
- Elena Fetisenko as girlfriend of Zosya
- Ekaterina Durova as nurse in the hospital
- Viktor Proskurin as foreman
- Victor Kamayev as Dina's father
- Antonina Dmitrieva as school director
- Natalya Khorokhorina as construction worker
