= Igor Zaytsev =

- Born: Igor Grigoryevich Zaytsev; March 14, 1961 (age 64); Krasnyi Luch, Soviet Union
- Citizenship: Russian Federation
- Occupation(s): film director, screenwriter, actor

Igor Zaytsev (Russian: Игорь Григорьевич Зайцев; born June 16, 1984) is a Russian film director, screenwriter and actor.

== Biography ==
Igor was born on March 14, 1961, in the town of Krasny Luch. He studied at the Rostov College of Arts as a specialty theater actor and at the Boris Shchukin Theatre Institute as a specialty drama director.

== Filmography (selected) ==
- High Security Vacation (2009)
- Bender: The Beginning (2021)
- Bender: Gold of the Empire (2021)
- An Hour Before Dawn (2021)
