= Kombinaciya (TV series) =

2024 Russian biographical drama series

- Комбинация
- Genre: Drama; Comedy
- Directed by: Nikita Vlasov
- Starring: Nikita Kologrivyy; Vladimir Kanukhin; Elizaveta Bazykina; Pavel Priluchny; Anastasiya Ukolova; Daniil Vorobyov
- Music by: Kirill Borodulev; Vitaliy Okorokov
- Country of origin: Russia
- Original language: Russian
- No. of seasons: 1
- No. of episodes: 8

Production
- Producers: Dmitry Nelidov; Aleksandr Syrov; Elena Melnikova; Igor Gudkov
- Cinematography: Kirill Klepalov
- Running time: 50 min.
- Production companies: Wink; NMG Studio; Lunapark Studio

Original release
- Network: Wink; Channel One Russia
- Release: 6 September – 24 October 2024

Kombinaciya (Russian: Комбинация) is a Russian biographical drama television series directed by Nikita Vlasov about the Soviet/Russian girl group Kombinaciya. It stars Nikita Kologrivyy, Elizaveta Bazykina, Pavel Priluchny, Anastasiya Ukolova, and Daniil Vorobyov. The series premiered on the digital platform Wink on September 6, 2024, with a television premiere on Channel One Russia on December 16, 2024.

== Plot ==
The series tells the story of the musical group Kombinaciya, which gained widespread fame in the late 1980s and early 1990s. The action begins in 1988 in Saratov: following the birth of his daughter, Alexander Shishinin decides to completely change his life and begins producing a musical collective he created. It is the first pop group in the USSR consisting entirely of female members.

== Cast ==
- Nikita Kologrivyy as Alexander Shishinin, the group's producer
- Vladimir Kanukhin as Vitaliy Okorokov, composer and co-founder
- Elizaveta Bazykina as singer Tatyana Ivanova
- Pavel Priluchny as producer Alexander Iratov
- Anastasiya Ukolova as singer Alena Apina
- Ekaterina Goncharova as singer Svetlana Kashina
- Daniil Vorobyov as Maksim Bazykin (based on Sergey Lisovsky)
- Dmitry Smolev as lyricist Yuri Druzhkov
- Askar Ilyasov as producer Garri Karimovich (based on Bari Alibasov)
- Polina Gukhman as Yulia Kozyulkova
- Tatyana Struzhenkova as Svetlana Kostyko
- Sofya Volodchinskaya as Nyura Kovaleva
- Igor Tsaregorodtsev as Shuba
- Ulyana Kravets as Natalya Shishinina, Alexander's wife
- Khelga Filippova as Natalya's mother
- Alena Apina as a conservatory teacher
- Vitaliy Okorokov as a recording studio worker
- Stasya Miloslavskaya as Tanya Dolganova
- Roman Evdokimov as Ilya
- Olga Tumaykina as Lena's mother
- Ivan Dobronravov as a fan

== Production and release ==
Development of the series was first announced in December 2023. Production was handled by NMG Studio and Lunapark, with Nikita Vlasov directing. The roles of Alena Apina and Tatyana Ivanova were given to Anastasiya Ukolova and Elizaveta Bazykina, respectively. Pavel Priluchny was cast as Apina's husband, producer Alexander Iratov, while Nikita Kologrivyy portrayed the group's founder Alexander Shishinin. Filming took place in Saratov.

The eight-episode series premiered on the streaming service Wink on September 3, 2024, concluding on October 24. The television premiere followed on December 16, 2024, on Channel One Russia.

== Awards ==
- IX OK! Awards "More than Stars" (2024) – Best Actor in a Series: Nikita Kologrivy for his role in Kombinaciya.
