= The Frog Princess 2 =

- Directed by: Aleksandr Amirov
- Written by: Vasiliy Rovenskiy; Olga Klemeshevo
- Produced by: Maksim Rogalskiy; Vasiliy Rovenskiy; Ekaterina Shavlova; Aleksandr Novikov; Marina Popova
- Starring: Valentina Lyapina; Aleksandr Metyolkin; Nikita Kologrivyy; Alisa Rudenko; Roman Kurtsyn; Svetlana Permyakova; Zhanna Markevich; Viktor Loginov; Yelena Ksenofontova; Kirill Batishta
- Cinematography: Arseny Kozin
- Music by: Anton Gryzlov
- Production company: Nashe kino Production
- Distributed by: Nashe kino (Our Cinema)
- Release date: March 5, 2026 (Russia)
- Country: Russia
- Language: Russian

The Frog Princess 2 (Russian: Царевна-лягушка 2) is a 2025 Russian fantasy comedy film directed by Aleksandr Amirov, a sequel to The Frog Princess (2025), based on the Russian fairy tale The Frog Princess. The script for the film was written by Vasiliy Rovenskiy and Olga Klemeshevo. Maksim Rogalskiy, Vasiliy Rovenskiy, Ekaterina Shavlova, Aleksandr Novikov, and Marina Popova were producers. The film's cinematographer was Arseny Kozin. The soundtrack for the film was written by Anton Gryzlov. It stars Valentina Lyapina, Aleksandr Metyolkin, and Nikita Kologrivyy.

This film was theatrically released on March 5, 2026.

== Cast ==
- Valentina Lyapina as Vasilisa
- Aleksandr Metyolkin as Ivan
- Nikita Kologrivyy as Koshchey
- Alisa Rudenko as Varya
- Roman Kurtsyn as Lyagush
- Svetlana Permyakova as Yaginya
- Zhanna Markevich
- Viktor Loginov
- Yelena Ksenofontova
- Kirill Batishta

== Production ==
=== Filming ===
Filming took place in the Leningrad Oblast and Saint Petersburg.
