= Valentina Lyapina =

Russian film actress

- Валентина Ляпина
- Born: Valentina Vladislavovna Lyapina; June 14, 2002 (age 24); Moscow, Russia
- Education: GITIS
- Occupations: Actress; model; dancer
- Years active: 2009–present

Valentina Vladislavovna Lyapina (Russian: Валентина Владиславовна Ляпина; born June 14, 2002) is a Russian television actress and model. She was a child actress.

== Early life and education ==
Lyapina was born in Moscow. Since childhood, the girl attended a modeling school, participated in fashion shows, commercials and photo shoots for famous glossy magazines Vogue and Elle. For a long time, she studied at the BRF modern dance school.

Since 2014, she acted at the Hermitage Theatre. In 2020, she began her studies at the Russian Institute of Theatre Arts, however in 2021 she switched to the Institute of Contemporary Art in Moscow.

== Acting career ==
Her first acting was in a TV program Before Court (До суда).

She began acting in films and TV series at the age of 9. The girl's first appearance in a film was the character of red-haired Tasya Baryshnikova, Lesha Baryshnikov's sister, in the 4th season of the youth mystical series Closed School.

Her first role in full feature film was in the comedy Young Man.

== Filmography ==
As of 2024, Lyapina's filmography included 63 projects.

Year	Title	Original Title	Role	Notes
2010	Before Court	До суда	episode	TV
2012	Closed School	Закрытая школа	Tasya Baryshnikova	4th season, TV series
2012	Girl in a decent family	Девушка в приличную семью	Masha	
2012		ru:У Бога свои планы		
2014		На крыльях	Masha in childhood	
2014		Отец Матвей	Olya	TV series
2015	Yeralash			(humorous shorts for children), issue no. 300, episode Селфи as selfie-girl
2016		Чужая дочь		TV series
2016		Воронины		TV sitcom series
2016		Челночницы		TV series
2019	Dear Dad	Дорогой папа	Alina Dyumina	
2020	Fate of Saboteur	Судьба диверсанта	Tanya	
2020	Peace! Love! Chewing Gum!	Мир! Дружба! Жвачка!	Evgenia "Zhenya" Gachina	TV series
2021	Girls Got Game	Нефутбол	Ekaterina "Katya" Panova	
2021	Family Budget	Семейный бюджет	Ksenia "Ksyusha" Frolova	
2022	Young Man	Молодой человек	Nastya	
2023	I Want! I Will!	Я хочу! Я буду!	Alyona	
2024	Youth	Юность	Vilka	TV series
2024	The Bremen Town Musicians	Бременские музыканты	the Princess	
2025	The Frog Princess	Царевна-Лягушка	Vasilisa	
2026	The Frog Princess 2	Царевна-лягушка 2	Vasilisa	
