= Alyona Apina =

Soviet and Russian actress, singer

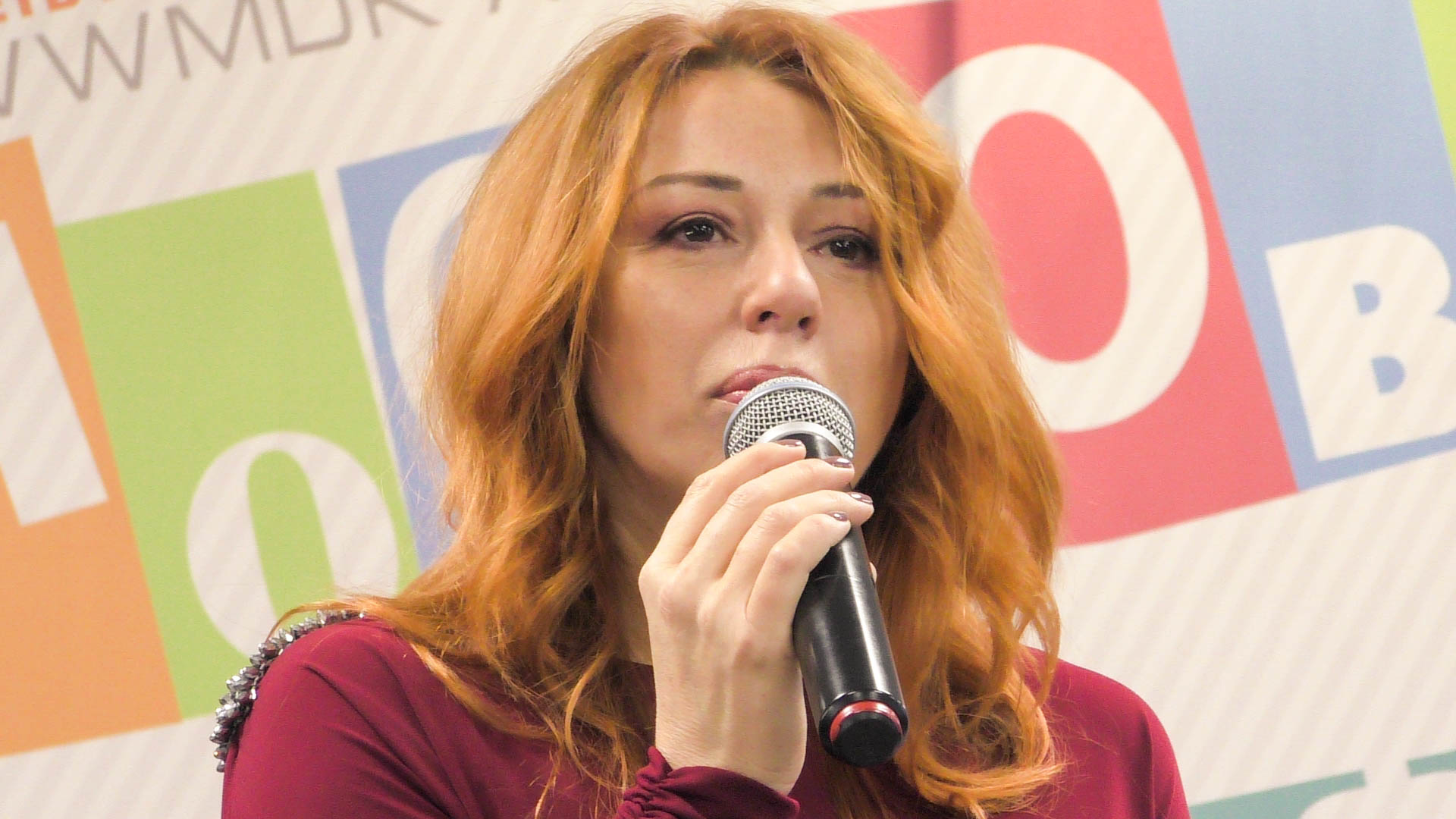

Background information
- Born: Elena Levochkina; August 23, 1964 (age 61); Saratov, Russian SSR, Soviet Union (present day Russia)
- Genres: Music of the Soviet Union, Folk music, Russian music, Pop, Disco, Chanson
- Occupations: Singer, actress, poet
- Instrument: Piano
- Years active: 1988–present
- Formerly of: Kombinaciya
- Website: http://www.alena-apina.ru

Alyona Apina (Еле́на Евге́ньевна А́пина; maiden name — Levochkina) is a Soviet and Russian singer, musical performer, actress and songwriter. Her career started in 1988 and continues to this day. For her unique tone of voice and "peculiar Apina's folk style, which she studied at the Faculty of Folk Song at the Saratov Conservatory", she has become one of the most popular Russian musical performers across the former Soviet Union and Honored Artist of the Russian Federation (2002)

== Biography ==
Alyona was born on August 23, 1964, in the City of Saratov. When she was 5 years old, her parents enrolled her to a local music school in the piano class. She successfully graduated from music school and attended music college. After she graduated from college, she enrolled to the Folk Song Faculty of the Saratov State Conservatory.

=== 1988—1991 ===
While studying at the Conservatory, Alyona was invited by a friend to the summer vacation to make some extra money as a singer in a band, and in 1988–1991, she was the lead singer of Russian female band Kombinaciya. The band's popularity peaked between 1989 and 1993, with major hits such as "Russian Girls", "American Boy", "Accountant" (Бухгалтер), and "Two Slices of Sausage" (Два кусочека колбаски). In 1991 Alyona Apina left the band to pursue a successful career as a solo performer. Her first solo song "Xenia" became an instant hit. In 1992, she released her first solo album 'Street of Love', but her second album "Dance until the morning" is considered to be the most successful. All eight songs from this album have become popular hits that all Russians knew and sang. In 1994 for the first time in history of Russian pop/folk music Apina produced a musical pop-novel "Limit". The songs for the musical were composed by the renowned Russian poet Mikhail Tanich. The musical "Limit" was very successful and had a full house for 5 days in Moscow and 5 days in St. Petersburg. It was broadcast on the main TV channels of the country.

=== 1991—2000 ===
Alyona Apina was a popular singer in the 90s and produced several albums during that time; her music videos were regularly filmed and broadcast on main TV channels. In 1998, Alyona Apina received the prestigious Russian music award "Ovation" as the "Best singer of the year". In 1999 she was invited to the Russian TV channel TV Tsentr as a host of the popular musical TV show "Polevaya pochta". She continued her singing career and toured in Germany, Israel, France, Ireland and many other European countries. As an actress she was involved in many TV projects, including the popular television series "Old Songs of the Main Things" (Старые песни о главном), "Christmas meetings" (Рождественские встречи) with Alla Pugacheva, "Urgent" and many others.

=== 2001–present ===
In 2001 she gave a birth to a daughter Ksenia. In 2002 Alena Apina has become a Honored Artist of the Russian Federation. She continues to participate in various TV projects, music festivals and in other events. In 2013 Apina launched a daytime talk show "International with Alyona Apina" (Интернационал с Алёной Апиной). Together with famous guests, she airs and discusses the songs of unknown Russian artists who posted their work on the Internet.

In 2024 she appeared in the TV series Kombinaciya about the girl group.

== Awards and achievements ==
- Honored Artist of the Russian Federation (2002);
- Cavalier of the Order of "Service to Art" International Charity Fund "Patrons of the Century" (2007)
- Medal of the Governor of Moscow Region for the achievements in the field of culture and charity events (2012)

== Discography ==
=== with Kombinaciya ===
See Kombinaciya discography

=== Albums Solo ===
Year	Title	Note
1992	"Улица любви" ("Ulitsa lyubvi"; "Street love")	
1993	"Танцевать до утра" ("Tantsevat' do utra"; "Dance until the morning")	also known as "Всё не так просто" ("Vso ne tak prosto"; "It's not so simple")
1994	"Пляжный сезон" ("Plyazhnyy sezon"; "Beach season")	
1995	"Лимита" ("Limita"; "Limits")	
1995	" Пропащая душа" ("Propashchaya dusha"; "The missing soul")	
1996	"Соперница" ("Sopernitsa"; "The rival")	
1997	"Объяснение в любви" ("Ob"yasneniye v lyubvi"; "Explanation for love")	
1998	"Люби как я" ("Lyubi kak ya"; "Love me like I do")	
1999	"Тополя" ("Topolya"; "Poplars")	
2001	"О судьбе и о себе" ("O sud'be i o sebe"; "About destiny and about yourself")	
2003	"Пойдем со мной. Энергетическая" ("Poydem so mnoy. Energeticheskaya"; "Come with me. Energy")	double-album
2003	"Пойдем со мной. Лирическая" ("Poydem so mnoy. Liricheskaya"; "Come with me. Lyrical")	double-album
2007	"Самолет на Москву" ("Samolet na Moskvu"; "Airplane to Moscow")	
2010	"Ещё раз про любовь" ("Yeshcho raz pro lyubov'"; "Once again about love")	
2014	"Мелодия" ("Melodiya"; "Melody")	
2016	"Alena Apina"	
2018	"Давай так" ("Davay tak"; "Come on like this")	

=== Compilation albums ===
Year	Title	Note
1993	"Алёна Апина" ("Alyona Apina")	
1994	"До и после" ("Do i posle"; "Before and after")	
1995	"Музыка для дискотек" ("Muzyka dlya diskotek"; "Music for dico")	
1997	"Избранное" ("Izbrannoye"; "My Favorites")	
1998	"The Best"	
2001	"Ты мне не снишься" ("Ty mne ne snish'sya"; "You do not dream of me")	
2004	"Любовное настроение" ("Lyubovnoye nastroyeniye"; "Mood for love")	

=== Videography ===
Year	Music Video	Director	Album
1991	"Бухгалтер" ("Bukhgalter"; "Accountant")	Сергей Косач (Sergey Kosach)	Улица любви
1992	"Ксюша" ("Ksyusha")	—N/a	Улица любви
1992	"Улица любви" ("Ulitsa lyubvi"; "Street love")	Сергей Косач (Sergey Kosach)	Улица любви
1993	"Лёха" ("Liocha"; "Lech")	Filipp Yankovsky	Танцевать до утра
1993	"Летучий голландец" ("Letuchiy gollandets"; "Flying Dutchman")	Борис Деденев (Boris Dedenev)	Танцевать до утра
1993	"Я тебя у всех украду" ("YA tebya u vsekh ukradu"; "I'll steal from you all")	Борис Деденев (Boris Dedenev)	Танцевать до утра
1993	"Ив Сен-Лоран" ("Iv Sen-Loran"; "Yves Saint Laurent")	—N/a	Танцевать до утра
1994	"Самоубийца" ("Samoubiytsa"; "Suicide")	Сергей Кальварский (Sergey Kalvarsky)	Пляжный сезон
1995	"Узелки" ("Uzelki"; "Nodules")	Даниил Мишин (Daniil Mishin)	Лимита
1995	"Семечек стакан" ("Semechek stakan"; "Sunflower seeds")	Сергей Косач (Sergey Kosach)	Пропащая душа
1995	"Вот кто-то с горочки спустился (feat. Natasha Korolyova e Lada Dance)" ("Vot kto-to s gorochki spustilsya"; "Here someone went down from the pea")	Дмитрий Фикс (Dmitriy Fiks)	Старые песни о главном Soundtrack ("Staryye pesni o glavnom"; "Old songs about the main")
1996	"Несколько часов любви (feat. Андрей Державин)" ("Neskol'ko chasov lyubvi"; "A few hours of love"; with Andrey Derzhavin)	Даниил Мишин (Daniil Mishin)	Соперница
1996	"Соперница" ("Sopernitsa"; "The rival")	Сергей Изотов (Sergey Izotov)	Соперница
1996	"Пароходик" ("Parokhodik"; "Steamer")	Даниил Мишин (Daniil Mishin)	Объяснение в любви
1996	"Ромашки спрятались(feat. Natasha Korolyova e Tatiana Bulanova)" ("Romashki spryatalis'"; "Camomiles hid")	Dzhanik Fayziev	Старые песни о главном 2 Soundtrack ("Staryye pesni o glavnom 2"; "Old songs about the main 2")
1997	"Электричка" ("Elektrichka"; "Train")	Андрей Лукашевич (Andrey Lukashevich)	Объяснение в любви
1997	"Александра, Александра" ("Aleksandra, Aleksandra")	Dzhanik Fayziev	Десять песен о Москве
1997	"Лунные ночи (feat. Murat Nasyrov)" ("Lunnyye nochi"; "Moonlit nights")	Даниил Мишин (Daniil Mishin)	Моя история ("Moya istoriya; "My history"; Murat Nasyrov's album)
1997	"Стою на полустаночке" ("Stoyu na polustanochke"; "I'm standing on polustanochke")	Vasili Pichul	Старые песни о главном 3 Soundtrack ("Staryye pesni o glavnom 3"; "Old songs about the main 3")
1998	"Люби его" ("Lyubi yego"; "Love him")	Сергей Косач (Sergey Kosach)	Люби, как я
1998	"Москвичи" ("Moskvichi"; "Muscovites")	Даниил Мишин (Daniil Mishin)	Люби, как я
1999	"Тополя" ("Topolya"; "Poplars")	Андрей Лукашевич (Andrey Lukashevich)	Тополя
1999	"Убегу от тебя" ("Ubegu ot tebya"; "Run away from you")	Даниил Мишин (Daniil Mishin)	Тополя
2000	"Сенсация" ("Sensatsiya"; "Sensation")	Сергей Баженов (Sergey Bazhenov)	Тополя
2000	"Песня о женской дружбе (feat. Lolita)" ("Pesnya o zhenskoy druzhbe"; "Song about female friendship")	Сергей Баженов (Sergey Bazhenov)	О судьбе и о себе
2000	"Дорогая рука" ("Dorogaya ruka"; "Expensive Hand")	Сергей Кальварский (Sergey Kalvarsky)	О судьбе и о себе
2001	"Завтра" ("Zavtra"; "Tomorrow")	Сергей Кальварский (Sergey Kalvarsky)	О судьбе и о себе
2002	"Она любила вишни" ("Ona lyubila vishni"; "She loved cherries")	Андрей Ивлев, Василий Ивлев (Andrey Ivlev, Vasiliy Ivlev)	Пойдём со мной. Энергетическая
2002	"Грешный миг (feat. Boris Moiseev)" ("Moskvichi"; "Muscovites")	Андрей Ивлев, Василий Ивлев (Andrey Ivlev, Vasiliy Ivlev)	Пойдём со мной. Лирическая
2003	"Электричка 2" ("Elektrichka 2"; "Train 2")	Андрей Ивлев, Василий Ивлев (Andrey Ivlev, Vasiliy Ivlev)	Пойдём со мной. Энергетическая
2003	"Я танцую без тебя" ("YA tantsuyu bez tebya"; "I'm dancing without you")	—N/a	Пойдём со мной. Лирическая
2004	"Белые ночи" ("Belyye nochi"; "White Nights")	Ирина Миронова (Irina Mironova)	Самолёт на Москву
2006	"Самолёт на Москву" ("Samolot na Moskvu"; "Airplane to Moscou")	Даниил Мишин (Daniil Mishin)	Самолёт на Москву
2013	"С новым годом, бухгалтер" ("S novym godom, bukhgalter"; "Happy New Year, accountant")	Юрий Волев (Yuri Volev)	—N/a
2014	"Мелодия" ("Melodiya"; "Melody")	Евгений Горман (Yevgeniy Gorman)	Alena Apina
2015	"Ди-Джей" ("Di-Dzhey"; "DJ")	Евгений Горман (Yevgeniy Gorman)	Alena Apina
2017	"Близость" ("Blizost'"; "Intimacy")	Аслан Ахмадов (Aslan Ahmadov)	Давай так
2017	"Девушка Бонда" ("Devushka Bonda"; "Bond Girl")	Аслан Ахмадов (Aslan Ahmadov)	Давай так
