= Saving Pushkin =

- Directed by: Igor Ugolnikov (ru)
- Written by: Yevgeny Ayzikovich; Igor Ugolnikov; Natalya Nazarova
- Produced by: Igor Ugolnikov; Pavel Smirnov; Eduard Pichugin; Bagrat Chelabyan; Elena Belkova; Yevgeny Ayzikovich
- Starring: Sergey Bezrukov; Nastassja Kerbengen; Fyodor Bondarchuk; Igor Ugolnikov; Anastasiya Melnikova; Mikhael Epp; Anastasiya Butkova; Aleksey Nesterov
- Cinematography: Andrey Gurkin
- Music by: Sergey Shustitsky
- Production companies: VoenFilm; Corner Work; Lenfilm
- Distributed by: Sony Pictures Productions and Releasing
- Release date: October 21, 2021
- Running time: 160 minutes
- Country: Russia
- Language: Russian
- Budget: ₽209 million
- Box office: ₽3 million

Saving Pushkin, also known as Saving Legacy (Russian: Учёности плоды, romanized: Uchyonosti plody) is a 2021 Russian war drama film directed by Igor Ugolnikov. The main roles were played by Sergey Bezrukov and Nastassja Kerbengen.

It was released on October 21, 2021 by Sony Pictures Productions and Releasing (SPPR).

== Plot ==
The film is set in 1944 at the Mikhaylovskoye Museum Reserve in the village of Mikhailovskoye. Some local residents have joined the partisans, while others have chosen to cooperate with the invaders. Left-handed Sergey remains neutral, deciding to simply wait and see how events unfold. Suddenly, a literature professor named Maria Schiller arrives from Germany. She begins to share stories about Alexander Pushkin with the Wehrmacht soldiers and the local residents. Meanwhile, an order comes from Berlin to remove all historical valuables from the village.

== Cast ==
- Sergey Bezrukov as Sergey Trofimov, rural left-hander
- Nastassja Kerbengen as Frau Maria Schiller
- Fyodor Bondarchuk as Bespalov, the commander of the partisan detachment
- Igor Ugolnikov as Antipov, museum employee
- Anastasiya Melnikova as Lyudmila Antipova, Antipov's wife
- Mikhael Epp as Major Zangler
- Anastasiya Butkova as Anisya, a resident of the village
- Aleksey Nesterov as Amel
- Igor Savochkin as Yegor, partisan
- Dmitry Solomykin as Zangler's adjutant
- Konstantin Fisenko as Dyoma, partisan
- Andrey Gorbachev as Yupatov
- Andrey Nekrasov as Voronin

== Production ==
The distribution of Ugolnikov's picture is handled by the Russian film company Sony Pictures Productions and Releasing (SPPR), which has released films such as Petrov's Flu on the big screens.

== Filming ==
Principal photography took place in 2019 on the territory of Pushkinskiye Gory. The authorities of the Pskov Oblast provided direct assistance in choosing locations for the film.
