= One Particular Pioneer =

- Film poster
- Russian: Частное пионерское
- Directed by: Aleksandr Karpilovsky
- Written by: Aleksey Borodachyov; Aleksandr Karpilovsky; Tatyana Miroshnik
- Produced by: Vladimir Esinov
- Starring: Semyon Treskunov; Egor Klinaev; Anfisa Vistingauzen; Yuliya Rutberg; Svetlana Ivanova
- Cinematography: Mikhail Milashin
- Edited by: Irina Bychkova
- Music by: Maksim Koshevarov; Sergey Zykov
- Production company: KinoProgramma XXI
- Release date: October 16, 2013
- Running time: 80 min.
- Country: Russia
- Language: Russian

One Particular Pioneer (Russian: Частное пионерское, romanized: Chastnoe pionerskoe) is a 2013 Russian comedy film directed by Aleksandr Karpilovsky.

== Plot ==
The film tells the story of two boys, Misha and Dima, who are preparing for the birthday of a pioneer organization. While fishing, Misha falls into the river, but is saved by a stray dog, Savva, who after that was taken by a furrier. Only the two boys can save her. They have to make a difficult choice. They miss a school holiday. Misha and Dima tried to save Savva, by any means, risking jail. They secretly swam to the illegal shelter of the keeper, who is revealed to be a dangerous criminal. The boys save Savva and 10 other dogs. Later on, Misha's father regrets his actions and Misha tells him that he had learned to swim. Vadim Mikhaylovich agreed to keep the dog. Finally, when the school engages in discussion about whether Mishka and Dima should be suspended, a police officer came to school with congratulations for discovering and helping to liquidate a dangerous criminal.

== Cast ==
- Semyon Treskunov as Mishka Khrustalev
- Egor Klinaev as Dimka Terentyev
- Anfisa Vistingauzen as Lenka Karaseva
- Yuliya Rutberg as Nadezhda Vladimirovna
- Svetlana Ivanova as Svetlana Alekseevna
- Roman Madyanov as Keeper
- Yevgeny Mundum as Vitya Mukhomor
- Raisa Ryazanova as Galina Ivanovna
- Vladimir Zaytsev as Vadim Mikhaylovich Khrustalev
- Irina Lindt as Mishka's mother
- Ekaterina Durova as postwoman
