= Russkiy Reyd =

Russkiy Reyd Russian Raid
- Directed by: Denis Kryuchkov
- Written by: Denis Kryuchkov; Olga Loyanich; Robert Orr
- Produced by: Alexander Kalushkin; Denis Kryuchkov; Sofia Kvashilava; Olga Loyanich; Andrey Lyakhov
- Starring: Ivan Kotik; Alexandr Krasovsky; Ilya Antonenko; Vladimir Mineev; Nikita Kologrivyy; Sofya Ozerova; Kirill Sarychev; Dmitry Krivochurov; Andrei Semenov
- Cinematography: Alexey Sedov
- Edited by: Georgy Isaakyan
- Music by: Igor Gotsmanov
- Production companies: OKKO Studios; Radragon; SSB Films
- Distributed by: Central Partnership
- Release date: October 1, 2020 (Russia)
- Running time: 103 minutes
- Country: Russia
- Language: Russian

Russkiy Reyd (also in English territories as Russian Raid) (Russian: Русский рейд, romanized: Russkiy reyd) is a 2020 Russian action thriller film directed by Denis Kryuchkov. It stars Ivan Kotik, Alexandr Krasovsky, Ilya Antonenko, Vladimir Mineev, Nikita Kologrivyy, Sofya Ozerova, Kirill Sarychev, Dmitry Krivochurov and Andrei Semenov.

The film was theatrically released in Russia on 1 October 2020.

== Premise ==
Nikita is a former Russian Spetsnaz operative, who is hired to neutralize the large private security force at a local factory so that his shady employer can extort the business from the factory owner, but Nikita and his group of highly trained fighters get more than they bargained when it turns out the factory is actually owned by a dangerous warlord connected to the Russian military. By the time the "hostile takeover" is complete, Nikita reveals that he has orchestrated his own secret mission to exact vengeance on the most dangerous person in Russia.

== Cast ==
- Ivan Kotik as Nikita
- Alexandr Krasovsky
- Ilya Antonenko
- Vladimir Mineev
- Nikita Kologrivyy
- Sofya Ozerova as Eva
- Kirill Sarychev
- Dmitry Krivochurov
- Andrei Semenov
