= Kombinaciya =

Russian girl group

Kombinaciya (Комбинация)
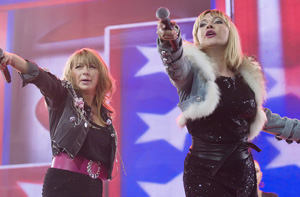

Background information
- Also known as: Kombinacia, Kombinatsia, Kombinatsiya
- Origin: Saratov, Soviet Union
- Genres: Russian chanson; Disco
- Years active: 1988 – present
- Label: Gala
- Members: Tatyana Ivanova; Ekaterina Bolotova; Alena Antonova; Natalya Pushkareva; Lilia Tereshchenko
- Past members: Alena Apina, Svetlana Kashina
- Website: http://www.kombinaciya.com

Kombinaciya (Russian: Комбинация) is a Soviet and Russian female pop band. The name means "combination," but the Russian word is a double entendre which also refers to a woman's frilly slip, and at the group's 1988 performance in Moscow they were forced to perform under a different name because "Kombinaciya" was considered too suggestive a band title. As former band member Svetlana Kostyko recalled: "A group with this name just had to make a sensation." ("группа с таким названием просто должна была произвести фурор.").

== History ==
Kombinaciya was co-founded in 1988 by manager/producer Alexander Shishinin (Александр Шишинин) and classically trained composer Vitali Okorokov (Виталий Окороков) in Saratov, Russia. Shishinin, who reportedly was inspired after viewing a performance of Mirage, recruited six local girls, ages 16 to 20, to form the band. Lead vocalist Alena Apina (Алёна Апина) had trained at the Saratov State Conservatory. The other original members of the group were vocalist Tatiana Ivanova (Татьяна Иванова), keyboardist Svetlana Kostyko (Светлана Костыко), guitarist Tanya Dolganova (Таня Долганова), bass guitarist Olga Akhunova (Ольга Ахунова) and drummer Julia Kozyulkova (Юлия Козюлькова). The group underwent various membership changes over the years, with only Tatiana Ivanova continually remaining in the group since its founding. Later band members included Inessa Topiani (Инесса Топиани), Nura Kovaleva (Нюра Ковалева), Svetlana Kashina (Светлана Кашина), Elena Molchanova (Елена Молчанова), Galya Lezina (Гала Лезина), Svetlana Molchanova (Светлана Молчанова), Katerina Bolotova (Катерина Болотова) and Natalia Pushkareva (Наталья Пушкарева).

Lead singer Alena Apina later recalled Kombinaciya's first major concert, which took place on the big stage of the Sports Palace in Volgograd. "When you come out and feel all the tremendous energy of the seven thousand people. It's an indescribable feeling." ("Когда ты выходишь и чувствуешь всю огромную энергию этих семи тысяч человек. Это непередаваемое ощущение.")

In 1990 the group performed two songs in the Soviet film Mordashka.

The band's popularity peaked between 1989 and 1993, with major hits such as "Russian Girls", "American Boy", "Accountant" (Бухгалтер), and "Two Slices of Sausage" (Два кусочека колбаски). The latter was a Russian drinking song initially disliked by the group. As former vocalist Svetlana Kashina recalled later, "It was a huge success at the concerts; the fans were chanting: 'Sausage! Sausage!' ...We had to sing it. After each time, I spat." ("Она имела бешеный успех, на концертах поклонники скандировали: 'Колбасу! Колбасу!'...пришлось ее петь. Каждый раз плевались после нее.") "Accountant", about a woman's love for a simple Russian accountant, seems to have been Kombinaciya's most enduring popular song.

A major setback to the group occurred in 1991, when lead vocalist Alena Apina left the band to pursue a successful career as a solo performer. Negotiations were being finalized for Kombinaciya to produce an English album and embark on a tour of America, but with Apina's departure from the group those plans were dropped.

Another big setback to the group occurred on March 5, 1993, when manager/producer Alexander Shishinin was murdered, a still-unsolved crime that was rumored to be linked to Russian Mafia influence in the music industry. Without Shishinin's guidance, the band's subsequent new material had limited success, but Kombinaciya continued to intermittently tour using the enduring popularity of its earlier big hits. In 2008, Alena Apina and Tatiana Ivanova reunited for several Kombinaciya 20th anniversary reunion concerts.

In 2007, Tatiana Ivanova successfully sued the music distributor Boomba Music for copyright infringement, after the company reissued Kombinaciya albums without paying royalties.

In the 2021 action film Nobody, the song Accountant (Бухгалтер) is used during the presentation of Aleksei Serebryakov's character, Yulian, while he dances to it and breaks into song in a nightclub full of Russians.

In 2024 Russian streaming media service Wink broadcast the dramatized biographical series Kombinaciya based on the group's early history.

== "American Boy" ==
"American Boy" was one of Kombinaciya's major hit songs, released in 1990 when the Soviet Union was dissolving and most Russians were experiencing deteriorating living conditions. The song, about an unhappy Russian girl wishing that an American Boy would take her away with him and leave Russia behind, captured public sentiment at that pivotal time in Russian history. The song was mentioned in mainstream American newspapers. Later, scholarly books and journal articles discussed cultural aspects of the song's viewpoint. The verses of the song are in Russian, but the title and portions of the chorus are in English. A 2008 remake by Ukrainian electropop group Stream was sung with English verses. The song captured public attention in 2011 after Russian president Dmitry Medvedev was recorded dancing to it at a university reunion.

== Album discography ==
=== Studio albums ===
Title	Album details
Knight Move (Ход конём; Khod konom)	Released: 1988 (URSS); Formats: MC
The White Evening (Белый вечер; Belyy vecher)	Released: 1988 (URSS); Formats: MC
Russian Girls (Русские девочки; Russkiye devoshki)	Released: 1988 (URSS); Formats: MC
Show-group "Combination" (Шоу-группа «Комбинация»; Shou-gruppa «Kombinatsiya»)	Released: 1989 (URSS); Label: Melodiya; Formats: EP
Russian Girls. A New Version (Русские девочки. Новая версия; Russkiye devochki. Novaya versiya)	Released: 1989 (URSS); Re-released: 1990; Label: Gala Records, Melodiya; Formats: MC, LP
Moscow Residence Permit (Московская прописка; Moskovskaya propiska)	Released: 1991 (URSS); Label: Gala Records; Formats: LP, MC
Two Slices of Sausage (Два кусочека колбаски; Dva kusocheka kolbaski): also known as Dva kusocheka kolbaski ot khoroshikh devochek (Два кусочека колбаски от хороших девочек; Two pieces of sausages from good girls)	Released: 1993 (RU); Label: Gala Records, SBA; Formats: CD, LP, MC
The Best, The Best... (Самая, самая...; Samaya, samaya...)	Released: 1994 (RU); Label: Союз, Бекар; Formats: CD, MC
Let's Talk (Давай поболтаем; Davay poboltayem)	Released: 1998 (RU); Label: JAM; Formats: CD, MC

=== Compilations ===
Title	Album details
Combination" and others. Best songs of Vitaliy Okorokov (Комбинация» и другие. Лучшие песни Виталия Окорокова; «Kombinatsiya» i drugiye. Luchshiye pesni Vitaliya Okorokova)	Released: 1992 (RU); Label: AO ЛАДЪ; Formats: LP
From early. Songs of the composer Vitaliy Okorokov (Из раннего. Песни композитора Виталия Окорокова; Iz rannego. Pesni kompozitora Vitaliya Okorokova)	Released: 1994 (RU); Label: MTM; Formats: CD
The Very Best Of…	Released: 1994 (RU); Label: Gala Records; Formats: CD
Music for discos (remixes) (Музыка для дискотек (ремиксы); Muzyka dlya diskotek (remiksy))	Released: 1995 (RU); Label: MEDIA STAR; Formats: CD, MC
Legendary songs (Легендарные песни; Legendarnyye pesni)	Released: 2004 (RU); Label: JAM; Formats: CD, MC
MP3 Jam Collection	Released: 2005 (RU); Label: JAM; Formats: MP3-CD

=== Reissues ===
Title	Album details
Moscow Residence Permit (Московская прописка; Moskovskaya propiska)	Released: 1994 (RU); Label: Gala Records, SBA; Formats: CD
White evening (copy of the disk "From early") (Белый вечер (копия диска «Из раннего»); Belyy vecher (kopiya diska «Iz rannego»)	Released: 2004 (RU); Label: JAM; Formats: CD, MC
Russian girls (Русские девочки; Russkiye devochki)	Released: 2004 (RU); Label: JAM; Formats: CD, MC
Moscow Residence Permit (Московская прописка; Moskovskaya propiska)	Released: 2004 (RU); Label: MEDIA STAR; Formats: CD, MC
Two Slices of Sausage (Два кусочека колбаски; Dva kusocheka kolbaski)	Released: 2004 (RU); Label: JAM; Formats: CD, MC
The Best, The Best... (Самая, самая...; Samaya, samaya...)	Released: 2004 (RU); Label: JAM; Formats: CD, MC
