= Yuri Kuklachov =

Soviet and Russian clown

Yuri Kuklachyov
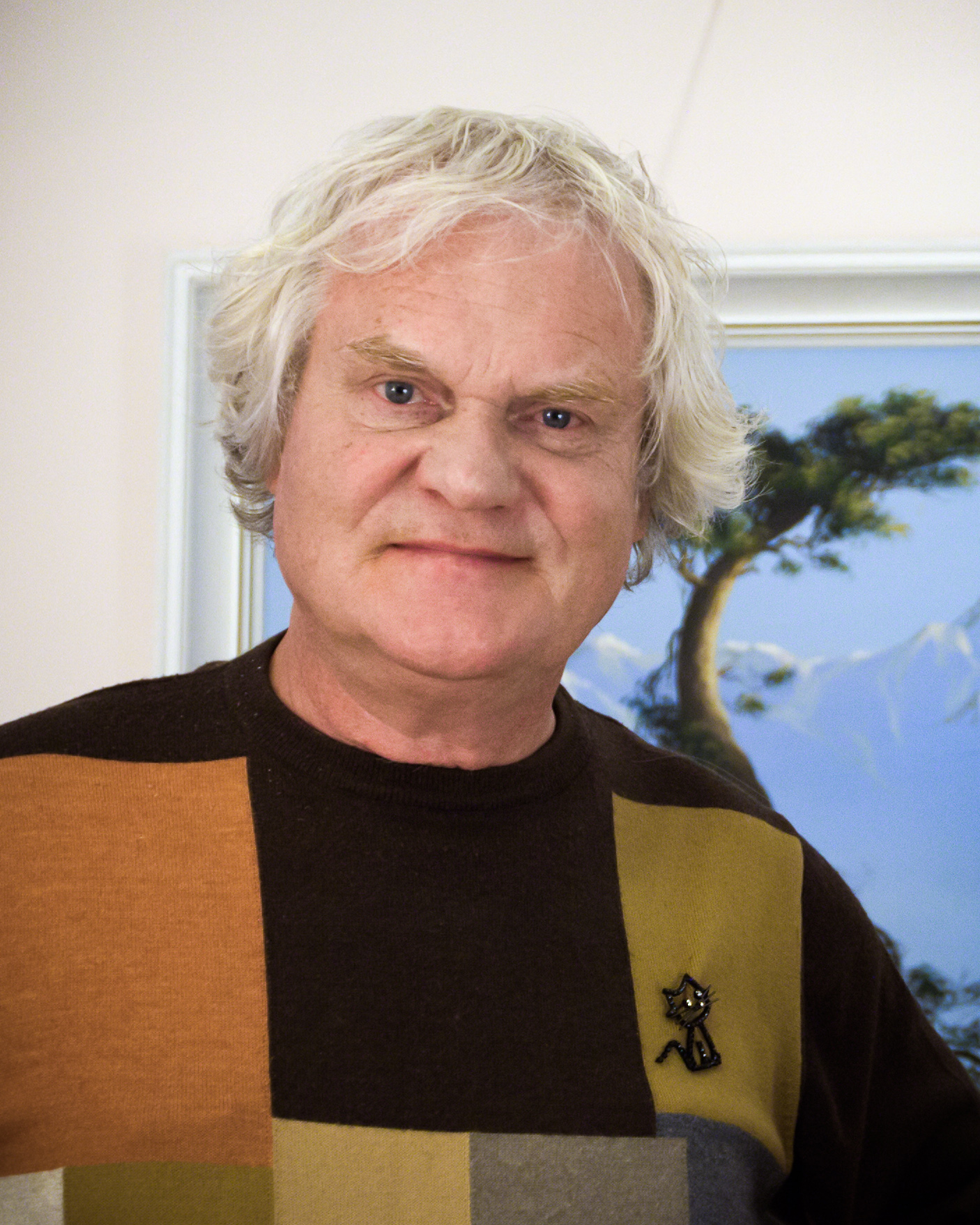
- Born: 12 April 1949 (age 77); Khimki
- Occupations: clown, mime, circus artist

Yuri Dmitrievich Kuklachyov (Russian: Ю́рий Дми́триевич Куклачёв; born 12 April 1949, in Khimki) is a Soviet and Russian clown who was awarded the title People’s Artist of the RSFSR (1986). He is known for his work with cats.
