= Bender: Gold of the Empire =

- Directed by: Igor Zaytsev
- Written by: Oleg Malovichko
- Produced by: Aleksandr Tsekalo; Ivan Samokhvalov; Varya Avdyushko; Aleksandra Remizova; Danila Ippolitov; Olga Nikulina
- Starring: Sergey Bezrukov; Aram Vardevanyan; Nikita Kologrivyy; Yuliya Makarova; Vera Brezhneva; Yuri Kolokolnikov; Pavel Derevyanko; Aleksandr Tsekalo; Yuliya Rutberg; Olga Sutulova
- Cinematography: Sergei Trofimov
- Edited by: Yekaterina Beresnevich
- Music by: Ryan Otter
- Production company: Sreda
- Distributed by: Central Partnership
- Release date: 15 July 2021
- Running time: 87 minutes
- Country: Russia
- Language: Russian

Bender: Gold of the Empire, also known as Ostap Bender Trilogy (Russian: Бендер: Золото империи) is a 2021 Russian action adventure comedy film directed by Igor Zaytsev, a sequel to the film Bender: The Beginning from the production company Sreda. It was theatrically released in Russia on 15 July 2021.

The film tells the story of how Ibrahim Bender and his student Ostap suddenly lose a precious treasure and it falls into the hands of Nestor Makhno, who is sure that there are other relics in the vicinity. As a result, reds, whites, bandits and partisans start hunting for gold.

== Plot ==
Set against the backdrop of the Russian Civil War in 1919 in the South of Russia, the film follows the pursuit of a missing imperial relic, the scepter of Pyotr Rumyantsev, which has disappeared during transportation. Lev Trotsky, Chairman of the Revolutionary Military Council, faces the risk of losing vital arms supplies unless the artifact is recovered. He tasks Grigory Kotovsky with finding and returning the scepter.

Simultaneously, the relic is sought by young adventurer Ostap Bender and his mentor, the seasoned con artist Ibrahim Bender. The scepter is hidden in the home of undertaker Mark Sagalovich, who plans to marry off his daughter, Sonya, to the notorious bandit Mishka Yaponchik against her will. Disguised as Orthodox Jews, Ostap and Ibrahim infiltrate the wedding to retrieve the artifact. However, their plan is thwarted when leftist anarchist Nestor Makhno crashes the wedding and steals the scepter.

Kotovsky, now allied with the bandit Tarasevich, captures Bender and Zadunaisky to use them as leverage to infiltrate Makhno's camp.

== Cast ==
- Sergey Bezrukov as Ibrahim Suleiman Berta-Maria Bender-Bey
- Aram Vardevanyan as Osip "Osya" Zadunaisky (Ostap Bender-Zadunaisky)
- Nikita Kologrivyy as Mishka Yaponchik
- Yuliya Makarova as Sofi Sokolovich
- Vera Brezhneva as Robber
- Yuri Kolokolnikov as Grigory Kotovsky
- Pavel Derevyanko as Nestor Makhno
- Aleksandr Tsekalo as Mark Sokolovich
- Yuliya Rutberg as Madame Sokolovich
- Olga Sutulova as Maria Zadunaiskaya, Osip Zadunaisky's mother
- Artyom Tkachenko as Staff captain Mishin-Ametistov

== Production ==
The film is slated to be merged with the prequel, Bender: The Beginning, and the sequel, Bender: The Final Hustle, to be released as a TV series.

== See also ==
- Bender: The Beginning – Part 1 (2021 film)
- Bender: The Final Hustle – Part 3 (2021 film)
