= Taganrog Iron & Steel Factory =

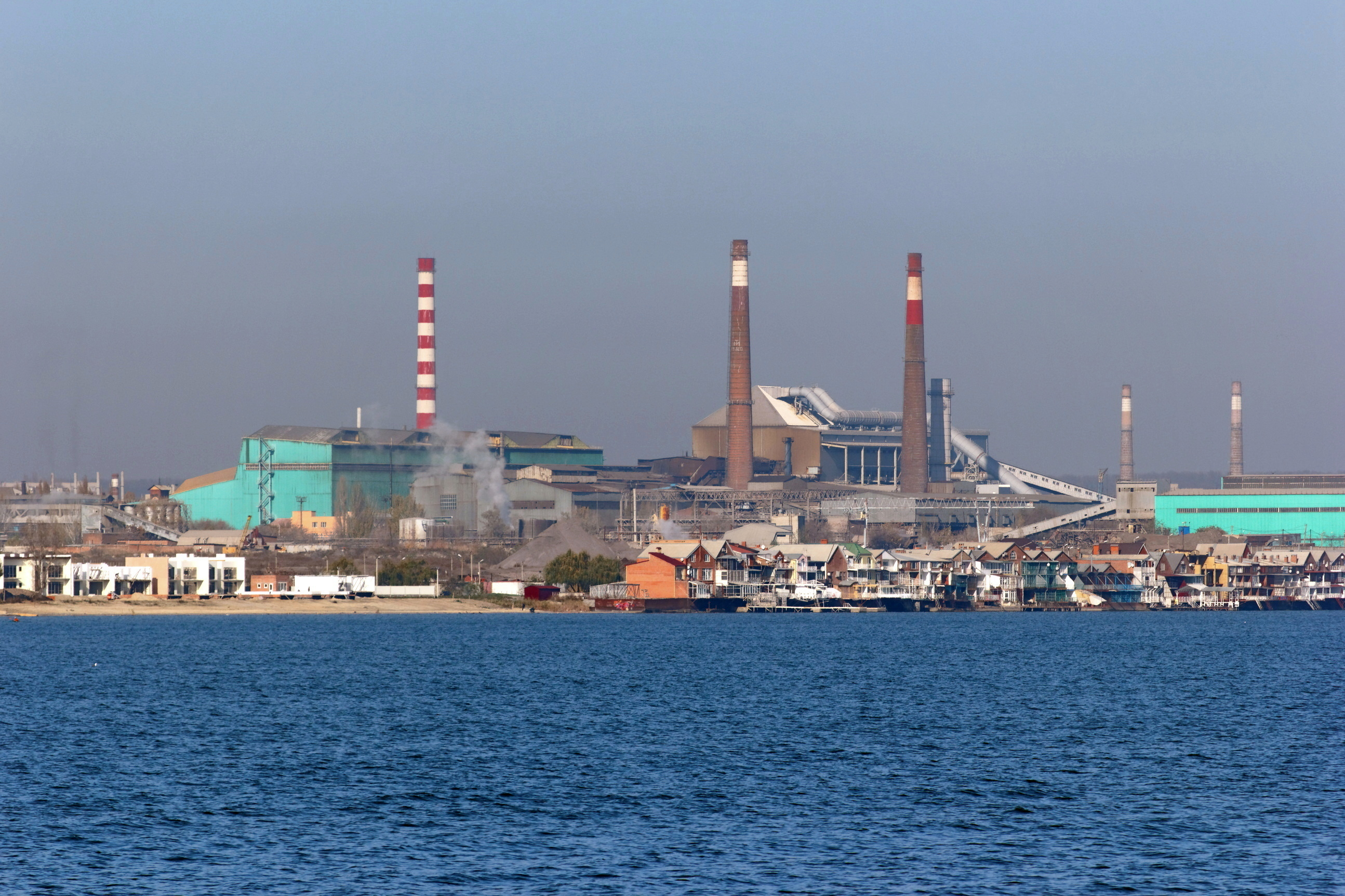
Taganrog Iron & Steel Factory, 2013

The Taganrog Iron & Steel Factory (TAGMET) is the largest manufacturer of steel pipes in the South of Russia. It was founded in 1896 as the Taganrog Metallurgical Company, a Russian-Belgian joint-stock company. The Azov-Don Commercial Bank, a Taganrog based commercial bank was instrumental in financing the original company, and Boris Kamenka of that bank was appointed to its board.

In 2002 Alfa-Eko increased its stake in TAGMET from 25% to 42% by acquiring when it acquired the interests of the Petrovsky Bank.

== History ==
The establishment of the metallurgical plant in Taganrog took place in 1896, following the establishment of the Russian-Belgian joint-stock company for this purpose. This venture was led by N.K. Flige, a titular adviser, and a group of Belgian individuals including Count P. de Gemptin, L. Trazenster, and Yu. B. Gerpeniy. The primary shareholder of the company was Albert Nev from Belgium. Albert Nev, who served as the chief manager of the Taganrog Metallurgical Society, informed the head of the South-Eastern Mining Department that the idea to construct a metallurgical plant originated from "a group of Belgian capitalists led by members of the Joint-Stock Metallurgical Company in Ougrée (Belgium), the French Society of Pipe Rolling Plants in Louvroil (France), and sheet rolling plants in Jupille-sur-Meuse (Belgium)...».

The old factory of the company "John Cockerill" in Liege, Belgium had its equipment dismantled and then transported to Taganrog. The construction process involved the participation of numerous peasants from the nearby areas, who settled in makeshift dwellings such as dugouts and mud huts around the factory. As a result, the residential areas of Scaramangovka and Solovki were established. Additionally, housing facilities were constructed in the Kolonka area specifically for engineers and managers.

On the momentous day of June 28, 1897, amidst an aura of grandeur and formality, the plant's official inauguration ceremony unfolded. By this juncture, the first blast furnace and open-hearth furnaces had been successfully ignited, while the sheet rolling shop had been meticulously readied for its imminent commencement of operations.

By 1898, the plant had already established a significant infrastructure, consisting of two blast furnaces, three open-hearth furnaces, three Thomas converters, a thick-sheet rolling mill, and a specialized mill for rolling high-quality iron.

In 1914, the plant was not only involved in manufacturing civilian goods but also expanded its production to include military items such as armor plates and shrapnel grenades.

During the pleasant season of spring in 1913, the Taganrog Metallurgical Society made an ambitious decision to acquire ownership of the Kerch Metallurgical Plant from its previous proprietors.

The plant underwent nationalization in 1918.

In 1922, there was a significant threat of closure looming over the Taganrog Metallurgical Plant. This dire situation was prompted by the decision made by the Yugostal Trust, the entity overseeing the plant, which deemed it incapable of being restored and deemed it unsuitable for any future operations. Consequently, the dismantling process of the plant's equipment had already commenced, putting the plant's very existence at risk. However, a stroke of luck occurred when Felix Dzerzhinsky, the Chairman of the Supreme Economic Council of the USSR, stepped in and intervened, effectively saving the plant from being liquidated.

Back in 1933, a new pipe rolling shop was established and inaugurated, with pilger mills that were manufactured by the German industrial conglomerate, Mannesmann.

During the time of occupation in 1941, the Wehrmacht unified armed forces inflicted extensive destruction upon the metallurgical plant, leaving it in ruins. However, on August 30, 1943, Taganrog finally regained its freedom from the Nazi occupiers. In November the first open-hearth shop, equipped with three furnaces, was successfully put into operation. This milestone was swiftly followed by the establishment of a band-rolling shop, signifying a significant step towards the restoration of the plant's full functionality.

The year 1957 marked a significant development for the plant as it started receiving gas supply from Stavropol. This new supply paved the way for the conversion of open-hearth furnaces into magnesite-chromite arches, which greatly improved the efficiency and functionality of the plant. Additionally, a steam-evaporative cooling system was implemented.

Fast forward to 1970, the plant management completed the construction of a seven-storey extension for their main office.

The growth and prosperity of the plant were further supported by the construction of a sports pavilion and a medical unit, providing recreational and healthcare facilities for the employees. The commencement of the construction for pipe welding shop No. 3 took place in the year 1960, and it was officially initiated in 1962.

== Recent Events ==
Taganrog Metallurgical Works (Tagmet) produced its five millionth ton of pipes in May 2020 on its continuous PQF® (Premium Quality Finishing) seamless pipe mill. This milestone batch of line pipes for the oil industry – of 168 millimeters diameter and 18 millimeters wall thickness - was produced using continuously cast billets.

In December 2024, unconfirmed reporting indicates Ukraine may have struck and damaged the Tagmet steel works using Storm Shadow or ATACMS guided missiles.

In March 2025, TAGMET announced they had rolled 7 million tons of pipes on their continuous pipe‑rolling mill since the start of that line. In November 2025, the company commissioned a new drill pipe straightening press for commercial operation. This upgrade enables faster preparation for drill pipe production by leveraging advanced manufacturing technology. The straightening press corrects potential deformations in drill pipes, including curvature, ensuring defect-free welding of tool joints.
