= An Hour Before Dawn (TV series) =

- Genre: Drama; Thriller; Detective; Crime
- Written by: Alexander Shcherbakov; Savva Minaev; Georgy Shabanov; Dmitry Novoselov
- Directed by: Igor Zaytsev
- Starring: Konstantin Khabensky; Andrey Burkovsky; Artur Smolyaninov; Maxim Belborodov; Artur Vakha; Alena Mikhailova; Agnia Ditkovskite; Valeria Wegner
- Theme music composer: Nikita Dolgachev
- Composer: Vadim Nekrasov
- Country of origin: Russia
- Original language: Russian
- No. of seasons: 1
- No. of episodes: 16

Production
- Executive producer: Ksenia Sokolova
- Producers: Alexey Zemsky (gen.); Timur Vainshtein (gen.); Vadim Ostrovsky (gen.); Fyodor Bondarchuk (gen.); Vyacheslav Murugov (gen.); Dmitry Tabarchuk (gen.); Georgy Shabanov (gen.); Vyacheslav Mikhailov; Sergey Maevsky; Yuri Miroshnichenko
- Cinematography: Eduard Moshkovich
- Editors: Kirill Araslanov; Pyotr Zelenov; Maria Sergeenkova
- Running time: 46 min.
- Production companies: Art Pictures Studio; Kino Company MIM

Original release
- Network: NTV; Pobeda, Wink, More.tv; KinoPoisk HD
- Release: 16 February – 11 May 2021

An Hour Before Dawn (Russian: За час до рассвета) is a 2021 Russian detective miniseries directed by Igor Zaytsev. The series stars Konstantin Khabensky, Andrey Burkovsky, and Artur Smolyaninov. Critics generally gave it mixed reviews.

== Plot ==
The series is set in 1946. The protagonist, Captain Denis Zhuravlyov, recently returned from the front, joins the police. His strict superior is Major Sergey Shumeyko. Zhuravlyov must capture the dangerous criminal Klesh, and it soon becomes clear that life is far more complex than wartime.

=== Episodes ===
#	Premiere	Summary
1 & 2	16.02.2021	Captain Denis Zhuravlyov returns from the front and joins the police. He must confront Klesh's gang. To find the gang leader, Zhuravlyov arranges a prison escape for Klesh's associate Kot, enlisting criminals Buyan and Graf. During an ambush on the prison transport, Kot is rescued but Buyan manages to injure him. Later, Zhuravlyov follows Kot and his partner Lyalka to a restaurant, but falls into an ambush and is severely beaten. Lyalka works as a nurse at the hospital where he recovers.
3 & 4	23.02.2021	Zhuravlyov escapes the hospital to follow Lyalka. He intervenes in a restaurant fight to protect Kot. Information emerges that Karas, head of Kot's gang, could lead them to Klesh. Karas lures Zhuravlyov to an abandoned warehouse filled with corpses. Police arrive, and Ministry of State Security officer Alexander Yartsev comes to the city.
5 & 6	02.03.2021	Klesh's gang tracks and tortures Kot to learn the safe house location. Kot discovers Zhuravlyov is a policeman but agrees to help capture Klesh. Major Shumeyko assigns additional investigators to support Zhuravlyov.
7 & 8	09.03.2021 & 16.03.2021	Buyan and Kot learn Klesh has hired a killer called Artist. Zhuravlyov realizes the assassin will target him and his team. Lyalka informs Zhuravlyov she saw Buyan with Shtepsel. Together they save Buyan. Zhuravlyov uses carrier pigeons to lure Klesh, but Artist kills Lyalka during the meeting.
9 & 10	23.03.2021 & 30.03.2021	Zhuravlyov tricks acquaintances into believing he is Klesh. The deception fails, prompting Buyan, Kot, and Graf to leave the gang. They visit a photo studio for passports and encounter Artist.
11 & 12	06.04.2021 & 13.04.2021	Using carrier pigeons, Zhuravlyov identifies Klesh as Levushka, a market fool. Zhuravlyov resumes work in the police with Yartsev. A woman named Sorokina reports seeing a former camp warden, Beast. Upon visiting her apartment, Zhuravlyov finds her hanged. Kot is framed for two murders as he tries to start a new life.
13 & 14	20.04.2021 & 27.04.2021	Zhuravlyov and Yartsev investigate the murders. Only one former camp worker, Antonov, remains alive. He reveals Beast's real name is Pokrovsky. During a confrontation with a photographer, Major Shumeyko uncovers a scorpion-shaped tattoo. Antonov is killed at the market under Zhuravlyov's watch, suggesting a traitor nearby.
15 & 16	04.05.2021 & 11.05.2021	During the opening of a new factory, an English ambassador is expected. Artist is hired to assassinate him. Zhuravlyov kills the assassin, but Klesh begins pursuing the ambassador.

== Cast ==
- Konstantin Khabensky — Major Sergey Shumeyko ("Satan")
- Andrey Burkovsky — Captain Denis Zhuravlyov ("Ptakha")
- Artur Smolyaninov — Dmitry Kopyrin ("Buyan")
- Maria Lisovaya — Marina, waitress
- Maxim Belborodov — Mikhail Tyagunov ("Kot")
- Artur Vakha — Ivan Ivanov / Platon Glebov ("Graf")
- Alena Mikhailova — Olga Smirnova
- Vladimir Zaytsev — Alexander Yartsev, state security officer
- Agnia Ditkovskite — Tatyana ("Lyalka"), nurse
- Valeria Wegner — Oksana Savchenko
- Alexandra Florinskaya — Elizaveta, brothel owner
- Maxim Bityukov — Yegor Prosvirin, photographer
- Vladimir Timofeev — Levushka, market fool
- Ivan Agapov — Lev Timokhin
- Evgeny Mundum — Viktor Antonov, former camp warden
- Alexander Rapoport — British ambassador
- Vyacheslav Grishechkin — Chief
- Artyom Bystrov — Andrey Savchenko
- Sergey Murzin — Chelpanov
- Maxim Konovalov — Karas, gangster
- Alexander Turavinin — "Shtepsel"
- Alexey Kirsanov — "Artist"
- Alexander Sokolovsky — "Olson"
- Gleb Bochkow — Andrey Lukov, state security officer
- Nikolay Machulsky — Vladimir Epifantsev, police officer from Moscow
- Alexey Ushakov — Korenev
- Vsevolod Yashkin — Zholudev
- Stanislav Rumyantsev — Krylov
- Evgeny Romantsov — Slutsky, police captain
- Vladimir Chuprikov — Blumkin
- Andrey Lebedev — Kolchin
- Anastasia Stepanyuk — Ekaterina
- Vladimir Shulga — Nikolai Spiridonov, restaurant maître d'

== Production and reception ==
Filming took place in the Moscow region, mainly at abandoned factories. The small town setting was portrayed by Morozovsky Gorodok in Tver. The first trailer was released online on 18 January 2021. The series premiered on 16 February 2021 on More.tv, Wink, and KinoPoisk HD.

Critics initially saw the series as a Russian attempt at a British-style gangster drama similar to Peaky Blinders and a remake of the Soviet film The Meeting Place Cannot Be Changed. The attempt was criticized for problems with the script, character development, and style. Comparisons were also made with the 2007 Russian series Liquidation. Columnist Valentina Lvova of Komsomolskaya Pravda commented that the series "did not succeed in capturing Klesh. Too much psychology for a comic, too little truth for good cinema". Some critics noted the series could not be taken seriously, describing it as having a "comic-book aesthetic" with "inside jokes". According to Fontanka.ru, "the series tries to combine the best traditions of Soviet cinema and modern trends — predictably unsuccessfully".

Director Igor Zaytsev responded that the series was not intended to resemble The Meeting Place Cannot Be Changed or Liquidation and that online comments reflect "the opinion of a minority of dissatisfied viewers".
