= Bender: The Beginning =

- Directed by: Igor Zaytsev
- Written by: Oleg Malovichko
- Produced by: Aleksandr Tsekalo; Ivan Samokhvalov; Varya Avdyushko; Aleksandra Remizova; Anastasiya Fateeva
- Starring: Sergey Bezrukov; Aram Vardevanyan; Nikita Kologrivyy; Taisiya Vilkova; Aleksandr Tsekalo
- Cinematography: Sergei Trofimov
- Edited by: Yekaterina Beresnevich
- Music by: Ryan Otter
- Production companies: Sreda; Russia-1
- Distributed by: Central Partnership
- Release date: 24 June 2021 (Russia)
- Running time: 96 minutes
- Country: Russia
- Language: Russian
- Box office: ₽50 million

Bender: The Beginning, also known as Ostap Bender. The Beginning (Russian: Бендер: Начало) is a 2021 Russian action adventure comedy film directed by Igor Zaytsev, a prequel to The Twelve Chairs from the production company Sreda. It stars Sergey Bezrukov as Ibrahim Bender, and Aram Vardevanyan in the role was dedicated to Ostap Bender-Zadunaisky.

It is scheduled to be theatrically released on 24 June 2021.

The film is set in 1919 and shows as the young idealist named Osip runs into the Turkish swindler, Ibrahim Bender, who, like Osip, hunts for a royal relic. Osip learns from Ibrahim flattery, deception, blackmail and brute force, falls in love with a fatal beautiful foreigner and becomes the legendary Ostap Bender.

== Plot ==
The film is set in Russia during the Civil War in 1919. In August of that year, American businessman Armand Hammer arrives in Moscow and meets with Soviet government official Lev Trotsky. Hammer negotiates the sale of a valuable scepter belonging to Count Pyotr Rumyantsev for one million dollars, agreeing to deliver it to the Romanian city of Constanța. Trotsky dispatches the scepter with a courier by train to the town of Solnechnomorsk, where it is to be forwarded to its destination.

Meanwhile, a conman named Ibrahim Bender is about to be executed by villagers but manages to escape by jumping onto a passing train—the very train carrying the precious relic. The train is attacked by a band of Makhno’s insurgents, and the courier hides the scepter in one of the coffins in the baggage car before being killed. Ibrahim inadvertently learns of the hiding place.

Upon arriving in Solnechnomorsk, Bender attempts to break into the funeral home where the coffins have been delivered, but he is caught by aspiring actor Ostap Zadunaisky, who is in love with Sonya, the funeral director’s daughter. The young idealist Ostap and the seasoned trickster Ibrahim form an unlikely alliance and plan to steal the scepter.

== Cast ==
- Sergey Bezrukov as Ibrahim Suleiman Berta-Maria Bender-Bey
- Aram Vardevanyan as Osip "Osya" Zadunaisky (Ostap Bender-Zadunaisky)
- Nikita Kologrivyy as Mishka Yaponchik
- Taisiya Vilkova as Eva Machulskaya, a swindler
- Natalya Bochkareva as Madame Tsits
- Georgy Shtil as Fuks
- Aleksandr Tsekalo as Mark Sokolovich
- Yuliya Rutberg as Madame Sokolovich
- Yuliya Makarova as Sofi Sokolovich
- Olga Sutulova as Osip's mother
- Garik Kharlamov as Valiadis, host cabaret
- Artyom Tkachenko as Staff captain Ametistov, military commandant of Solnechnomorsk
- Aleksandr Ilin as Mendel Vinnitsky, Mishka's father
- Yuri Kolokolnikov as Grigory Kotovsky
- Pavel Derevyanko as Nestor Makhno
- Andrey Levin as Leon Trotsky
- Richard Lappers as Mr. Armand Hammer

== Production ==
The film was shot by the Sreda company, owned by Aleksandr Tsekalo, and the television channel Russia-1. The film was directed by Igor Zaytsev. Bender: The Beginning is the first part of the series, followed by the films Bender: Gold of the Empire and Bender: The Final Hustle. It is assumed that later on from these pictures a single series about Ostap Bender will be created.

== See also ==
- Bender: Gold of the Empire – Part 2 (2021 film)
- Bender: The Final Hustle – Part 3 (2021 film)
