= Vitali Bezrukov =

Soviet and Russian actor (born 1942)

Vitali Sergeyevich Bezrukov (Russian: Вита́лий Сергее́вич Безру́ков; born 1 January 1942 in Gorky Oblast) is a Soviet and Russian actor and theatre director.

He has made appearances with his son, Sergei Bezrukov, in two TV miniseries, Brigada (2002) and Yesenin (2005), as well as in the 2002 production of the play Aleksandr Pushkin, which Vitali directed, at the Yermolova Theatre.

== Biography ==
After graduating from high school in the city of Gorky he enrolled in drama school Sverdlovsk theater. He graduated in 1966, Moscow Art Theatre School with honors. As a student of IV-th year has played a major role in the play named after Mayakovsky Theatre "Oedipus Rex". He worked at the Moscow Art Theater, from 1969 he worked in Moscow Pushkin Drama Theatre. In the television film-opera "Anna Snegina" played poet Sergei Yesenin. From 1980 he worked in the Satire Theater.
