= Ruslan Muratov =

Russian composer

- Born: Ruslan Faizovich Muratov; June 8, 1960 (age 65); Astrakhan, USSR
- Occupations: Composer, musician

Ruslan Faizovich Muratov (Russian: Руслан Фаизович Муратов), born on June 8, 1960, is a Russian music composer of pop music and film scores.

== Biography ==
Ruslan Muratov was born and raised in the city of Astrakhan. He graduated from the Astrakhan College of Music (orchestral, pop-jazz department); Astrakhan State Conservatory (conducting and choral department).

From 1990 to 2008 – musical director, arranger, composer, keyboardist of Valery Leontiev's group. His songs first appeared in the repertory of Leontiev in 1991 in the film Psychic. A little later, his song "Nine chrysanthemum" became a hit on all radio stations and TV programs.

== Film scores (selected) ==
- Охота на изюбря (2005)
- Есенин (2005)
- The Turkish Gambit (2005)
- Тихий Дон (2006)
- Заколдованный участок (2006)
- Диверсант 2: Конец войны (2007)
- Я не я (2008)
- The Admiral (2008)
- Исчезнувшие (2009)
- High Security Vacation (2009)
- Подсадной (2010)
- Vysotsky. Thank You For Being Alive (2011)
- August Eighth (2012)

== Popular songs ==
- "Nine chrysanthemum" ("Девять Хризантем") by Valery Leontiev
- "Avgustin" ("Августин") by Valery Leontiev
- "Do svidaniya, Kilimanjaro" ("До свидания, Килиманджаро") by Valery Leontiev
- "Vremya" ("Время") by Valery Leontiev
- "Parahod" ("Пароход") by Valery Leontiev
