= Sergey Bezrukov =

Russian actor and singer (born 1973)

- Сергей Безруков
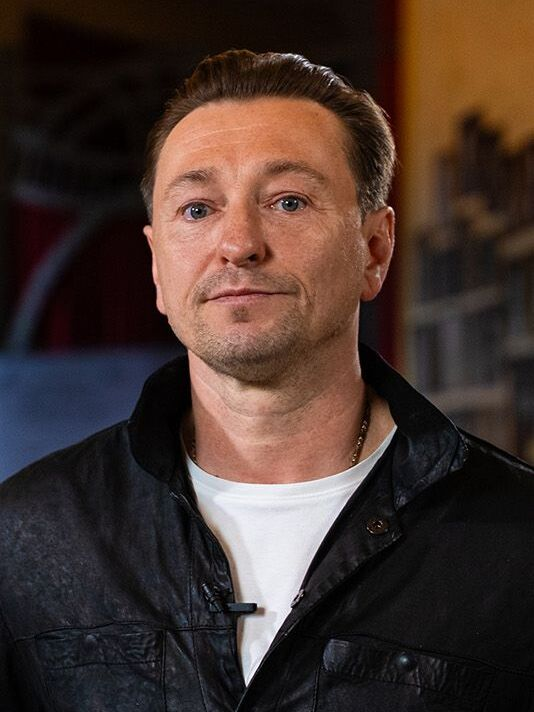
- Bezrukov in 2025
- Born: Sergey Vitalyevich Bezrukov; 18 October 1973 (age 52); Moscow, Russian SFSR, Soviet Union
- Education: Moscow Art Theatre School
- Occupation: Actor
- Years active: 1994–present
- Political party: United Russia
- Parent(s): Vitali Bezrukov (father); Natalia Bezrukova (mother)
- Awards: People's Artist of Russia; Meritorious Artist of Russia; State Prize of the Russian Federation
- Website: Sergey Bezrukov

Sergey Vitalyevich Bezrukov (Russian: Серге́й Вита́льевич Безру́ков; born 18 October 1973) is a Russian film and stage actor, singer, People's Artist of Russia, the laureate of the State Prize of the Russian Federation. He currently works at Tabakov Studio (the theatre of Oleg Tabakov). He is a member of the Supreme Council of the party United Russia.

== Biography ==
=== Early life and education ===
Sergei Bezrukov was born on 18 October 1973 in Moscow. His father was Vitali Bezrukov, an actor and director who worked at the Moscow Satire Theatre. Sergei's mother was Natalia Bezrukova (née Surova), she graduated from the Gorky College of Soviet Trade and worked as a shop manager. Sergei Bezrukov was named in honor of his father's favorite poet, Sergei Yesenin.

After graduating from secondary school No. 402 in the Perovsk district of Moscow in 1990, he entered the Moscow Art Theatre School. In 1994 he graduated from the acting department of the Moscow Art Theater School, with the specialization being Actor of Drama Theater and Cinema (Oleg Tabakov's workshop), and was immediately accepted into the troupe of the Moscow Theater Studio under Oleg Tabakov.

=== Career ===
From 1995 until 2000, he worked on the satirical program Puppets which aired on the NTV channel. Puppets were used on the show to represent famous people, mainly politicians. He voiced twelve characters on the show, among them such famous personalities as Boris Yeltsin and Vladimir Zhirinovsky. Bezrukov gained more exposure as an actor with the show.

In 2002, Bezrukov gained his big break; he got the role of gang leader Sasha Belov in the popular crime TV show Brigada. After the series aired Sergei Bezrukov became a household name in Russia. He voiced the title character of the Prince Vladimir animated film. He is also known for his theatre role of Chichikov in Dead Souls (which won the Moskovskij Komsomolets' award). In 2006, he portrayed Alexander Pushkin, revered as the Russian language's greatest poet, in Pushkin: The Last Duel.

According to the survey of ROMIR Monitoring, in Russia, he was called the favorite actor of 2005.

In March 2014, he signed a letter in support of the position of the President of Russia Vladimir Putin on Russia's military intervention in Ukraine.

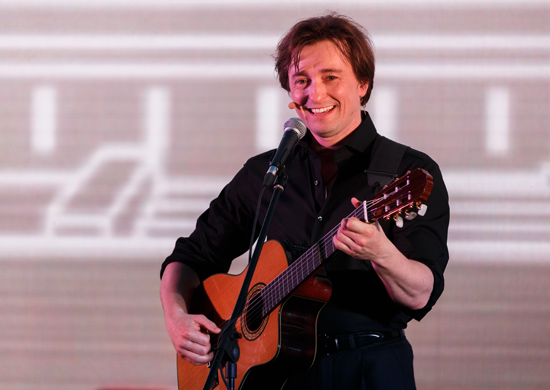
Sergei Bezrukov reads poetry at the National Control Center of Defense, June 2015

In 2020, he advocated the 2020 amendments to the Constitution of Russia, which, in particular, are defining marriage as a relationship between one man and one woman. He explained his position by saying that the terms 'parent 1 and parent 2' shouldn't be allowed to exist in Russia. "I promote love between a man and a woman, and prefer not experiment with gender equality", he also said.

== Sanctions ==
In July 2022, the EU imposed sanctions on Sergey Bezrukov for his active public support of the Russian invasion of Ukraine, as well as the illegal Russian annexation of Crimea.

== Personal life ==
From 2000 to 2015, he was married to actress Irina Bezrukova (to marry Bezrukov she broke up with actor Igor Livanov, they became officially married when Sergei was acting in the TV series Brigada). In 2015 the couple separated.

Sergei Bezrukov married director and screenwriter Anna Matison on 11 March 2016. On 4 July 2016 they had a daughter, Maria.

At the end of 2013, the media, citing Bezrukov's father, reported that Sergei had young children: daughter Alexandra and son Ivan; their mother was identified as a St. Petersburg actress by the name of Kristina Smirnova (born 1983 in Latvia).

== Selected filmography ==
Film
Year	Title	Role	Notes
1990	Stalin's Funeral	besprizornik	uncredited
1999	China Tea Set	Nikolay Sidikhin	
2003	One Life	Pavel	
2005	Shadowboxing	Sasha White	
2006	Kiss of a Butterfly	Nikolai Orlanov	
2006	Prince Vladimir	Prince Vladimir	voice, animated film
2006	Pushkin: The Last Duel	Alexander Pushkin	
2007	The Irony of Fate 2	Irakliy Izmaylov	
2008	Admiral	General Kappel	
2009	Taras Bulba	Narrator	voice
2009	High Security Vacation	Viktor 'Sumrak' Sumarokov	
2011	Vysotsky. Thank You For Being Alive	Vladimir Vysotsky / Yura	
2011	Yolki 2	Vladimir Snegiryov	
2012	The Ballad of Uhlans	Lieutenant Gorzhevskiy	
2012	Moms	Mikhail	Segment "My beloved"
2016	Sheep and Wolves	Magra	voice
2016	After You're Gone	Alexey Temnikov	
2020	The Last Frontier	Captain Ivan Starchak	
2021	Summer Time: Travel Back	Yura Kovalev	
2021	Bender: The Beginning	Ibrahim Bender	
2021	Bender: Gold of the Empire	Ibrahim Bender	
2021	Saving Pushkin	Sergey Trofimov	
2022	Mister Knockout	Grigory Kusikyants	
2022	Dads	Alexander	
2023	Nuremberg	Roman Rudenko	
2023	Air	Alexey Astafiev	
2025	August	Pavel Alyokhin	

TV
Year	Title	Role	Notes
2000	Chivalric Romance		
2002	Azazel	Ivan Brilling	
2002	Brigada	Sasha White	
2004	Moscow Saga	Vasily Stalin	
2005	Yesenin	Sergey Yesenin	
2005	The Master and Margarita	Yeshua Ha-Nozri	
2011	Black Wolves	Pavel Khromov	
2017	Trotsky	Vladimir Skalon	
2018	Godunov	Boris Godunov	
2023	Spy	Andrey Rybin	
2026	Knyaz Andrey	Kuchko	
