= List of sambo practitioners =

Notable practitioners of the martial art of sambo

This is a list of notable sambo practitioners.

== Founders ==
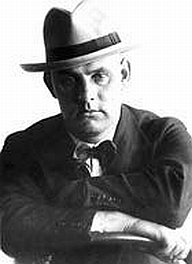
Vasili Oshchepkov

- Vasili Oshchepkov (January 7, 1893 - October 10, 1938) was a researcher of different types of national wrestling and martial arts. He was ranked as a Merited Master of Sports of the USSR and an Honored Coach of the USSR. He was one of the founders of sambo, a martial art developed in the Soviet Union. During the political purges of 1937, Oshchepkov was accused of being a Japanese spy, and was executed in prison as a result
- Viktor Spiridonov (December 20, 1882 - September 9, 1944) was a researcher of various kinds of wrestling and martial arts, a Merited Master of Sports of the USSR, and a Honored Coach of the USSR. He was one of the founders of sambo
- Anatoly Kharlampiyev (29 October 1906 – 16 April 1979) was a Russian researcher of various kinds of national wrestling and martial arts, Merited Master of Sports of the USSR, and Honored Coach of Sports of the USSR. He was one of the founders of sambo. Kharlampiyev worked as a physical education trainer at the Communist University of the Toilers of the East, and also was a student of boxing, fencing, acrobatics, and mountaineering. In 1938, Kharlampiyev presented sambo to the USSR All-Union Sports Committee, which recognized the martial art as an official sport

== Hall of Fame ==
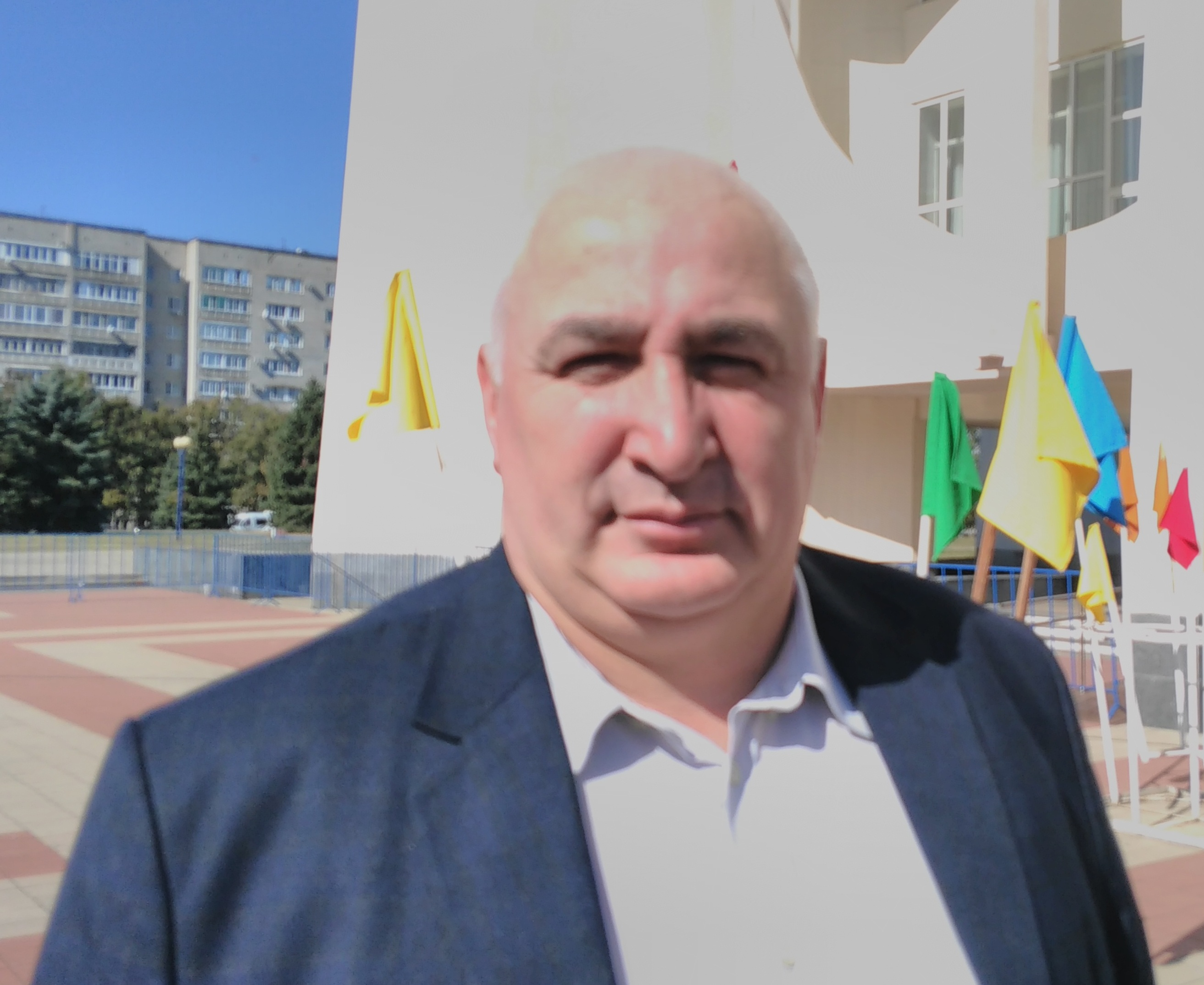
Murat Khasanov

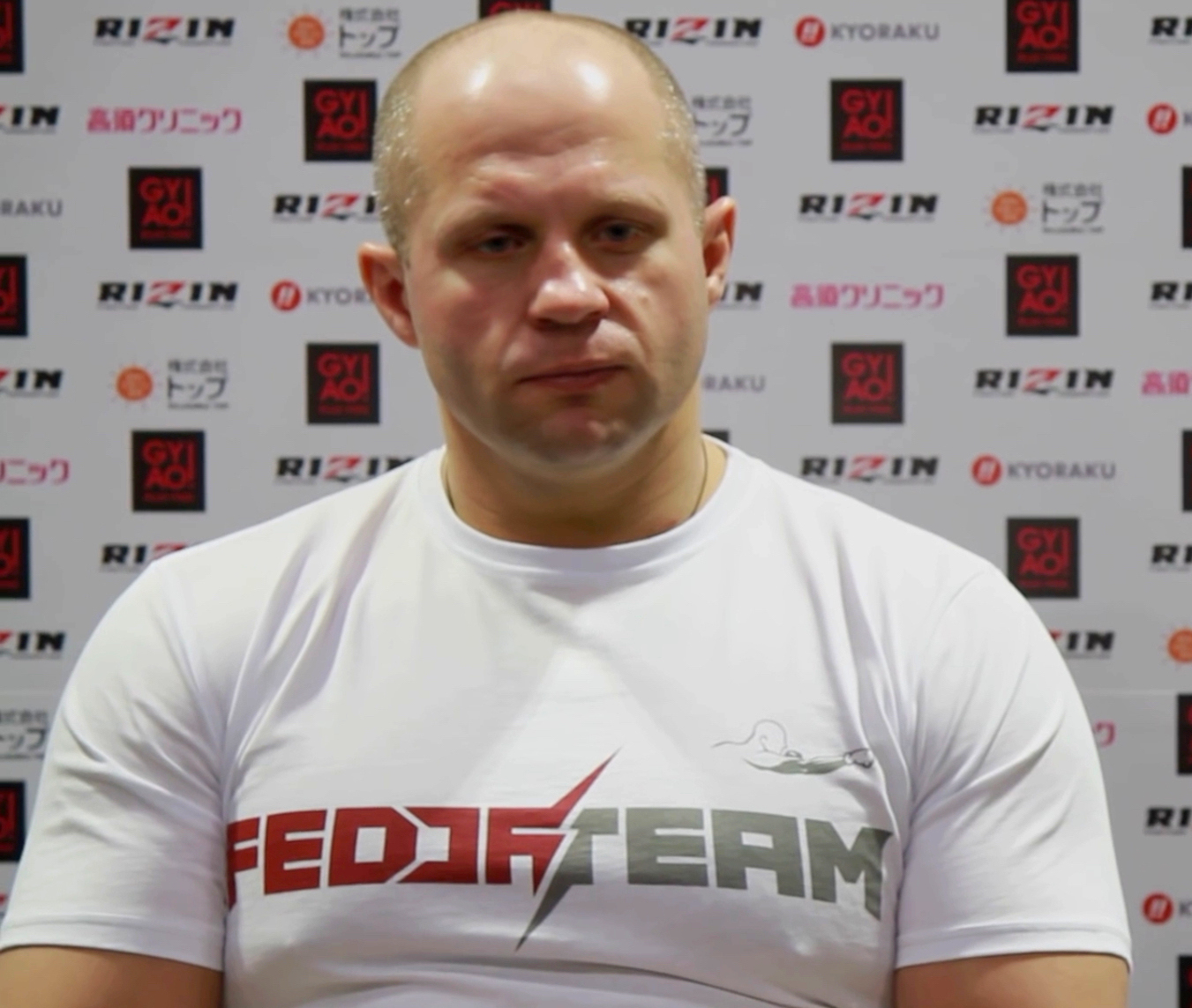
Fedor Emelianenko

As per the International Sambo Federation (FIAS)

- Fedor Emelianenko, 4-time combat SAMBO world champion and seven-time Russian champion, Honoured Master of Sports in SAMBO, Awarded an Order for Merit to the Fatherland of II class, Order of Peter the Great of I class. Two-time Russian national Judo Bronze medalist, he was the last Heavyweight champion of the PRIDE Fighting Championships and was the consensus No. 1 ranked Heavyweight MMA fighter in the world for over seven years and undefeated for 10 years in all of MMA
- Svetlana Galante, 7-time world champion, 8-time winner of the World Cup, Awarded a medal of the Ministry of Defense of the Russian Federation “For Military Valour” of II class, “Gold Belt”, Multiple winner of title “Sportswoman of the Year”
- Murat Khasanov, 11-time world heavyweight champion in SAMBO, 8-time winner of the World Cup, 7-time champion of Europe, 19-time Russian SAMBO champion, Honoured Master of Sports of Russia, Awarded with the Order of Friendship
- Marko Kosev, 5-time world champion from Bulgaria
- Irina Rodina, 11-time world champion, Multiple winner of Championships of Europe, Awarded an Order for Merit to the Fatherland of II class, “Sport Elite of Prikamye”, “Gold Belt”, “Sports Heroine” title

== Sport sambo ==
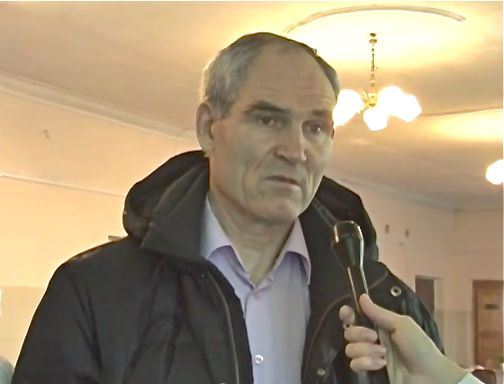
Alexander Pushnitsa

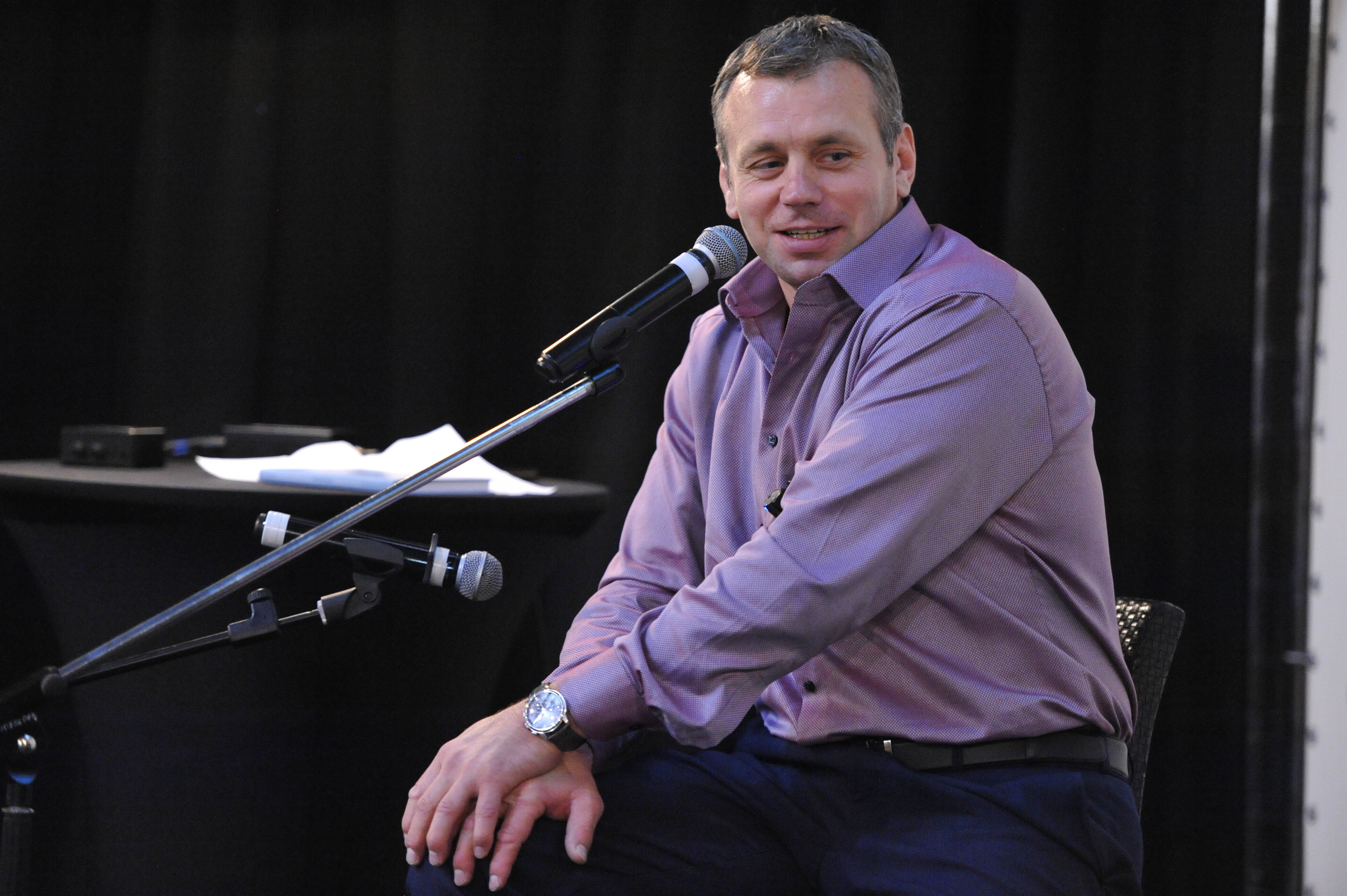
Igor Kurinnoy

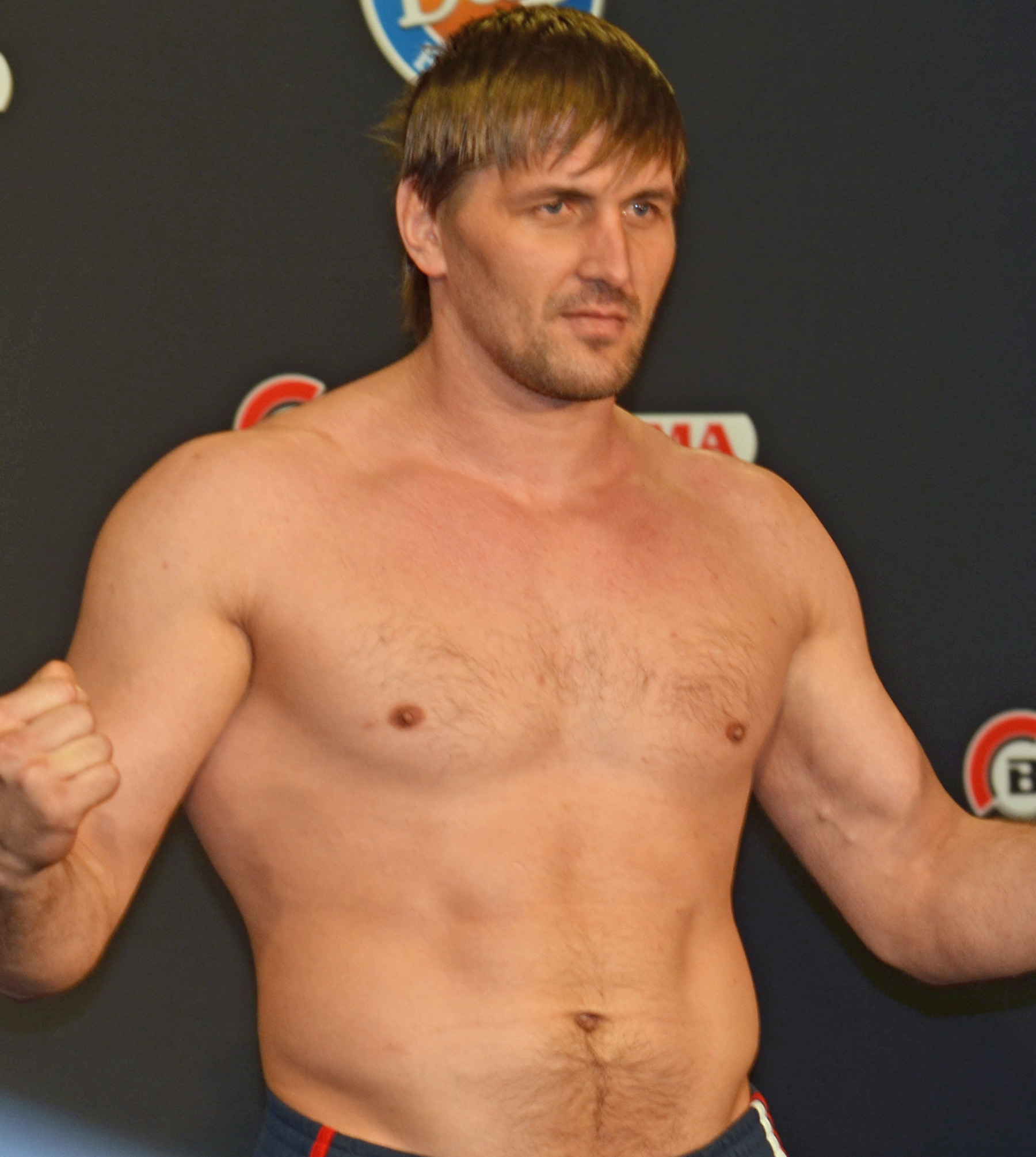
Vitaly Minakov

- Khorloogiin Bayanmönkh, Sambo world champion and silver medalist in Wrestling at the 1972 Summer Olympics
- Chris Dolman, 1969 World Cup Champion, 1985 World Champion and 1985 World Games Champion. Eight-time Judo champion of Netherlands, European Judo silver medalist, four-time Greco-Roman wrestling champion of Benelux. Also the first primary trainer for Rings Holland and Dolman Gym, the mixed martial arts teams for which Alistair Overeem, Valentijn Overeem and Gegard Mousasi all were members. Also trainer and co-owner of Chakuriki Gym
- James Chico Hernandez, First sambo champion to be featured on a box of Wheaties Energy Crunch. He won the 2000 FIAS World Cup silver medal, FIAS Pan American silver medal, 10 time USA AAU Sambo Champion, three-time British FIAS silver medalist, and bronze medal winner at the 2010 FIAS Championships of Scotland. 2009 American Sambo Association's Pioneer of American Sambo Award winner
- Garry Kallos, Canadian, Pan American Games champion
- Andrei Kazusionak, Belarusian sport sambo champion, European Judo champion, and Olympian
- Igor Kurinnoy, a Merited Master of Sport, three-time sambo world champion, a five-time Sambo World Cup champion and director of Borec Sports Club
- Vitaly Minakov, four-time sambo world champion, four-time Russian national champion
- Marina Mokhnatkina, six-time world champion, two-time European champion in sambo. She is also an eight-time Russian champion in sambo
- Beslan Mudranov, 2007 World Sambo Championships Silver Medalist and gold medalist in Judo at the 2016 Summer Olympics
- Slavko Obadov, 1973 World Sambo Championships Silver Medalist and bronze medalist in Judo at the 1976 Summer Olympics
- Alexander Pushnitsa, three-time sambo world champion, two-time European champion, nine-time champion of the USSR, Merited Master of Sports of the USSR
- Ahad Rajabli, World Champion and multiple champion of Azerbaijan
- David Rudman, USSR, champion of the first International Sambo Tournament, at 70 kg, and first World Champion in the weight category up to 68 kg
- Yury Rybak, Belarusian sport sambo champion, and World Judo silver medalist
- Genrikh Shults, 6-times Soviet Sport Sambo Champion (85 kg), the first captain of the USSR national Judo team, European Judo champion (80 kg)
- Scott Sonnon, Honourable Master of Sports in Sambo from the AASF, was nominated for (but did not win) the American Sambo Association's Pioneer of American Sambo Award, World University Sambo Games Silver Medalist (not an official University games event), USA Grand National and Pan-American Sambo Champion, and USA National Sambo Team Coach
- Dorjsürengiin Sumiyaa, 3-time Sambo world champion and silver medalist in Judo at the 2016 Summer Olympics
- Ron Tripp, 1994 World Champion and 7 times World Medalist capturing 8 US National Titles and 6 Pan Am Golds during his career (both FIAS East and West). A Judo champion and current general secretary of USA Judo. Tripp was promoted to 10th degree in sambo in 1995 and became America's first International Distinguished Master of Sport in 1996. Also in 1996, he served as World Team Coach at the Tokyo World Championships. At the 1993 U.S. Sambo Championships, he scored a total victory throw over Brazilian Jiu-Jitsu legend Rickson Gracie, the only time Gracie was defeated in competition
- Khashbaataryn Tsagaanbaatar, Sambo world champion and bronze medalist in Judo at the 2004 Summer Olympics

== Combat sambo ==
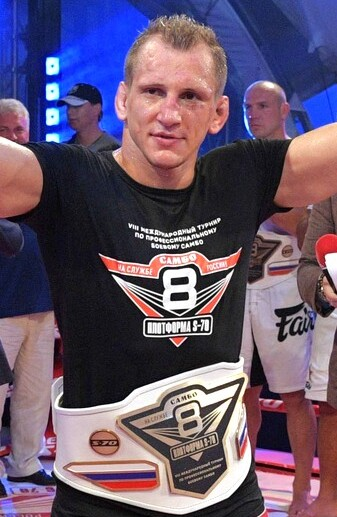
Vyacheslav Vasilevsky

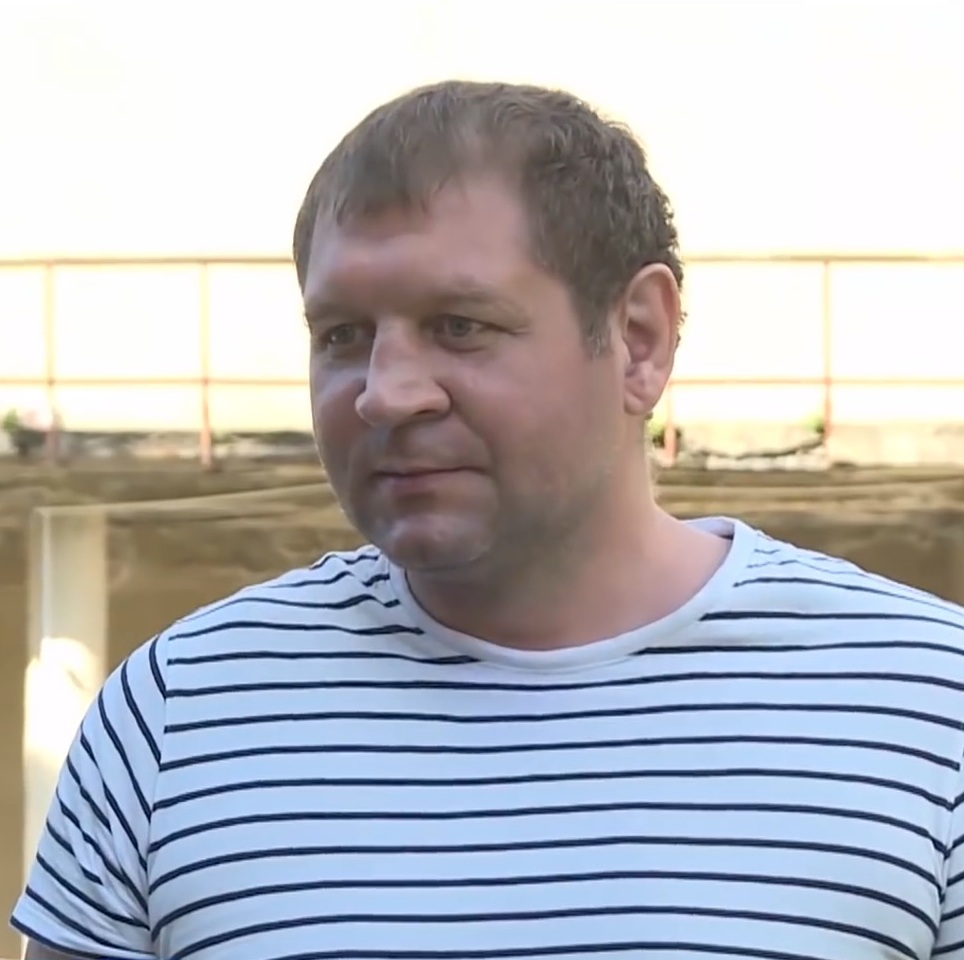
Alexander Emelianenko

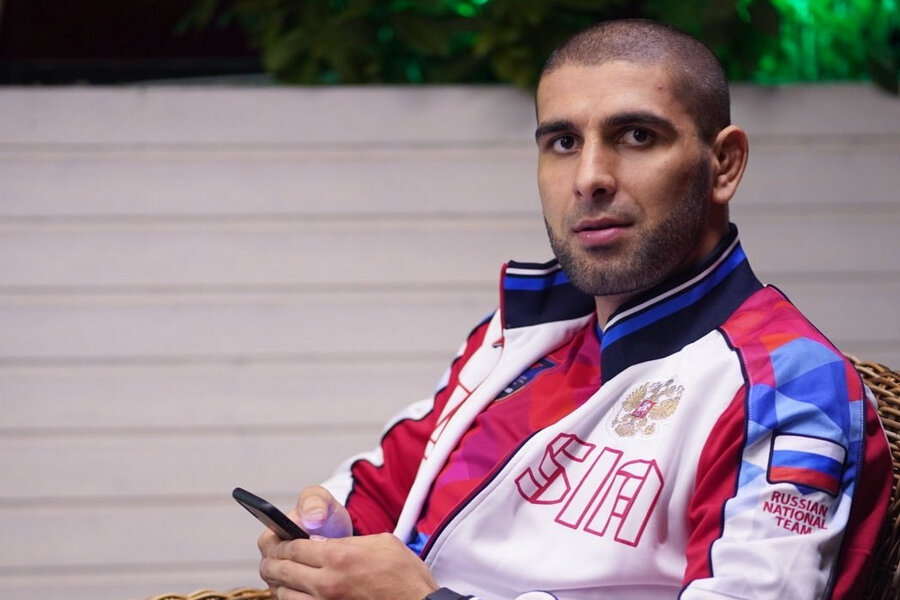
Magomed Magomedov

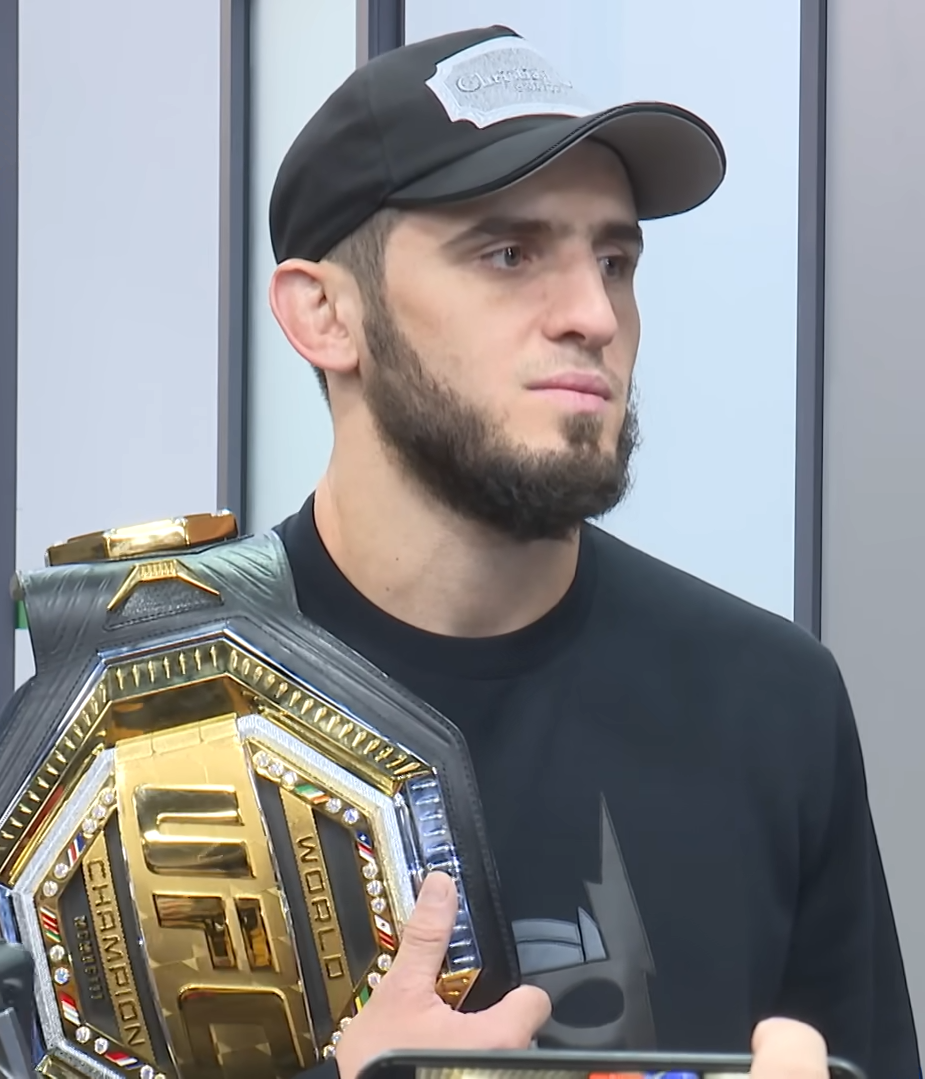
Islam Makhachev

- Sultan Aliev, 2-time World Combat Sambo Champion, and mixed martial artist from Russia
- Ikram Aliskerov, World Combat Sambo Champion, and mixed martial artist from Russia
- Yaroslav Amosov, 4-time WCSF World Combat Sambo Champion, Bellator Welterweight Champion and mixed martial artist from Ukraine
- Rosen Dimitrov, World Combat Sambo Champion, and mixed martial artist from Bulgaria
- Rumen Dimitrov, World Combat Sambo Champion, and mixed martial artist from Bulgaria
- Aleksander Emelianenko, Fedor Emelianenko's brother, and is a 3-time World Sambo Champion
- Sergej Grecicho, two-time Lithuanian combat sambo champion, mixed martial artist
- Blagoi Ivanov, Won the over 100 kg combat sambo gold medal at the 2008 World Sambo Championships, at 22 years of age he notably defeated Fedor Emelianenko
- Magomed Magomedov, Judoka and 3-time World Combat Sambo Champion from Russia
- Rasul Mirzaev, World Combat Sambo Champion in Tashkent 2010
- Valentin Moldavsky, 2-time World Combat Sambo Champion, and mixed martial artist from Russia
- Victor Nemkov, 2011 World Combat Sambo Champion, and mixed martial artist from Russia
- Vyacheslav Vasilevsky, 6-time World Combat Sambo Champion, and mixed martial artist from Russia
- Mikhail Zayats, 2008 World Combat Sambo Champion, and mixed martial artist from Russia

== Mixed martial arts ==
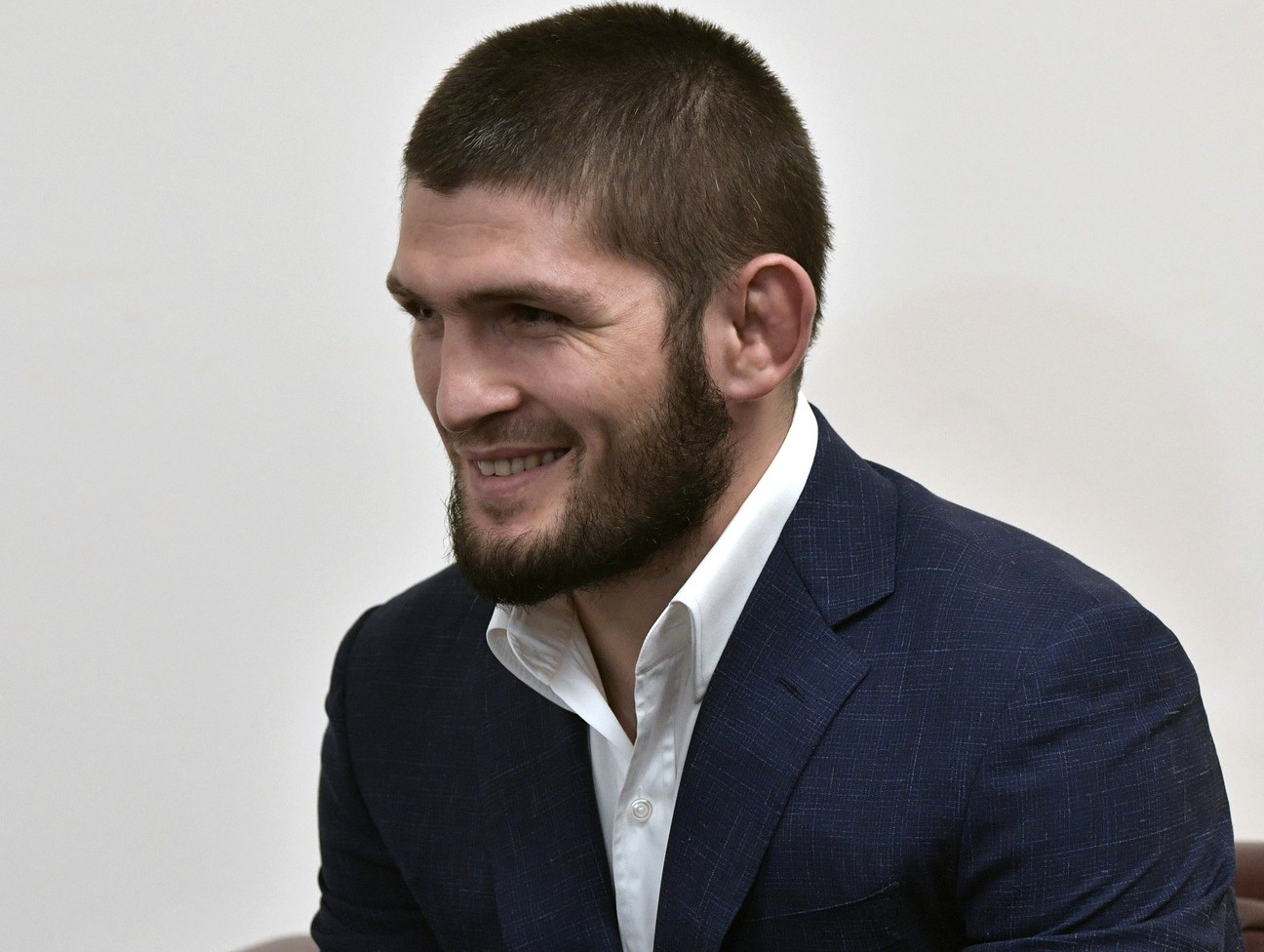
Khabib Nurmagomedov

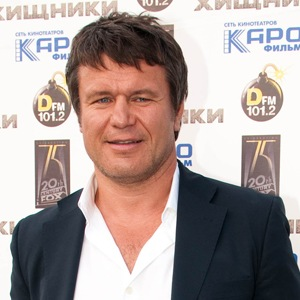
Oleg Taktarov

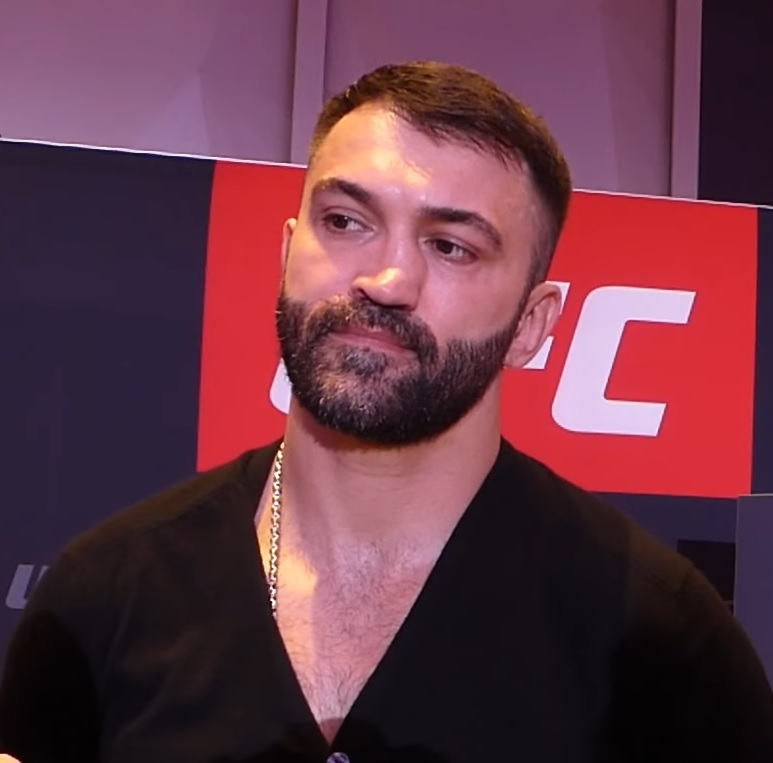
Andrei Arlovski

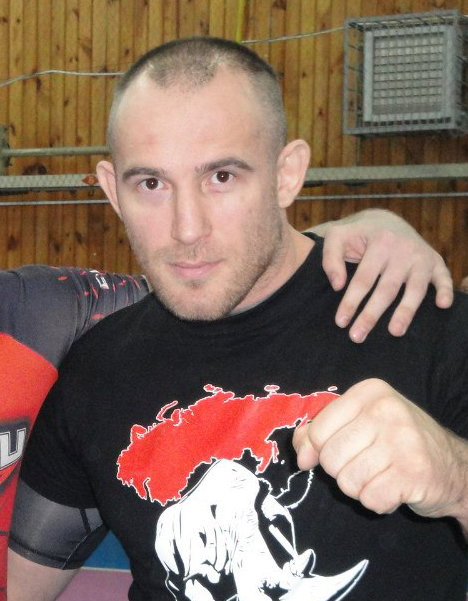
Alexey Oleynik

- Yaroslav Amosov, Ukrainian sambo and MMA fighter in the welterweight category. Four-time world sambo champion, two-time European champion and Eurasia champion, European Cup winner, as well as the winner of many national and international competitions
- Andrei Arlovski, UFC Heavyweight champion, won gold at the World Youth Championships, and silver at World Cup and World Championships
- Gokor Chivichyan, Armenian judo, wrestling and sambo instructor, resides and teaches in the USA
- Ion Cuțelaba, European Combat Sambo Champion
- Merab Dvalishvili, UFC Bantamweight Champion
- Eldar Eldarov, BRAVE CF Super Lightweight Champion
- Megumi Fujii, former MMA fighter.
- Magomedkhan Gamzatkhanov, a.k.a Volk Han, 1987 and 1988 USSR Champion, 1987 and 1988 Russian National Champion, Merited Master of Sports of the USSR. Multiple time freestyle wrestling champion of Dagestan. Also the first primary trainer for the Russian Top Team, the mixed martial arts team for which Fedor Emelianenko, Aleksander Emelianenko, and Sergei Kharitonov all were members
- Sergei Kharitonov, former PRIDE Fighting Championship competitor
- Movlid Khaybulaev, PFL Featherweight Champion
- Andrei Kopylov, 1986 and 1991 Spartakiad of Peoples of the USSR Champion, 1991 USSR Champion. Also primary trainer for the Russian Top Team
- Dean Lister, American MMA fighter, 2x ADCC champion, U.S. National Sambo Champion
- Islam Makhachev, 2016 Combat Sambo World Champion, UFC Lightweight Champion, UFC Welterweight Champion
- Vadim Nemkov, 4-time World Combat Sambo Champion, Bellator Light Heavyweight World Champion
- Khabib Nurmagomedov, two-time world combat sambo champion, UFC Lightweight Champion, retired with a 29–0 record
- Umar Nurmagomedov, 2015 WCSF World Combat Sambo Champion and UFC fighter
- Usman Nurmagomedov, Bellator MMA Lightweight Champion
- Alexey Oleinik, Ukrainian-Russian mixed martial artist, and combat sambo competitor
- Shavkat Rakhmonov, World and Asian MMA Champion, M-1 Global Welterweight Champion
- Satoko Shinashi, accomplished Japanese mixed martial arts competitor
- Dennis Siver, Russian-German MMA fighter in the UFC
- Oleg Taktarov, UFC 6 tournament champion, UFC Ultimate Ultimate 1995 tournament finalist, and actor
- Shamil Zavurov, Russian mixed martial artist of Avar descent, who competes in the Welterweight and Lightweight divisions. A professional MMA competitor since 2004, he is the former M-1 Global World Welterweight champion

== Other notable sambo practitioners ==
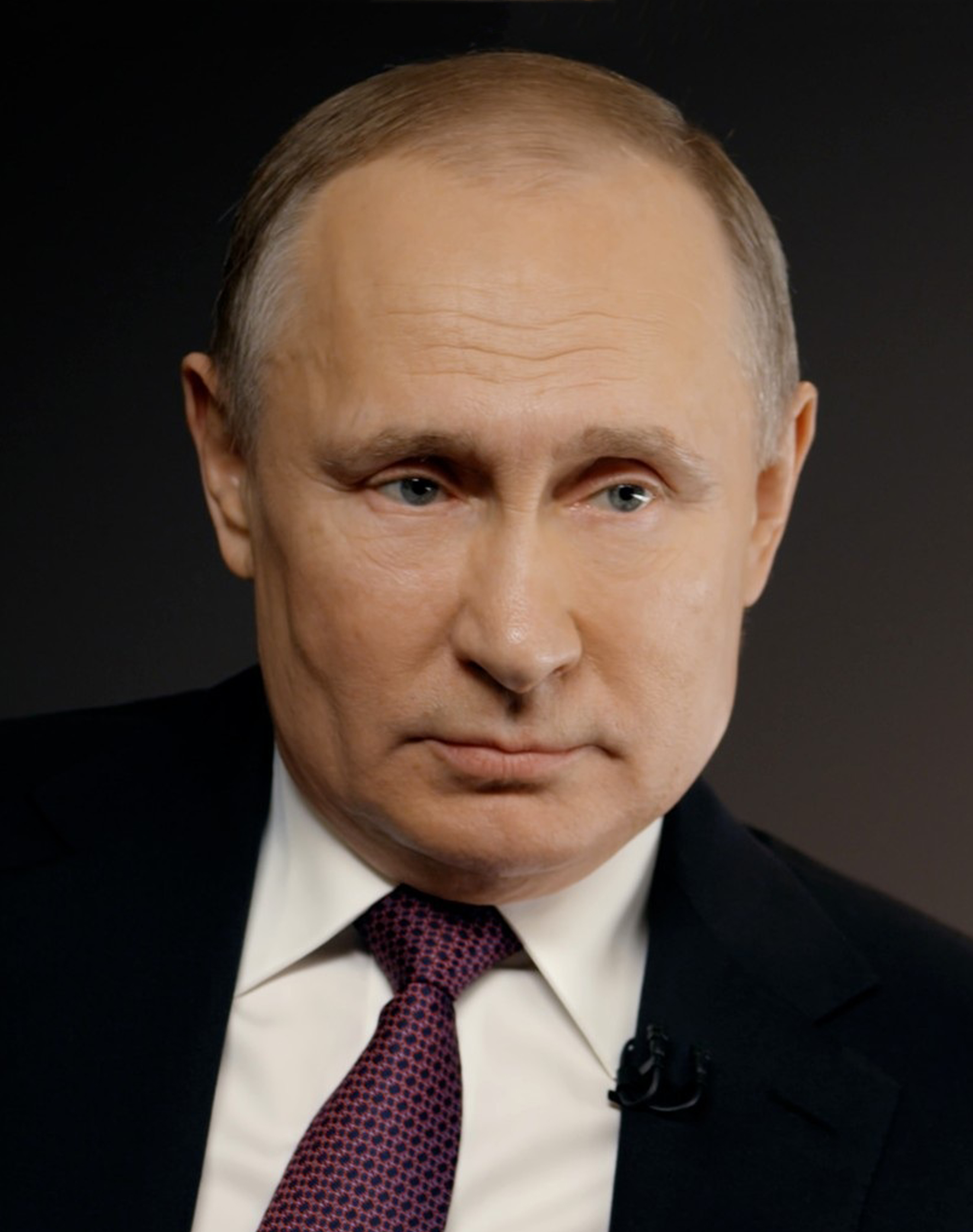
Vladimir Putin

- Badmaanyambuugiin Bat-Erdene, won a gold medal in the Sambo jacket wrestling in the 1989 World Sambo Championships, Defense Minister of Mongolia from 2016 to July 2017, member of national legislature of Mongolia State Great Khural
- Khaltmaagiin Battulga, Mongolian politician and Sambo wrestler who served as the President of Mongolia from 10 July 2017 to 25 June 2021. He was a Sambo World Champion.
- Hiroshi Hase, Japanese Olympian and professional wrestler, who went on a learning excursion in June 1989, under the tutelage of Victor Koga. He would later become involved in Japanese politics.
- Takayuki Iizuka, Japanese professional wrestler, who went on a learning excursion in June 1989, under the tutelage of Victor Koga.
- Aleksandr Karelin, Russian athlete who is widely regarded as the greatest Greco-Roman wrestler of all time. Karelin was a champion in sambo during his service in the Internal Troops of the USSR.
- Victor Koga was a Russian-Japanese judoka and sambo instructor, known for introducing the art in Japan. He would train Hiroshi Hase and Takayuki Iizuka in sambo.
- Vladimir Putin, Russian politician who has served as the President of Russia since 2012, previously holding the position from 1999 until 2008. He was also the Prime Minister of Russia from 1999 to 2000 and again from 2008 to 2012. He is a judo black belt and sambo practitioner.

== See also ==
- World Sambo Championships
