= Wild League =

Wild League may refer to:

- Wild League (film), a 2019 Russian historical sports drama film
- Wild League (water polo), an amateur water polo competition in Croatia
