= Wolfgang Cerny =

Austrian actor (born 1984)

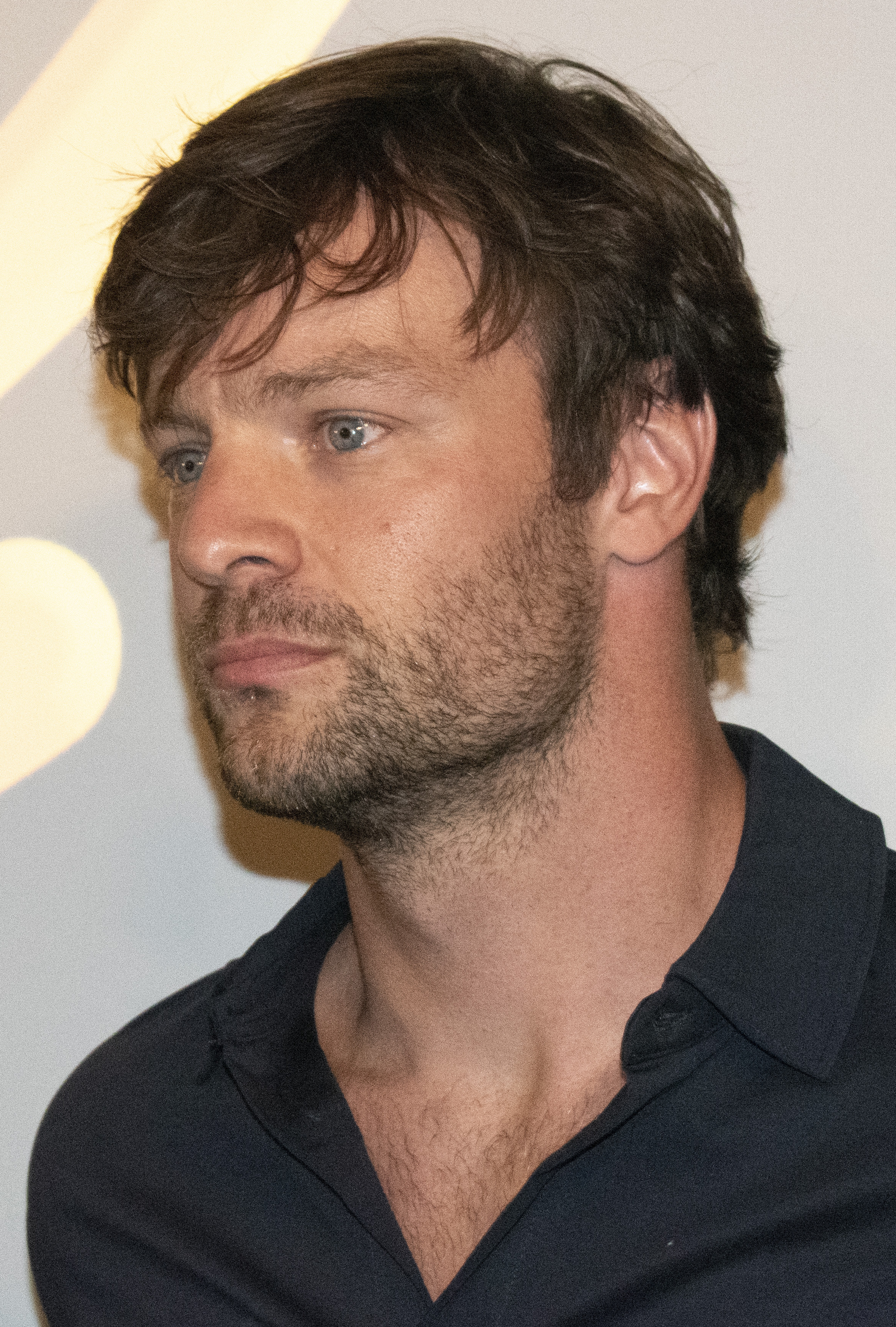
- Wolfgang Cerny at the Vienna Independent Film Festival, 2023
- Born: 31 August 1984 (age 42); Vienna, Austria
- Occupation: Actor
- Years active: 2005–present
- Spouse: Victoria Slobodyan (m. 2019)
- Children: 1
- Website: wolfgangcerny.com

Wolfgang Cerny (born 31 August 1984) is an Austrian actor and producer, best known for his roles in the German soap opera Storm of Love (2009–2010), Russian action movies The Red Ghost (2021) and Nuremberg (2023) and one episode of the Netflix-Series Vikings: Valhalla.

== Life and career ==
Wolfgang Cerny grew up in a family of doctors and sportsmen in Vienna, Austria. He was heavily involved in sports, including martial arts, boxing, horse riding, swimming, alpine skiing and surfing. He was in the swim team and is a certified ski-instructor and member of the Red Devils in Kitzbühel. Originally Cerny chose to become a doctor like his father and older brother, so he enrolled in the medical university of Vienna and passed the first year's exams. After two years he dropped out to pursue an acting career. Cerny went to Los Angeles and studied at the American Academy of Dramatic Arts as well as at the Music and Arts University of the City of Vienna. Later he also participated in film projects at the Vienna Film Academy and the University of Applied Arts Vienna. The short film We Are All Naked Underneath (2006, directed by Alexander Dirninger) won the Audience Award at the Sundance Film Festival as well as Best of Festival Brest 2007.

In May 2008, Cerny played in the Vienna Off-Theater in the play Taifun by Menyhért Lengyel, directed by Daniel Schrader. He also played in Vienna at the theater in the Drachengasse, which was awarded the Grand Prize of the Jury. In 2009, Cerny performed at the Volkstheater in a stage version of The Graduate.

In May 2009, Cerny graduated from the Music and Arts University of the City of Vienna and was immediately cast as Lukas Zastrow in the popular German telenovela Storm of Love which was a breakthrough role for him. From August 2009 to August 2010, he was the male lead of season 5 together with on-screen partner Sarah Stork.

In 2010–2011, Cerny was a member of the ensemble at the Schauburg in Munich and played in both classic and modern pieces by William Shakespeare and Blake Nelson. In 2011, Cerny played there the role of Prince Ferdinand in Shakespeare's late work The Tempest.

In the summer of 2012, Cerny took on the lead role of Alexander von Foss, a German sniper, in the Russian mini-series Snipers alongside Tatyana Arntgolts, directed by Zinovy Roizman. An instant hit, this project paved the way and led to him later becoming an in-demand actor in Russia and the former CIS countries. Especially for this role he learnt the Russian language, and more projects and offers in the East and West followed.

He took part in Mission: Impossible – Rogue Nation (2015), The Last Warrior (2017), as well as in the German speaking projects Hitlers Volk (2015) and SOKO München (2015).

In Tobol (2017), based on the popular novels, Cerny played Tabbert, a captive Swedish fencing master and explorer, in the Welsh movie Morfydd (2018) he impersonated wealthy prince Alexis.

Cerny was then offered the title role in the German movie Parzival (2017), the medieval questing knight and icon.

In the British spy comedy Action Team (2018), Cerny was cast as Bogohardt, an Austrian and Russian counterspy, alongside Tom Davis, Vicky McClure, Derek Riddell and Jim Howick.

In 2018, he played the sadistic staff sergeant Gustav Wagner in the Russian WWII drama Sobibor, which was based on real events and represented Russia at the Oscars 2019. Cerny received a lot of attention and praise for this role.

In 2019, Cerny played lead roles in Zoya (released in 2020), Curved Mirror and Tell Her by director Alexander Molochnikov.

In the horror film Row 19 (2020), which was shot entirely inside a constructed plane, Cerny starred alongside Svetlana Ivanova.

In an episode of the 11th season of the Austrian crime series SOKO Donau (2019), he guest starred as Thomas Wielking, a blacksmith and member of a medieval reenactment troupe.

In 2020, Cerny took part in the Russian ice-dancing television show Ice Age together with Olympic champion Oksana Domnina. Together they performed 13 shows over 13 weeks.

In 2021, Cerny played in The Red Ghost, a Russian WWII action-thriller film by Andrei Bogatirev, which was sold to more than 120 countries and became the eighth most popular Russian movie on IMDb of all time. He was then cast as Sten Sigurdsson in the Netflix television series Valhalla (2021).

In the internationally produced blockbuster Nuremberg (2023) by director Nikolai Lebedev, about the world-famous war tribunal, Cerny starred as Helmut.

After the 2022 Russian invasion of Ukraine, Cerny together with his family left Russia for Austria.

At the Vienna Independent Film Festival in 2023, Cerny received the award for Best Actor for his role in The Whirlpool (2022).

In 2023, the film Legends of Sambo directed by Andrei Bogatyrev and starring Cerny as Vasili Oshchepkov, inventor of Sambo, was released. Cerny also served as creative producer of the film.

In 2024, the fantasy miniseries Others was released on the KinoPoisk streaming service, where Cerny played the character Neumann, an aristocrat who owns an academy for people with supernatural gifts. The same year, Cerny was cast in the American film Nuremberg directed by James Vanderbilt.

== Personal life ==
Cerny has been in a relationship with Victoria Slobodyan since 2015. They married in 2019; in 2021, Victoria gave birth to their son. They live in Vienna, Austria.

In his spare time, Cerny enjoys CrossFit, skiing and the game Warhammer 40,000.

== Filmography ==
=== Films ===
List of film credits
| Year | Title | Role | Notes |
|---|---|---|---|
| 2015 | Mission: Impossible – Rogue Nation | Austrian Police Employee | |
| 2017 | The Last Warrior | Alyosha Popovich | |
| 2018 | Action Team | Bogohardt | |
| 2018 | T-34 | Wolf Hein | |
| 2018 | Sobibor | Gustav Wagner | |
| 2020 | Cosmoball | Bearded Man | |
| 2021 | Zoya | Hauptmann Erich Sommer | |
| 2021 | Tell Her | Michael | |
| 2021 | The Red Ghost | Braun | |
| 2021 | Row 19 | Aleksey | |
| 2021 | The Last Warrior: A Messenger of Darkness | Alyosha Popovich | |
| 2022 | The Whirlpool | Danila | |
| 2023 | Nuremberg | Helmuth | |
| 2023 | Legends of Sambo | Vasili Oshchepkov | |
| 2025 | Nuremberg | Baldur von Schirach | |

=== Television ===
List of television appearances
| Year | Title | Role | Notes |
|---|---|---|---|
| 2009–2010 | Storm of Love | Lukas Zastrow | Lead role |
| 2012 | Snipers | Alexander von Foss | Lead role |
| 2014 | SOKO Donau – Im Schatten der Macht | Felix Wimmer | 1 episode |
| 2015 | SOKO München – Und dann kam Alf | Tobias Klein | 1 episode |
| 2015 | Tatort – Grenzfall | Martin Ryba | 1 episode |
| 2019 | SOKO Donau | | Episode "Ritterschlag" |
| 2020 | Ice Age | Himself | |
| 2020 | Evening Urgant | Himself | |
| 2021 | Master | Kron Racing representative | |
| 2022 | Vikings: Valhalla | Sten Sigurdsson | |
| 2024 | Emperor's Treasures | Himself | |
| 2024 | Others | Neumann | KinoPoisk miniseries |
| 2025 | Konstantinopol | Kirpit | IVI miniseries |
