= Legends of Sambo =

- Film poster
- Directed by: Andrey Bogatyrev
- Screenplay by: Georgy Shengeliya
- Produced by: Andrey Bogatyrev; Konstantin Elkin; Wolfgang Cerny; Tatyana Voronetskaya; Yelena Belova; Vitaly Smagin
- Starring: Wolfgang Cerny; Dmitry Pavlenko; Anton Vohmin; Aleksey Shevchenkov
- Cinematography: Natalya Kozhevnikova
- Edited by: Aleksandr Karpov
- Music by: Sergey Solovyev
- Production company: ABS Film Company
- Distributed by: Russian World Vision
- Release date: November 16, 2023 (Russia)
- Running time: 104 minutes
- Country: Russia
- Language: Russian
- Budget: $1.6 million
- Box office: $262 949

Legends of Sambo, also known as The Legend of Sambo (Russian: Легенда о самбо, romanized: Legenda o sambo) is a 2023 Russian biographical sports-drama by Andrey Bogatyrev which tells the story of the origins of the Soviet martial art Sambo.

== Plot ==
The events take place in 1936 at the Moscow Spartakiad, where the strongest team of wrestlers was announced. Two martial arts masters collided in a decisive duel. One of them is Vasili Oshchepkov, who from an early age was involved in martial arts and studied judo with the best trainers in Japan. The other is Russo-Japanese War veteran Viktor Spiridonov (Dmitry Pavlenko), who has developed several techniques for self-defense. Both athletes are the key creators of the national wrestling called Sambo. Young and promising wrestler Anatoly Kharlampiyev is Oschepkov's disciple. Oschepkov is arrested and executed as a supposed Japanese spy. In the end Kharlampiyev is shown to continue the legacy of the Sambo movement.

== Cast ==
- Wolfgang Cerny as Vasili Oshchepkov
- Dmitry Pavlenko as Viktor Spiridonov
- Anton Vohmin as Anatoly Kharlampiyev
- Aleksey Shevchenkov as an employee of Cheka / NKVD
- Olga Stashkevich as Klavdia
- Pavel Abramenkov as Roma
- Vyacheslav Shikhaleev as an assistant
- Denis Kuznetsov as Senya
- Aleksandr Davydov as Marat

== Reception ==
Aleksei Komarov in a positive review for KinoReporter wrote - "In fact, Bogatyrev again made a kind of comic book film (previous - The Red Ghost), only now he was inspired by the traditions of constructivism, avant-garde, and the style of Soviet posters of the 1930s".
