= Viktor Spiridonov =

Russian sambo practitioner

- Born: Viktor Afanasievich Spiridonov; 20 December 1882; Vyatka Governorate, Russian Empire
- Died: 7 September 1944 (aged 61); Moscow, Soviet Union
- Nationality: Russian; Soviet Union
- Style: Sambo
- Rank: Merited Master of Sports of the USSR

Other information
- Notable students: Anatoly Kharlampiyev

Viktor Afanasievich Spiridonov (20 December 1882 – 9 September 1944) was a researcher of various kinds of wrestling and martial arts, a Merited Master of Sports of the USSR, and a Honored Coach of the USSR. He was one of the founders of Sambo, a martial art developed in the Soviet Union.

== Pre-revolutionary biography ==
Spiridonov started as an employee of the Dynamo, which was destroyed in 1941. The only source of information about his pre-revolutionary biography is his personal affair as a member of the Universal Military Training courses, discovered by the historian of the Russian hand-to-hand combat systems MN Lukashev in the Central State Archive of the USSR.

According to Spiridonov's own records, he descended from Vyatka Governorate. At seventeen, not graduating from high school, he went to the army as a private – ""volunteer" In his paper he was sent to the Kremlin battalion and earned some non-commissioned officer's stripes and was sent to the Kazan Infantry School, where he studied in the same platoon with the future Marshal of the Soviet Union Alexander Yegorov.

In 1905, Spiridonov in the rank of second lieutenant went to the Russian-Japanese War, fought in the cavalry reconnaissance. He was awarded the Order of Saint Anna of the third class and the Order of Saint Stanislaus with a sword and a bow.

Since 1906, Spiridonov carried away fashionable then in Europe "jiu-jitsu", which he studied for unreleased then in Russia and in Europe, benefits and self-instruction.

At the rank Spiridonov met senior pupil, schoolgirl, and a merchant's daughter Claudia Chistova, who began to help in his high-school classes. It was at this time that he received the order for a transfer to the third Siberian Reserve Infantry Regiment Nerchinsk. In order not to be separated from his future wife, he sacrificed a career: resigned, having lost the right to get the next rank. A few months later, he again entered the service, but in the military unit, which was based not far from its restriction – in the 238th Klyazminskoe reserve battalion, formed more by Peter I.

In the First World War Spiridonov from the first day it proved to be at the front. He was seriously wounded, he spent a year in the hospital, after which he was "dismissed from the service with the production of the next rank and awarded the uniform and pensions of a soldier.

== Years of revolution and civil war ==
The revolution has deprived the retired Stabskapitän, even that little officer's pension which he received. He had odd jobs, and once he was briefly arrested. In 1919 he became an accountant in the main armor control of the Red Army.

With the improvement of health Spiridonov again began to return to sports attachments. In March 1918 in Moscow took place Vsevobuch "weightlifting" (this term is then understood lifting weights, French struggle, English boxing, tug of war, "the cast of gravity", "throwing light stone" and "pushing the stone"); Spiridonov has to preserve the unique photos of participants and organizers of this championship, which sits on a place of honor. At the same time he was a member of the Moscow Imperial River Yacht-Club, the head of the school of Jiu-Jitsu on the preparation of the police trainers at the Main Department of the workers 'and peasants' militia, teaching sports disciplines in one of the railway organizations Vsevobuch and became head of the Moscow District courses sports instructors pre-conscription training of Comrade Lenin, where then there was the subject of "protection and attack without weapons

== Dynamo ==
At the beginning of 1923 in Moscow it was established Dynamo Sports Club, which was among the founders and Viktor Spiridonov, organized with the "Dynamo" section of offense and defense. His first group consisted of 14 people, so to attract their studies as much as possible to the people and to interest young people, Spiridonov went in the circus before the Red Army and told a lecture and did some demonstration performances. The speech was a great success: the circus was packed.

In just a few years Spiridonov managed to produce a galaxy of instructors. At the same time he published three books, sets out the basic principles of self-defense system developed by him: "Manual of self-defense without a weapon in Jiu-Jitsu System" (1927), "Self-defense without weapons. Training and competitions" (1928) and "Self-defense without weapons. Fundamentals of self-defense. Training. Methods of Study" (1933). Advocating the case of self-defense, Spiridonov traveled all over the Soviet Union. Section self-defense began to function not only in Moscow but also in many other organizations Dynamo.

His application of purely fighting clothing that Spiridonov cultivated as a departmental sport, which was closed to outsiders. So when in 1928 in Moscow at the time of the All-Union Games, Spiridonov suggested that guests from Germany, who came with performances on "Jiu-Jitsu" (it was called judo in Europe) to hold a friendly match with his disciples, they quietly agreed; to the surprise of the German guests, students Spiridonov had taught won two of three fights.

In February 1929 the first championship of the Moscow "Dynamo" was held to teach Spiridonov the kind of struggle in the clothes referred to initially just "self-defense", then as a tribute to fashion while reductions, began to call the "system" itself" and subsequently appeared under the name samoz.

== Last years of life ==
At the turn of 1930–40 supervisor Spiridonov in the "Dynamo" was a principled opponent of his system, and his own. Spiridonov had to leave "voluntarily".

Since the beginning of the Great Patriotic War, Spiridonov began teaching unarmed combat fighters separate motorized rifle brigade of special purpose NKVD on a special training base in suburban Mytischi.

Spiridonov was a heavy smoker, and by the end of his life he was diagnosed with cancer of the lungs. He was discharged from hospital as a hopeless case, and he died at home, in severe agony, but with courage. He died 7 September 1944, and is buried at the Vagankovo Cemetery.

== Post mortem ==
The tomb of Victor Spiridonov was for many years considered lost. In early 2012, members of the NP "Nekropolists Association Non-Commercial Partnership " found the grave of Spiridonov in poor condition. In the summer of 2012 it was decided to bring the grave in order and to erect a monument. The grand opening of the monument took place on 20 December 2012.

In December 2020, a memorial created by the founders of Sambo martial art Viktor Spiridonov, Vasili Oshchepkov and Anatoly Kharlampiev was erected at Luzhniki Olympic Complex.

== Legacy ==
In the 2023 biographical feature film Legends of Sambo, Spiridonov was portrayed by Dmitry Pavlenko.

== Bibliography ==
- Лукашев М. Н. Система САМ превращается в САМБО. — М.: «Будо-Спорт», 2003 г. — 104 с., ил. ISBN 5-901826-07-8. Третья книга из пятитомника «Рукопашный бой в России в первой половине XX
