= Judas (2013 film) =

- Directed by: Andrey Bogatyrev
- Written by: Vsevolod Benigsen; Leonid Andreyev
- Produced by: Tatyana Voronetskaya
- Starring: Aleksey Shevchenkov; Sergey Frolov; Andrey Barilo; Ivan Dobronravov; Olga Stashkevich
- Cinematography: Dmitry Maltsev
- Music by: Sergey Solovyov; Dmitry Kurlandsky
- Production company: ABS
- Release date: 2013
- Running time: 108 minutes
- Country: Russia
- Language: Russian

Judas (Russian: Иуда, romanized: Iuda) is a 2013 Russian drama film directed by Andrey Bogatyrev. It is the director’s second feature-length film and was produced by the company ABS, with Tatyana Voronetskaya serving as producer.

The film was screened in the main competition at the 35th Moscow International Film Festival. Actor Aleksey Shevchenkov, who played the title role, won the Silver Saint George Award for Best Actor at the festival.

== Plot ==
The film is an adaptation of the novella Judas Iscariot by Russian writer Leonid Andreyev. It presents a dramatic interpretation of the relationship between Jesus Christ and his apostles, focusing on Judas Iscariot—a thief who becomes the most infamous traitor in history.

== Cast ==
- Aleksey Shevchenkov as Judas Iscariot
- Sergey Frolov as Thomas
- Andrey Barilo as Jesus Christ
- Ivan Dobronravov as Matthew
- Olga Stashkevich as Mary Magdalene
- Aleksey Bochenin as John the Apostle
- Konstantin Samoukov as Peter
- Vadim Yakovlev as Annas
- Olga Aksyonova as a courtesan
- Maksim Dugishov as Bartholomew
- Andrey Bogatyrev as a basket maker
- Andrey Kopytov as Andrew
- Sergey Fetisov as Pontius Pilate

== Production ==
Filming took place on the island of Malta. The film’s visual style emphasizes austerity and psychological tension, reflecting the philosophical themes of Andreyev’s original work.

== Music ==
The score was composed by Sergey Solovyov and contemporary composer Dmitry Kurlandsky.

== Reception ==
Judas was selected for the main competition of the 35th Moscow International Film Festival, where it received critical attention primarily for its lead performance and its unconventional portrayal of biblical events.

== Awards ==
- Silver Saint George Award for Best Actor – Aleksey Shevchenkov (35th Moscow International Film Festival)
