= Others (TV series) =

- Genre: Fantasy; drama
- Written by: Elena Voitovich
- Directed by: Vladimir Raksha
- Starring: Irina Martynenko; Wolfgang Cerny; Ilya Malanin
- Composer: Ryan Otter
- No. of seasons: 1
- No. of episodes: 6

Production
- Producers: Alexandra Remizova; Dmitry Nelidov; Olga Filipuk; Mikhail Kitaev; Andrey Reznik
- Running time: 50 minutes
- Production companies: Luna Park; Plus Studio

Original release
- Network: Kinopoisk
- Release: January 25 – February 22, 2024

Others (Russian: Иные, romanized: Inye) is a 2024 Russian adventure fantasy miniseries directed by Vladimir Raksha about people with supernatural abilities. The project was produced by the film company Lunapark and Plus Studio.

The premiere of the first two episodes took place in the Kinopoisk platform on January 25, 2024. New episodes were posted weekly on Thursdays.

== Plot ==
Anna Smolina lives in Leningrad in the 1940s. In the city center, a girl suddenly throws away a truck and a tram with the power of her mind to prevent the death of her only brother Peter. A supernatural force awakens in Anna, which she has not yet learned to control. Soon, state security agencies, led by a young investigator Ivan Likholetov, and a mysterious foreigner, Maximilian Neumann, begin to hunt for the girl.

== Cast ==
- Irina Martynenko Anna Smolina (voice by Yulia Khlynina) the "other"
- Ilya Malanin Ivan Likholetov investigator
- Wolfgang Cerny Herr Maximilian Neumann (voice by Maksim Matveyev)
- Linda Lapins Fraulein Katharina Kruger Neumann's assistant
- Alexey Serebryakov Professor Alexander Ivanovich Ilyinsky
- Yevgeniya Simonova Professor Lyubov Vladimirovna
- Nikolai Fomenko Leonid Vasilyevich Petrov Vera’s father, Likholetov’s boss and father-in-law
- Kirill Nagiev Smerchev commander of detachment "M"

== Production ==
Production of the series took three years. Filming took place in 27 locations around the world. In addition to Russia, the film crew visited Romania, Germany, Turkey, and some details were additionally filmed in the UK. The bulk of the location shooting took place on the Vuoksi river on the border with Finland, as well as near Vyborg and Karelia.

The series was first officially announced on September 15, 2023 at the presentation of new works from the Kinopoisk online streaming platform.

In September 2023, Bookmate released the novel Others by Alexandra Yakovleva, based on the script by Elena Voitovich. The soundtrack for the audio version was recorded by the group "AIGEL", and the book itself was voiced by a member of the group Aigel Gaisina.

Bubble Comics released a comic book dedicated to the premiere of the series.
