= Andrey Bogatyrev =

Andrey Andreyevich Bogatyrev
- Андрей Андреевич Богатырёв
- Born: January 15, 1985 (age 41); Russia
- Occupations: Film director, screenwriter, producer, actor, composer, editor
- Years active: 2003–present
- Known for: Bagi, Judas, The Red Ghost

Andrey Andreyevich Bogatyrev (Russian: Андрей Андреевич Богатырёв) is a Russian film director, screenwriter, producer, actor, composer, and film editor. He is also the founder and leader of the rock band tOt.

== Career ==
Bogatyrev entered the Gerasimov Institute of Cinematography (VGIK) in 2003, studying non-fiction film directing under Efim Reznikov and Boris Karadzhev. In 2005, he won a VGIK International Film Festival award for his student work, cited “For the search for a contemporary hero.”

He graduated from VGIK in 2007. His diploma film screened at more than ten international film festivals. After graduation, he worked at the film company Rossfilm, directing television documentaries including Portents – Messages from the Future, To Do Good: The Curse of the Derviz Family, Evdokia – The Last Russian Tsarina, and Nanoworld.

From 2007 to 2010, Bogatyrev was one of the organizers of the international film festival East & West and directed its opening and closing ceremonies.

In 2009, he founded the rock band tOt, which recorded the soundtrack and released the single “1 on 1” for the feature film Friday. 12. That same year, he established the production company ABS, focusing on music videos and documentary films.

In 2011, Bogatyrev directed his feature film debut Bagi (2011). The film won Best Debut at the Vancouver International Film Festival and received a Special Jury Mention at the 33rd Moscow International Film Festival (Perspectives competition). Bogatyrev served as director, co-writer, editor, composer (with Mikhail Pushkov and Vitaly Klart), and appeared in a small acting role.

His next major feature was Judas, based on the novella Judas Iscariot by Leonid Andreyev.

In 2014, he directed the second season of the sitcom SashaTanya and a music video for the song “Cosmos Ahead” by the rock band Torba-na-Kruche.

In 2015, Bogatyrev studied at the Academy of Theatre and Film Arts under Nikita Mikhalkov, where he directed a short film as part of the cycle About War.

In 2018, he began production on the war western The Red Ghost, serving as director, producer, and creator. He also completed the sports drama Wild League. He later directed the biographical sports film Legends of Sambo, set in the 1930s and based on the lives of Vasili Oshchepkov, Viktor Spiridonov, and Anatoly Kharlampiyev.

== Personal life ==
Bogatyrev was previously married to actress Olga Stashkevich; their divorce was announced in 2018. In 2024, he married publicist Diana Kadi.

== Selected filmography ==
=== Director ===
- Bagi (2011)
- Judas (2013)
- SashaTanya (2015, TV series)
- White Nights (2015)
- Wild League (2019)
- The Red Ghost (2021)
- Legends of Sambo (2023)
- Gold of Umalta (2024)

=== Actor ===
- League of Deceived Wives (2005)
- Bagi (2011)
- Judas (2013)
- White Nights (2015)
- Legends of Sambo (2023)

== Awards ==
- 2005 – VGIK International Film Festival, “For the search for a contemporary hero”
- 2011 – 33rd Moscow International Film Festival, Special Jury Mention (Bagi)
- 2011 – Vancouver International Film Festival, Best Debut (Bagi)
- 2014 – 35th Moscow International Film Festival, Best Russian Film (Judas)
- 2020 – BRICS Film Festival (MIFF), Special Jury Prize (The Red Ghost)
- 2021 – X Moscow International Film Festival “Let’s Live”, Best Director (The Red Ghost)
