= Nuremberg (2023 film) =

- Theatrical release poster
- Directed by: Nikolai Lebedev
- Screenplay by: Nikolai Lebedev; Alexander Zvyagintsev
- Based on: Forever and Eternal by Alexander Zvyagintsev
- Produced by: Elmira Aynulova; Maria Zhuromskaya; Arkady Fateev; Ilya Vasiliev; Maria Mikhailova; Katerina Ulrikhova; Steffen Wild; Anton Neichel; Svetlana Giks
- Starring: Sergey Kempo; Lyubov Aksyonova; Yevgeny Mironov; Sergei Bezrukov; Aleksey Bardukov; Igor Petrenko; Wolfgang Cerny; Christian Harting
- Cinematography: Irek Hartowicz
- Edited by: Helios Chuchka
- Music by: Eduard Artemyev
- Production companies: Cinema Production Producer Center; Gazprom-Media Holding on its 25th anniversary; Kadr-Media; Ministry of Culture; Russian Historical Association; VTB Bank (Public Joint-Stock Company); Transneft (Public Joint-Stock Company); TASS; Russian Radio
- Distributed by: National Media Group Film Distribution
- Release dates: February 20, 2023 (Four Seasons Hotel Moscow); March 2, 2023 (Russia)
- Running time: 131 minutes
- Country: Russia
- Languages: Russian, German, English
- Budget: ₽674.3 million; $7.4 million
- Box office: ₽334.5 million; $3.6 million

Nuremberg (Russian: Нюрнберг) is a 2023 Russian historical drama film written and directed by Nikolai Lebedev about the Nuremberg trials. The script was based on the book Forever and Eternal by Alexander Zvyagintsev.

Nuremberg premiered at the Four Seasons Hotel Moscow in Moscow on February 20, 2023, and was theatrically released in the Russian Federation on March 2, 2023, by National Media Group Film Distribution.

== Plot ==
The action takes place six months after the surrender of Germany, when the trial of Nazi criminals begins.

Soviet scout-translator Captain Igor Volgin receives letters from his artist brother Nikolai, who had been missing since 1942. The letters were addressed to his mother, who died in besieged Leningrad. The letters were sent from Nuremberg, which is in the American zone of occupation of Germany. Igor Volgin, taking advantage of the need for translators to be present as part of the Soviet delegation at the Nuremberg trials, traveled to Nuremberg to search for his brother. At this time, the surviving fascist underground is trying to prevent the Nuremberg process; a traitor officer from the Soviet delegation takes part in it. Igor Volgin gets acquainted with a Russian girl, Lena, who was taken away during the war to work in Germany and, after liberation, is recruited by the fascist underground. Igor Volgin takes part in operations to seize the German archive and delivery to the process from Moscow witness — Field Marshal General Friedrich Paulus. Both operations reach the stage of failure because of the traitor officer in the Soviet delegation. The leader of the Nazi underground in Nuremberg, former SS officer Helmut "Hammer" with his detachment tries to release or kill the defendants; but his agent Lena, having fallen in love with Soviet officer Igor Volgin, informs Igor of this danger. In the end, an operation involving the SS men who escaped from American captivity fails.

At the end of the film, it is reported that Elzy, who became the adopted daughter of Igor and Elena Volgin and left with them for Leningrad, found the burial place of Volgin's brother, Nikolai, near Nuremberg. The film contains not only show court hearings, but also shootouts, scenes with explosions, and at the end — newsreel footage.

== Cast ==
- Sergey Kempo as Captain Igor Volgin / his brother Nikolai Volgin
- Lyubov Aksyonova as Lena
- Yevgeny Mironov as Colonel Migachyov, commander of the Soviet delegation
- Sergei Bezrukov as the chief prosecutor from the Soviet Union, General Roman Andreyevich Rudenko
- Aleksey Bardukov as Senior Lieutenant Zaitsev, a member of the Soviet delegation
- Igor Petrenko as Major Bablenkov
- Alain Blazevic as Paulus
- Wolfgang Cerny as Helmut "Hammer"
- Laura Bach as Greta
- Klaus Schindler as Sigmund
- Christian Harting as Hans Frank

=== Other cast ===
- Joachim Paul Assböck as Ulrich Brandhoff
- Zurab Kipshidze as Orbeli
- Aleksandr Kakhun as Chief Justice Geoffrey Lawrence, 1st Baron Oaksey
- Valery Myznikov as British judge Norman Birkett, 1st Baron Birkett
- Aleksey Popov as American judge Francis Biddle
- Igor Afanasyev as an assistant to the chief prosecutor from the Soviet Union, Nikolai Dmitrievich Zorya
- Aleksandr Pakhomov as a representative of the Soviet Union at the tribunal, Iona Timofeevich Nikitchenko
- Georges Devdariani as the chief prosecutor from the United States, Robert Houghwout Jackson
- Mikhail Bondin as Yevgeny Ananyevich Khaldei, a photographer

== Production ==
=== Development ===
The project was announced at the end of 2018 by the then Russian Minister of Culture Vladimir Medinsky. Elmira Aynulova was chosen as the producer.

In 2019 the film's script was changed. This, as well as the involvement of foreign actors and the need to film abroad, led to an increase in the cost of the project: Prime Minister Dmitry Medvedev approved the allocation of an additional 200 million rubles from the state reserve fund. Konstantin Khabensky, Nikita Mikhalkov, Oliver Stone were considered as candidates for directors, but in the end Nikolai Lebedev became the director.

=== Filming locations ===
Principal photography was supposed to begin in the spring of 2020 in the Czech Republic. They were postponed due to the coronavirus pandemic and began in April 2021 in Prague and continued in June at Mosfilm.

For the filming of the film at Mosfilm, the courtroom of the Nuremberg Palace of Justice was recreated in life-size (330 square meters). The decoration complex “Hall 600” was transferred to the Moscow Patriot Park as a museum exhibit for use in historical and educational work with visitors.

== Release ==
Initially, the premiere of the film was scheduled for 2021 later it was postponed to November 24, 2022, and then to February 23, 2023. As a result, the National Media Group Film Distribution company released the film on March 2, 2023.

The television premiere of the film took place on May 9, 2023, at 11:00 on NTV, TV-3, Pyatnitsa! and TNT channels.

== See also ==
- Nuremberg, a 2025 American film by director James Vanderbilt, also starring Wolfgang Cerny.
