= Moscow Imperial River Yacht-Club =

The Moscow Imperial River Yacht-Club was a Russian sports organisation founded in 1867. In 1889, the Club published the Manual of Rowing and Sailing with Application to Swimming, the second rowing manual published in Russia. The building that once housed the club was restored and reopened in 2014.
