= Sambo (martial art) =

Soviet martial art

Sambo Russian: сaмбо
- International Federation of Amateur Sambo
- Also known as: Sombo (in English-speaking countries)
- Focus: Hybrid
- Country of origin: Soviet Union
- Date of formation: 1920
- Famous practitioners: List of practitioners
- Ancestor arts: Greco-Roman wrestling, Judo, Gulesh, Trântă, Savate, Dagestanian national wrestling, Jujutsu, Mongolian wrestling, Shuai jiao, Kokh, Hapsagai (Siberian Wrestling), Chidaoba
- Olympic sport: No, but IOC recognized
- Official website: International SAMBO Federation

Sambo
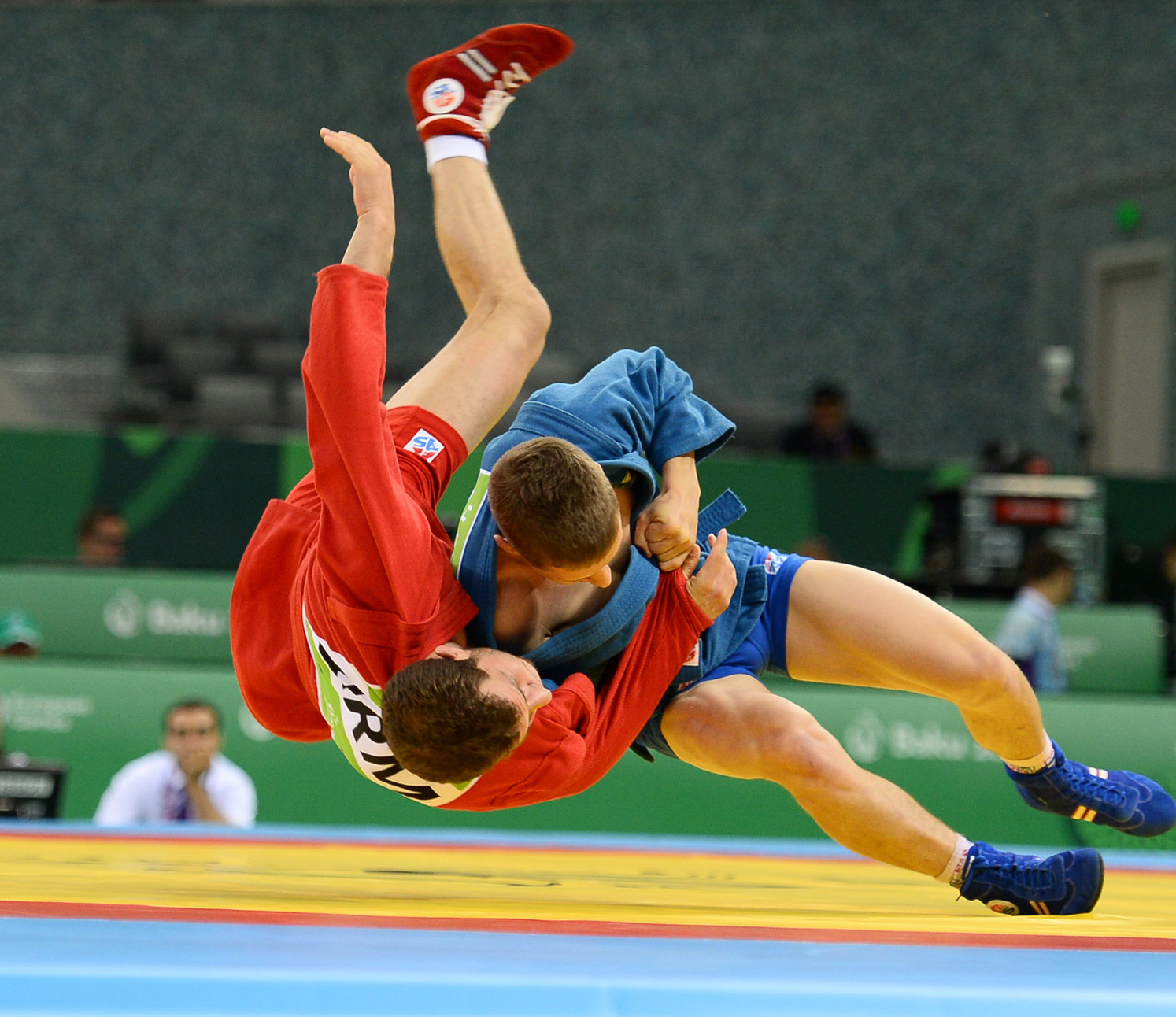
- Sambo at the 2015 European Games
- Highest governing body: Fédération Internationale de Sambo
- Registered as a sport discipline: Soviet Union, 16 November 1938 (Goskomsport)

Characteristics
- Contact: Yes
- Mixed-sex: No
- Type: Martial art
- Equipment: Sambovka

Presence
- Country or region: Worldwide
- Olympic: No
- World Games: 1985, 1993, 2025

Sambo is a martial art with Soviet origins, an internationally practised combat sport, and a recognized style of amateur wrestling included by UWW in the World Wrestling Championships along with Greco-Roman wrestling and freestyle wrestling.

== Etymology ==
It originated in the Russian SFSR of the Soviet Union during the 1920s. The word sambo is an acronym of samozashchita bez oruzhiya (Russian: самозащита без оружия), which literally translates to 'self-defence without weapons'.

Sambo is a martial art and combat sport developed and used by the Soviet Red Army in the early 1920s to improve their hand-to-hand combat abilities. The sport incorporates various styles of wrestling and other self-defence systems such as kick-boxing and fencing.

Soviet martial arts expert Vasili Oshchepkov is credited as one of the founding fathers. Viktor Spiridonov, a military officer with background in several different styles of wrestling spanning across the Soviet Union, is also considered an important founding member of sambo.

Spiridonov and Oshchepkov independently developed two different styles, which eventually cross-pollinated and became what is known as sambo.

== Origins ==
Sambo is relatively modern since its development began in the early 1920s by the Red Army and other forces to improve hand-to-hand combat abilities of their servicemen. It was intended to merge the most effective techniques of other martial arts.

The pioneers of sambo were Viktor Spiridonov and Vasili Oshchepkov. Both were trained military men with access to frequent state-sponsored travel opportunities where they were able to experience various local wrestling styles and add new techniques to their arsenal. Oshchepkov even spent several years living in Japan and training in judo under its founder Kano Jigoro. Oshchepkov died in prison as a result of the Great Purge after being accused of being a Japanese spy, and judo was banned in the USSR for decades until the 1964 Olympics, where sambists won four bronze medals.

Both men were trained military officers with backgrounds in several styles of combat wrestling that were prevalent in different regions of the Russian Empire (later the Soviet Union) and abroad. Combining these styles together with the popular international style of catch-as-catch can wrestling (known as "free wrestling" in Russian at the time) and Japanese judo wrestling, their respective styles gradually morphed into a new style of wrestling that was more suitable for the Soviet military's hand-to-hand combat needs.

Compared to Oshchepkov's system of "free wrestling" in Russia, Spiridonov's style was softer, less brutal, and less strength-dependent, which was in large part was due to the injuries Spiridonov sustained during World War I.

Anatoly Kharlampiev, a student of Vasili Oshchepkov, is also considered a founder of sambo. On 16 November 1938, it was recognized as an official sport when the USSR All-Union Sports Committee issued resolution no. 633.

== Styles ==
There are multiple competitive sport variations of sambo (though sambo techniques and principles can be applied to many other combat sports). Below are the main formats that are recognized by FIAS.

=== Sport sambo ===
Sport sambo
- Also known as: Sambo wrestling
- Focus: Wrestling
- Hardness: Full-contact
- Country of origin: Russia
- Famous practitioners: List of practitioners
- Parenthood: Greco-Roman wrestling, Judo, Gulesh, Trântă, Dagestanian national wrestling, Jujutsu, Mongolian wrestling, Shuai jiao, Kokh, Hapsagai (Siberian Wrestling), Chidaoba
- Descendant arts: Brazilian jiu-jitsu, MMA
- Olympic sport: No, but IOC recognized

Sport sambo or Sambo wrestling (Russian: Борьбa Самбо, romanized: Bor Ba Sambo, lit. 'Sambo Wrestling') is stylistically similar to pre-World War I catch wrestling and judo; and in a lot of ways influenced by them in rules and protocols. The competition uniforms (called "kurtka") mimic clothing used in wrestling tournaments popular amongst the peasantry of the Caucasus region in the Soviet Union, with a few added elements from judo wrestling outfits prevalent at the time. The competition colors (red and blue), shoes, and circular ring have direct lineages from the internationally popular style of catch wrestling. Sambo also allows various types of leg locks while not allowing chokeholds, akin to rulesets that were widely used in pre-World War I catch wrestling tournaments. Similarly to its parent styles, it also places emphasis on throwing, ground control, riding, pinning, and escapes as well as submissions, with very few restrictions on gripping and holds.

Sambo is an international style of amateur wrestling recognized by the FILA (now UWW) Congress in 1966.

=== Combat sambo ===
Combat sambo
- Focus: Hybrid, striking, wrestling, self-defense
- Hardness: Full-contact
- Country of origin: Russia
- Famous practitioners: List of practitioners
- Parenthood: Greco-Roman wrestling, Judo, Gulesh, Trântă, Savate, Dagestanian national wrestling, Jujutsu, Mongolian wrestling, Shuai jiao, Kokh, Hapsagai (Siberian Wrestling), Chidaoba
- Descendant arts: MMA
- Olympic sport: No, but IOC recognized

Combat sambo (Russian: боевое самбо, romanized: boyevoye sambo) is used and was developed for the military, including forms of striking and wrestling. Combat sambo allows regular punches, kicks, elbows, and knees, as well as soccer kicks, headbutts, and groin strikes, in addition to throws, holds, chokes, and joint locks (leg locks such as knee bars, heel hooks, and toe holds), except for a standing or flying wristbar. The chief distinction from sambo wrestling is that striking techniques are fully allowed. In terms of aliveness, combat sambo surpasses ARB by design, though both were designed for combat situations only.

Competitors wear jackets as in sport sambo, but also hand protection and sometimes shin protection and headgear.

The first FIAS World Combat Sambo Championships were held in 2001. The World Combat Sambo Federation, based in Russia, also sanctions international combat sambo events. Combat sambo is designed to tackle certain tasks. The effectiveness of this martial art is determined by its structure, namely by three components: boxing, sambo, and adapters. Adapters of combat sambo were developed by the academician G. S. Popov. The task of adapters is to ensure the safe transition from middle distance to close one, as well as the consistent usage of sambo and boxing techniques. The given configuration provides the fusion of two martial arts into a single system.

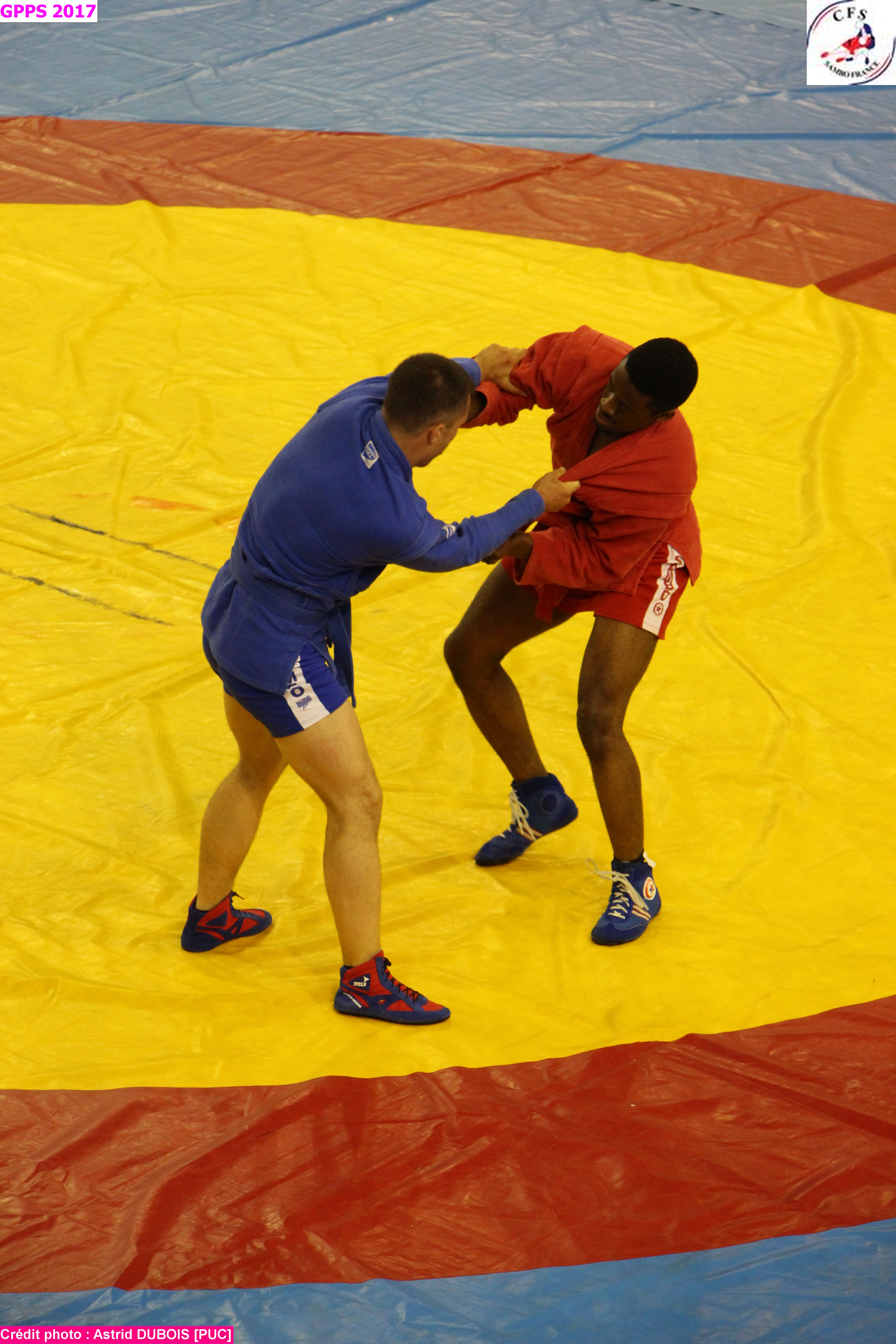

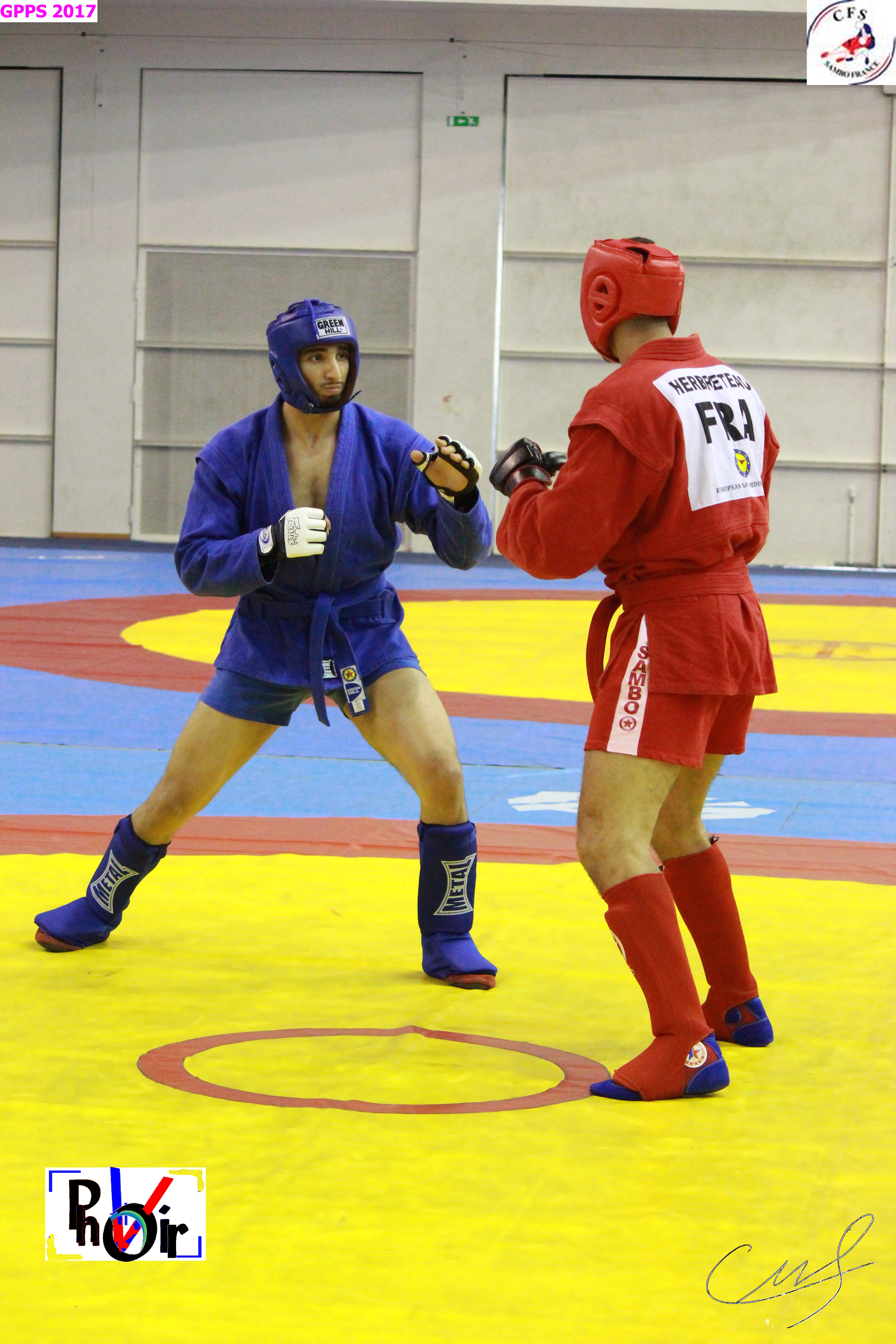

Both sambo wrestling (left) and combat sambo competitions require sambovka jacket and shirts as a uniform, and held at a standard wrestling mat. However, combat sambo competitions also require gloves, headgear, mouthpiece, groin, and shin protection equipment to minimize injuries.

Women participated in combat sambo for the first time in an official tournament in the Paris Grand Prix 2015. The first recognized instance of women competing in an international combat Sambo tournament was in the 2022 Asian and Oceania Sambo Championships. In 2022, Australia and New Zealand competed for the first time in the Asian sambo championship.

=== Self-defense sambo ===
This kind of sambo is about defending oneself. In it, practitioners are taught to guard against weapons. Most of the moves that are taught include using the attacker's aggression against them, which is similar to what is done in both jiu-jitsu and aikido. Spiridonov's influence is strong in this style of sambo.

=== Concrete sambo ===
This type of sambo was developed for the Argentinian Army during the military dictatorship. It is similar to special sambo in terms of origin and uses.

=== Special sambo ===
This type of sambo was made for Army Special Forces and other rapid response forces. It is only designed for the particular group that uses it. In that sense, it's similar to sambo combat, which is also designed for a specific purpose.

=== FCF-MMA ===
This was developed in 2003 as a form of sambo without competing in the traditional uniform of kurtka (jacket), shorts and boots. Competitors wear only fight shorts and gloves. One competitor wears blue and the other red, the same as traditional sambo. Matches are held on a traditional wrestling mat, not in a cage or ring like normal MMA fights. Techniques from all martial arts are used to defeat an opponent by knock out, submission or point victory.

=== Freestyle sambo ===
This type of sambo was introduced by the American Sambo Association in 2004. Its purpose was to encourage practitioners of non-sambo martial arts such as judo and jiu-jitsu to participate in sambo. Freestyle sambo allows the use of chokeholds and other submission techniques that are not used in sambo wrestling.

=== Beach sambo ===
Sambo beach, as the name suggests, is held on soft beaches or strips of sand. It was officially introduced as an international discipline by the International SAMBO Federation in 2010s.

== History ==
=== Origins and influences ===
Vasili Oschepkov was one of the first foreigners to learn judo in Japan and had earned his Nidan (second-degree black belt, out of then five) from judo's founder, Kano Jigoro. Spiridonov's background involved indigenous martial arts from various Soviet regions as well as an interest in Japanese jujutsu (though he never formally trained in it). His reliance on movement over strength was in part because during World War I, he received a bayonet wound which left his left arm lame. Both Oschepkov and Spiridonov independently hoped that Soviet military hand-to-hand combat techniques could be improved with an infusion of the techniques distilled from other foreign martial arts. Contrary to common lore, Oschepkov and Spiridonov did not cooperate on the development of their hand-to-hand systems. Rather, their independent notions of hand-to-hand combat merged through cross-training between students and formulating efforts by their students and military staff. While Oschepkov and Spiridonov did have occasions to collaborate, their efforts were not completely united.

Each technique was carefully dissected and considered for its merits, and if found acceptable in unarmed combat, refined to reach sambo's ultimate goal: to stop an armed or unarmed adversary in the least time possible. Thus, many techniques from jujutsu, judo, and other martial systems joined with the indigenous fighting styles to form the sambo repertoire. When the techniques were perfected, they were woven into sambo applications for personal self-defence, police, crowd control, border guards, secret police, dignitary protection, psychiatric hospital staff, military, and commandos.

=== Development ===
In 1918, Lenin created Vsevobuch (General Military Training) under the leadership of N. I. Podvoyskiy to train the Red Army. The task of developing and organizing Red Army military hand-to-hand combat training fell to K. Voroshilov, who in turn, created the NKVD physical training centre, Dynamo.

Spiridonov was a combat veteran of World War I and one of the first wrestling and self-defence instructors hired for Dynamo. His background included free wrestling (i.e. catch wrestling), Graeco-Roman wrestling, many Turkic folk wrestling styles, and Japanese jujutsu. As a combative investigator for Dynamo, he travelled to Mongolia and China to observe their native fighting styles.

In 1923, Oschepkov and Spiridinov collaborated (independently) with a team of other experts on a grant from the Soviet government to improve the Red Army's hand-to-hand combat system. Spiridonov had envisioned integrating the most practical aspects of the world's fighting systems into one comprehensive style that could adapt to any threat. Oschepkov had observed Kano Jigoro's distillation of tenjin shin'yō-ryū, kitō-ryū and fusen-ryū jujutsu into judo, and he had developed the insight required to evaluate and integrate combative techniques into a new system. Their developments were supplemented by Anatoly Kharlampiyev and I. V. Vasiliev who also travelled the globe to study the native fighting arts of the world. Ten years in the making, their catalogue of techniques was instrumental in formulating the early framework of the art to be eventually referred to as sambo.

Kharlampiyev is often called the "father of sambo". This may be more legend than fact, since he only had the longevity and political connections to remain with the art while the new system was named "sambo". However, Kharlampiyev's political manoeuvring is single-handedly responsible for the USSR Committee of Sport's accepting sambo as the official combat sport of the Soviet Union in 1938 – decidedly the "birth" of sambo. So, more accurately, Kharlampiyev could be considered the father of "sport" sambo.

Spiridonov was the first to begin referring to the new system with a name similar to 'sambo'. He eventually developed a softer style called samoz that could be used by smaller, weaker practitioners or even wounded soldiers and secret agents. Spiridonov's inspiration to develop samoz stemmed from his World War I bayonet injury, which greatly restricted his left arm and thus his ability to practise wrestling. Refined versions of sambo are still used today or fused with specific sambo applications to meet the needs of Russian commandos.

=== Running up to an Olympic sport status ===
After being recognized by FILA (known since September 2014 as United World Wrestling) in 1968, by the U.S. National Amateur Athletic Union in 1972, and after being included to the programme of the 1973 World Wrestling Championships along with Graeco-Roman and Freestyle wrestling (which are indeed Olympic sports,) sambo was rapidly making its way to become an Olympic sport.

The first World Cup was contested in 1969. Don Curtis, a member of the U.S. Olympic Wrestling Committee, had predicted in 1975, that the Russians would introduce sambo wrestling in the 1980 Olympics programme in Moscow. In 1975 the first United States National Sambo Championships were held in Mesa, Arizona, in 1977. It was contested along with G.R. and Freestyle at the first Pan American Wrestling Championships in Mexico City, and included in the schedule of the upcoming 1983 U.S. Olympic Festival and the 1983 Pan American Games (the 1983 Pan American event in Caracas became the first and subsequently the last edition of sambo at the Pan American Games.) In 1979 the National AAU Sambo Committee established several annual awards to honour outstanding persons in the sport of sambo wrestling. By the 1980s it has been included to Pan American Games, National Sports Festival and AAU Junior Olympics programme.

But as a result of political complications of the 1980 Olympic boycott which arose after the Soviet invasion of Afghanistan, sambo was at first reduced to a demonstration sport at the 1980 Summer Olympics in Moscow, USSR. But later, because of the sport's strong association with the Soviet Union, it was removed from demonstration sport status. It is true that youth sambo was demonstrated in the Games' opening ceremonies; however, sambo was never formally recognized as a demonstration sport. This common error in history books is noted in several sources including From SAMOZ to SAMBO by Anatoly Makovetskii and Lukashev's History of Hand-to-Hand Combat in the First Half of the 20th Century: Founders and Authors. Furthermore, the official documents of the 1980 Olympic Organizing Committee do not mention sambo as a participating sport in the Games. Nevertheless, Jerry Matsumoto, Head of the U.S. Sambo Association, saw in 1990 sambo becoming an Olympic sport, at least at the demonstration level, within the next eight years.

=== Today ===
In 1968, FILA accepted sambo as the third style of international wrestling. In 1985, the sambo community formed its own organization, Federation International Amateur Sambo (FIAS). In 1993, FIAS split into two organizations, both of which used the same name and logo, and the two groups were often referred to as FIAS "East" (under Russian control) and FIAS "West" (under US and Western European control). This split mirrored the last days of Cold War politics of the time as well as the recent break-up of the Soviet Union. In the U.S., disagreements between the sport's organizers and the rise of Brazilian jiu-jitsu in the 1990s slowed down the growth of sambo before the success of several sambo fighters increased its popularity a decade later. In 2005, FILA reached an agreement with FIAS "West" and re-assumed sanctioning over sport sambo. However, in 2008, FILA again discontinued sanctioning sambo and sambo is now notably missing from the UWW website. At present, only FIAS sanctions international competition in sport sambo. In 2014 FIAS and FILA signed a cooperative agreement. While this does not place sambo back on UWW's recognized list, it does move towards unity and prevents future 'turf wars' regarding the sport's promotion. A similar agreement was signed by FIAS and the International Judo Federation in 2014 as well. Both FIAS and the World Combat Sambo Federation host international combat sambo competition. The American Sambo Association has continued to host freestyle sambo tournaments in the US and Canada since 2004. These events are unrecognized by UWW. Rumours rising in 2012 stating that sambo will be included as a demonstration sport in the 2016 Olympics are therefore not supported by any facts, and thus sambo is still a very long way from maturing into an Olympic sport, notwithstanding the effort that is being put into the matter. Indeed, given the intention of the Olympic Committee to remove classic wrestling from the Olympic roster, there are rumours that sambo is highly unlikely to ever make it to the Olympics. However, sambo has been included in the 27th Annual Summer Universiade for the first time in history. FIAS submitted an application to the International Olympic Committee (IOC) to consider sambo for the 2020 Games and has devoted 2010–2013 to creating a sambo commission in the International Sports Press Association (AIPS). As of 30 November 2018, sambo has indeed received temporary recognition by the IOC. This close relationship is reestablishing the global popularity and media emphasis on sambo.

== Uniform and ranking ==
Similar to wrestling, a sambo practitioner normally wears either a red or a blue competition outfit. The kurtka (Russian: куртка), also called a sambovka (Russian: самбовка), similar to the keikogi in style and function, although it is tighter fitting and has epaulettes and belt loops as well as shoulder straps, wrestling-style shorts, and special protective shoes called bortsovki that match the uniform's colour. The sambo uniform does not reflect rank or competitive rating. Sport rules require an athlete to have both red and blue sets to visually distinguish competitors on the mat.

Also similar to the wrestling ranking system used in Russia, a competitive rating system is used (rather than the belt colour ranking system used in judo and gendai jujutsu). Various sport organizations distribute these ranks for high levels of competition achievement or in some cases coaching merits. People who have earned these ranks are known as 'Masters of Sport.' Institutions that grant a sambo 'Master of Sport' in Russia include FIAS, FKE, and the International Combat Sambo Federation. Other nations have governing bodies that award 'Masters of Sport' as well, including the American Sambo Association in the United States.

== Competitions ==
=== FIAS World Cup ===
The Sambo World Cup and Supercup have been contested since 1969, initially held by FILA, and since 1985 by FIAS.

=== United States National Sambo Championships ===
United States National Sambo Championships, known initially as the National AAU Sambo Wrestling Championships, are the annual championships held in the United States. American enthusiasts of martial arts took up sambo shortly before it was contested at the 1973 World Wrestling Championships and was rapidly making its way to becoming an Olympic sport in 1980.

=== Sambo at the National Wrestling Championships ===
The national sambo competition also was held along with Graeco-Roman and freestyle events at the 1987 and 1988 AAU/USA Grand National Wrestling Championships on July 1, 1987, and July 6, 1988, respectively, both held at Market Square Arena in Indianapolis, Indiana. The next year it was contested at the 1989 AAU/Carrier Grand National Wrestling Championships on July 5 at Metra in Billings, Montana. 1990 AAU Grand National Wrestling Championships also hosted a national sambo competition at Market Square Arena in Indianapolis, Indiana, on July 10. 1992 AAU Grand National edition hosted a national sambo competition in July in Amarillo, Texas. 1994 AAU Grand National Wrestling Championships also hosted a national sambo competition at Kellogg Arena in Battle Creek, Michigan, on July 13. 1995 AAU Grand National edition hosted a national sambo competition in Tulsa, Oklahoma. The 1999 AAU Grand National Wrestling Championships also offered Sambo to competitors on June 30 at Metra in Billings, Montana. The 2002 AAU Grand National Wrestling Championships saw Sambo competition on June 19 at Hirsch Coliseum in Shreveport, Louisiana.

USA Wrestling has added sambo as a style since the 2007 U.S. National Wrestling Championships in Las Vegas, Nevada.

== See also ==
- Bartitsu
- Judo
- Krav maga
- Legends of Sambo, a 2023 biographical film about the creation of sambo
- Savate

== Sources ==
- FILA Sombo Rules – May 2006
- Sombo – A Style of Wrestling
- Creation of Sambo – by Michail Lukashev, first published in Physical Culture and Sport magazine N9-10/91.
- Classical SAMBO – with many examples and pictures.
- About Sombo – sambo overview at AnyMartialArt.org
- CST Magazine Interview with Steve Koepfer from the American Sambo Association – information about combat and Freestyle sambo.
- New York Times Article and Video covering the history of sambo – published 19 July 2008.
- LA Talk Radio's Kip Brown discusses sambo on In The Can – Aired 13 September 2008.
- G4 Network's Attack of the Show covers sambo Aired 1 October 2008.
- Russia Today covers the 70th Anniversary of Sambo on YouTube – Aired 22 October 2008
- Slate.com covers sambo training in Russia, the 2008 FIAS World Championships, and Fedor Emilianenko – published 23–27 February 2009
- Injury shake up unearths political controversy at USA SAMBO Open Published 3 May 2010
- https://olympics.com/ioc/recognised-international-federations
