= Wild League (water polo) =

Amateur water polo competition

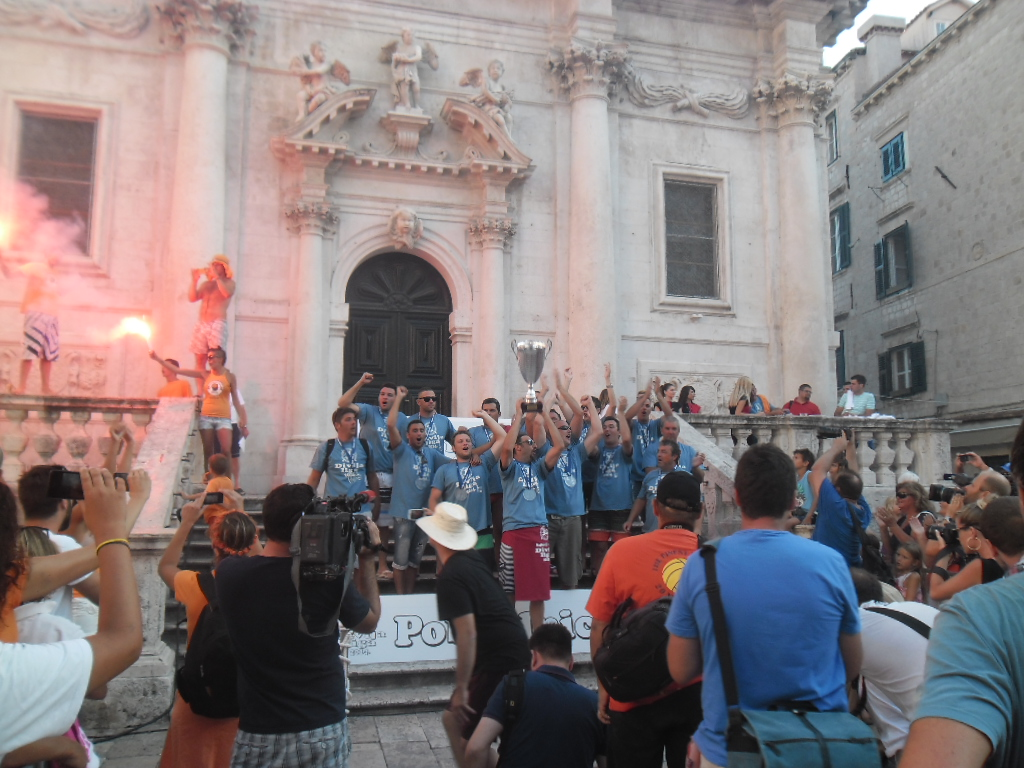
Fun H2O Mlini celebrates Wild League title 2014

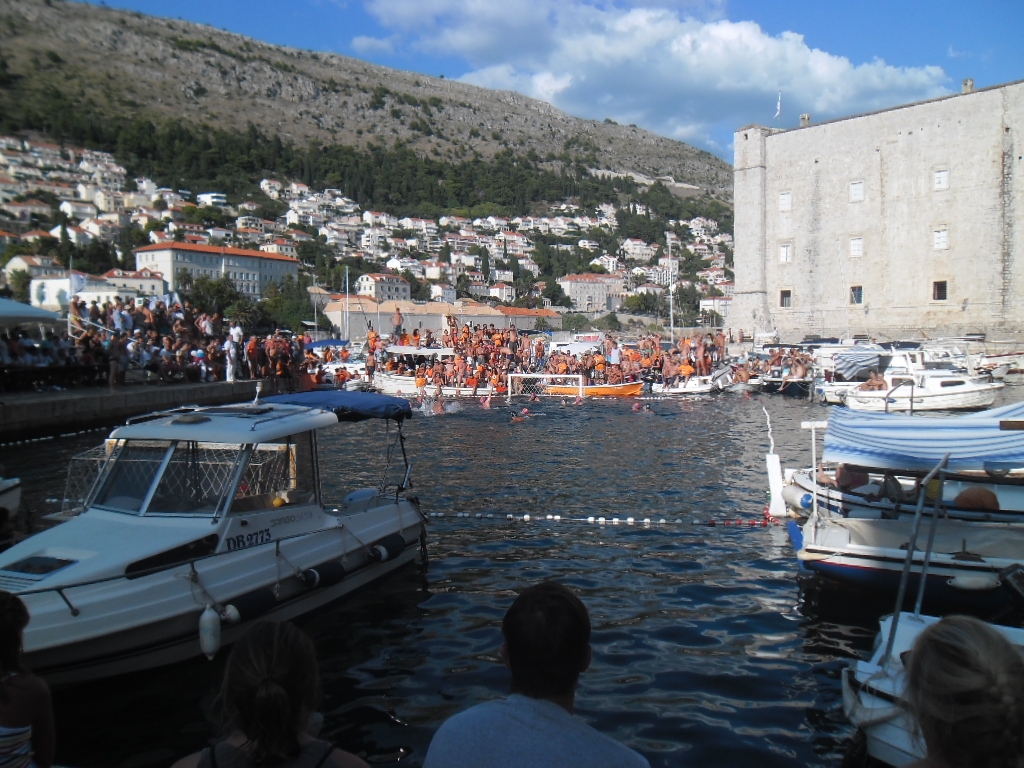
Final match in Porat on August 17, 2014

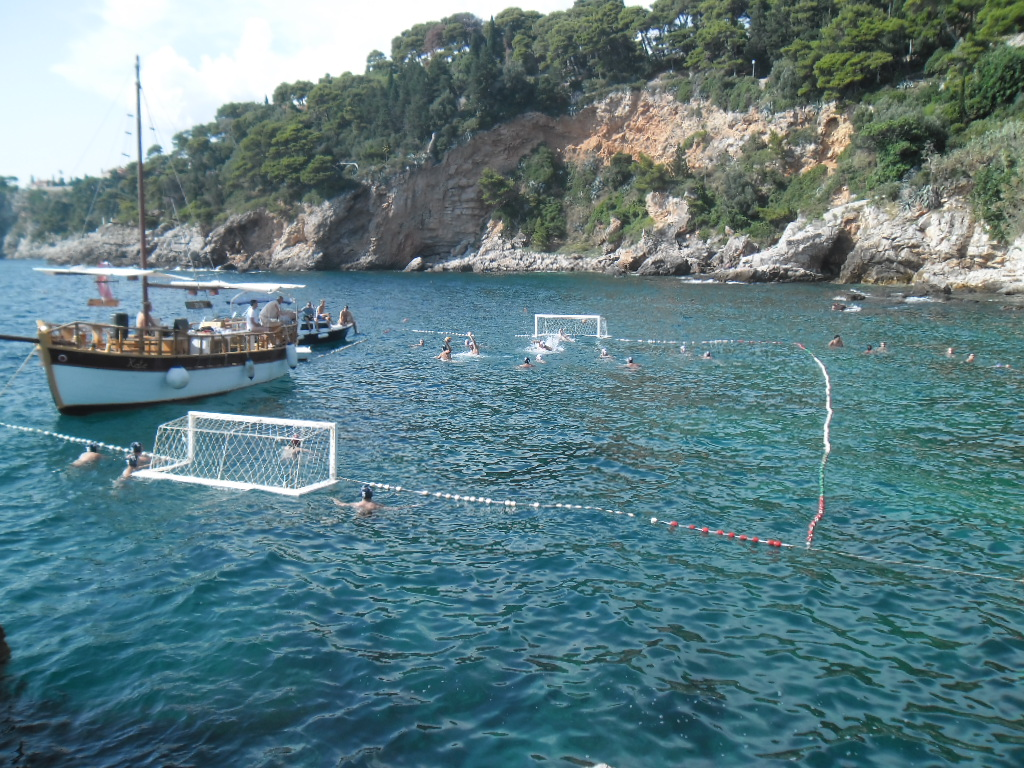
Wild League match on Danče Beach

Wild League (Croatian: Divlja liga) in Croatia is the most popular amateur water polo competition in the world. Matches are played on the beaches of Dubrovnik including Porporela, Danče, Bellevue, Šulić, and other beaches in the Riviera. The final match, however, happens in Porat (Old Town port) every year. Referees are professional (they have FINA and LEN licences). Better teams usually play people who have been trained in Jug and have been good in younger categories. Mihovil Španja, a Croatian professional swimmer, won the 2010 Wild League. Coaches of Solitudo are players of Croatia men's national water polo team, namely, Nikša Dobud, Pavo Marković, and Tihomil Vranješ. In 2007, the coach of Porporela was a player of the national team Andro Bušlje.

Wild League was not played in 2020 and 2021 due to COVID-19 pandemic.

== Winners ==
Year	Champion	Finalist	Third
1950	Porporela		
1959	Piplić		
1983	Bellevue 73	Porporela	Elita
1984	Danče	Montovjerna	Porporela
1985	Danče	Porporela	OŠK Mali (Bellevue)
1986	Čingrija	Danče	Porporela
1987	Student	Danče	Porporela
1988	Copacabana	Danče	Roxy
1989	Roxy	Copacabana	Porporela
1990	Gjivovići Dolphins	Copacabana	Porporela
1991	Copacabana	Danče	Montovjerna
1993			Danče
1994	Roxy	Danče	Copacabana
1995			
1996	KIKS 04	Danče	Fun H2O Mlini
1997	KIKS 04	Copacabana	Elita
1998	Copacabana	KIKS 04	Elita
1999	Bellevue '90	Danče	Penatur
2000	KIKS 04	Bellevue '90	Elita
2001	KIKS 04	Elita	Špilja '94 Danče
2002	Špilja '94 Danče	KIKS 04	Elita
2003	Montovjerna	Copacabana	Porporela
2004	Copacabana	Montovjerna	Penatur
2005	Montovjerna	Copacabana	Penatur
2006	Palace	Penatur	Čingrija
2007	Porporela	Čingrija	Solitudo
2008	Solitudo	Penatur	Porporela
2009	Solitudo	Čingrija	Copacabana
2010	Penatur	Solitudo	Špilja '94 Danče
2011	Špilja '94 Danče	Kamen Mali Cavtat	Solitudo
2012	Montovjerna	Solitudo	Penatur
2013	Kamen Mali Cavtat	Fun H2O Mlini	Solitudo
2014	Fun H2O Mlini	Palace	Špilja '94 Danče
2015	Kamen Mali Cavtat	Penatur	Palace
2016	Elita	Fun H2O Mlini	Penatur
2017	Fun H2O Mlini	Elita	Kamen Mali Cavtat
2018	Elita	Porporela	Kokoti
2019	Kamen Mali Cavtat	Fun H2O Mlini	Elita
2020			
2021			
2022	Kokoti	FUN H2O Mlini	Porporela
2023	Porporela	Kokoti	PVG Gruški mul
2024	FUN H2O Mlini	Porporela	Kokoti
2025	FUN H2O Mlini	Elita	Kokoti
2026	FUN H2O Mlini	Porporela	Plaža Bellevue

Team	Gold	Silver	Bronze	Total
Fun H2O Mlini	5	4	1	10
Copacabana	4	4	1	9
KIKS 04	4	2	0	6
Porporela	3	5	8	16
Kamen Mali Cavtat	3	1	1	5
Montovjerna	3	1	1	5
Danče	2	7	1	10
Elita	2	3	6	11
Solitudo	2	2	2	6
Čingrija	2	2	1	5
Špilja '94 Danče	2	0	2	4
Roxy	2	0	1	3
Penatur	1	3	4	8
Kokoti	1	1	3	5
Palace	1	1	1	3
Bellevue '90	1	1	0	2
Gjivovići Doplhins	1	0	0	1
Student	1	0	0	1
Piplić	1	0	0	1
Plaža Bellevue	0	0	1	1
PVG Gruški mul	0	0	1	1
OŠK Mali (Bellevue)	0	0	1	1

Notes

1. Čingrija 1983 played with name Bellevue '73.
2. 1993 final match was stopped due to players fighting.
3. Reference http://www.divljaliga.hr/?page=povijest

=== Final matches ===
- 1983: Belevue '73 - Porporela 7:5
- 1984: Danče - Montovjerna 8:5
- 1985: Danče - Porporela 11:8
- 1986: Čingrija - Danče 11:5
- 1987: Student - Danče 4:3
- 1988: Copacabana - Danče 8:6
- 1989: Roxy - Copacabana 11:9
- 1990: Gjivovići Dolphins - Copacabana 12:11
- 1991: Copacabana - Danče 6:5
- 1994: Roxy - Danče 9:8
- 1996: KIKS 04 - Danče 8:7
- 1997: KIKS 04 - Copacabana 11:9
- 1998: Copacabana - KIKS 04 9:4
- 1999: Bellevue '90 - Danče 5:4
- 2000: KIKS 04 - Bellevue '90 7:4
- 2001: KIKS 04 - Elita 9:4
- 2002: Špilja '94 Danče - KIKS 04 8:7
- 2003: Montovjerna - Copacabana 7:5
- 2004: Copacabana - Montovjerna 5:3
- 2005: Montovjerna - Copacabana 8:1
- 2006: Palace - Penatur 8:7 (after penalties)
- 2007: Porporela - Čingrija 7:4
- 2008: Solitudo - Penatur 8:7
- 2009: Solitudo - Čingrija 5:2
- 2010: Penatur - Solitudo 8:6
- 2011: Špilja '94 Danče - Kamen Mali Cavtat 7:5
- 2012: Solitudo - Montovjerna 6:7
- 2013: Fun H2O Mlini - Kamen Mali Cavtat 5:6
- 2014: Palace - Fun H2O Mlini 3:3, 5:6 (penalties)
- 2015: Kamen Mali Cavtat - Penatur 5:4
- 2016: Elita - Fun H2O Mlini 13:3
- 2017: Elita - Fun H2O Mlini 5:6
- 2018: Elita - Porporela 8:8, 10:9 (penalties)
- 2019: Kamen Mali Cavtat - Fun H2O Mlini 7:7, 2:1 (penalties)
- 2022: Kokoti - FUN H2O Mlini 7:4
- 2023: Porporela - Kokoti 6:5
- 2024: FUN H2O Mlini - Porporela 7:5
- 2025: FUN H2O Mlini - Elita 11:6
- 2026: FUN H2O Mlini - Porporela 9:8
