= Anatoly Kharlampiyev =

Russian wrestling and martial arts researcher

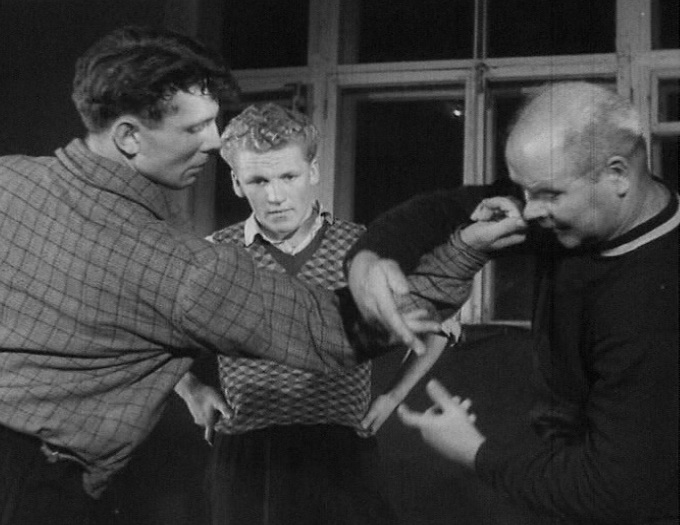
- Training self-defense techniques, 1957, Moscow Power Engineering Institute
- Born: Anatoly Arkadyevich Kharlampiyev; 29 October 1906; Smolensk, Russian Empire
- Died: 16 April 1979 (aged 72); Moscow, Soviet Union
- Nationality: Russian
- Style: Sambo
- Teacher: Vasili Oshchepkov
- Rank: Merited Master of Sports of the USSR

Anatoly Arkadyevich Kharlampiyev (Russian: Анато́лий Арка́дьевич Харла́мпиев; 29 October 1906 – 16 April 1979), was a Russian researcher of various kinds of national wrestling and martial arts, Merited Master of Sports of the USSR, and Honored Coach of Sports of the USSR. He was one of the founders of Sambo, a martial art technique developed in the Soviet Union (his predecessors in the creation of Sambo were Viktor Afanasyevich Spiridonov and Vasily Sergeyevich Oshchepkov). Kharlampiyev worked as a physical education trainer at the Communist University of the Toilers of the East, and also was a student of boxing, fencing, acrobatics, and mountaineering. In 1938, Kharlampiyev presented Sambo to the USSR All-Union Sports Committee, which recognized the martial art as an official sport.

== Biography ==
Kharlampiyev's grandfather, Georgy Yakovlevich Kharlampiyev, was a gymnast and boxer. For many years, he collected, studied, and classified various techniques of hand-to-hand combat and self-defense.

Kharlampiyev's father, Arkady Georgievich Kharlampiyev (1888–1936), graduated with honors from the Imperial Academy of Arts and was sent to Paris at the state's expense to continue his studies. After a while, due to lack of funds to continue his studies, he began to fight in a professional European boxing ring. He soon became the champion of France, and then Europe (in the absolute category). After that he returned to Russia to begin making boxing popular. He was considered one of the founders of the Russian boxing school.

From his early childhood, Kharlampiyev was trained by his grandfather and father. At the age of six, he acted in a group of aerial acrobats in a circus. By 16, he had already become a versatile athlete and a well-trained wrestler and boxer.

== Sambo ==
Kharlampiyev dedicated his life to the creation and development of a new application martial arts – Sambo. At the beginning of 1920, he began to collect and systemize national games containing methods of combat, and in 1934 to describe and classify sports and fighting techniques. In 1936, he graduated from the Russian State University of Physical Education, Sport, Youth and Tourism (Department of Judo directed by Vasili Oshchepkov).

Starting in 1935, Kharlampiyev led judo training at the Moscow Palace of Sports, known as the "Wings of the Soviets". From 1945 to 1952, he worked as the senior manager of the Central "Dynamo" Council. From 1953 on, he was associate professor of the Department of Physical Education (in Moscow Power Engineering Institute).

Kharlampiyev created the Sambo system including a sports subsystem (which is the foundation). Sambo is commonly practiced by the Soviet, and later Russian, militaries (which was seen as the target application). The sport subsystem eventually became known as Sambo Wrestling (or simply Sambo), and the combat form as Combat Sambo.

By creating the system of Sambo, Anatoly Kharlampiyev carefully studied judo and mastered it in practice (under the direction of Vasili Oshchepkov). In the Sambo system, he saw a new kind of martial arts, enriched with the most effective techniques of other kinds of combat.

During his years as physical training instructor at the Communist University of the Toilers of the East (TAS) and the International Society of red stadium builders (OSMKS), Kharlampiyev continued to study different kinds of martial arts.

Comprehension of the essence of the struggle (both science and art) assisted learning techniques and tactics of fights from outstanding fighters (Ivan Poddubny, Klimenty Buhl et al.).

For a number of years Kharlampiyev traveled to the Central Asian and Caucasus republics for the study of national kinds of combat. He studied and systematized techniques and training methods. He took part in the competitions. With a body weight of 72 kg, he sometimes beat heavyweights. The 1983 film Invincible was based on these journeys, and the character "Andrei Khromov" was based on Kharlampiyev. His role was played by Andrei Rostotsky.

== World War II ==
The development of a new kind of wrestling was halted by World War II when Anatoly Kharlampiyev volunteered and was sent to the front in the Red Army on July 7, 1941. Since September 1941 he was with the 18th Infantry Division of the Leningradsky district of Moscow.

== After the war ==
After the war, Anatoly Kharlampiyev stepped up his activities on the development and spreading of a new kind of wrestling. Since 1947, the holding of the USSR championships continued.

In 1947, the Second All-Union gathering of trainers was held on the initiative of Kharlampiyev. During this conference it was decided that the new kind of combat wrestling, cultivated in the Soviet Union would be called Sambo (abbr. from the "self-defense without weapons"). At the same assembly, it was decided to create a Federation of Sambo.

Sambo competitions became a regular occurrence in the cities, regions and republics of the Soviet Union. Anatoly Kharlampiyev began publication of educational materials for Sambo. Sports and educational work with young people and security forces in the sections Sambo, which was held by Anatoly Arkadyevich (head coach of the "Krylia Sovetov" Sports Society; senior coach of the "Dynamo" Sports Society (1945–1952, Moscow) and his companions, rapidly increased the number of Sambo wrestlers in the USSR.

In those years, Anatoly Kharlampiyev may have been one of the most prolific Sambo coaches.

In 1953, Kharlampiyev became associate professor of Moscow Power Engineering Institute (MPEI). Since that time, Sambo began to spread to universities in Moscow and other cities of the USSR.

== Death ==
Kharlampiyev died on April 16, 1979.

== Legacy ==
The first All-Union tournament in Sambo in memory of Anatoly Kharlampiyev was held in Moscow's universal gym "Friendship" on 10–11 October 1980. Since 1982, these events have become international.

In the 2023 biographical feature film Legends of Sambo, Kharlampiyev was portrayed by Anton Vohmin.
