= Vasili Oshchepkov =

Russian martial artist (1893–1937)

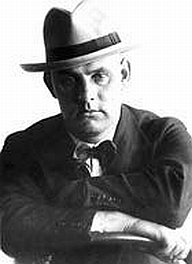
- Oschchepkov in 1912
- Born: Vasili Sergeyevich Oshchepkov; 7 January 1893; Sakhalin, Russian Empire
- Died: 10 October 1937 (aged 44); Butyrka Prison, Russian SFSR, Soviet Union
- Nationality: Russian
- Style: Sambo
- Teacher: Kanō Jigorō
- Rank: Merited Master of Sports of the USSR; 2nd dan Judo

Other information
- Spouse: Ekaterina Zhuravleva; Maria Grigorievna (second wife); Anna Ivanovna (third wife)
- Notable students: Anatoly Kharlampiyev

Vasili Sergeyevich Oshchepkov (Russian: Васи́лий Серге́евич Още́пков; January 7, 1893 - October 10, 1937) was a Russian and Soviet researcher of different types of national wrestling and martial arts. He was ranked as a Merited Master of Sports of the USSR and an Honored Coach of the USSR. He was one of the founders of Sambo, a martial art developed in the Soviet Union. During the Great Purge, Oshchepkov was arrested in 1937 and accused of being a Japanese spy; he was executed in prison as a result.

== Early life ==
Very little is known about Vasili Oshchepkov's earlier life before adulthood. However, he became an orphan by the age of eight.

== Education at the Kodokan ==
After the transfer of South Sakhalin to the Japanese in 1905 under the Treaty of Portsmouth, Vasily who remained a complete orphan in 1904 came to the attention of the Russian Orthodox mission in Japan. He was sent to study on the island of Honshu in Japan, where he first studied from September 1907 at a seminary in Kyoto, where only clergymen were trained. There he became interested in judo and, in the direction of a judo teacher from the seminary, was admitted to the Kodokan and transferred to the Tokyo Theological Seminary at the Orthodox Mission, organized by the future St. Nicholas of Japan. In the seminary he studied judo, and, on the recommendation of the coach as the best judoka at the seminary, Vasily was admitted to the entrance examinations and admitted to the Kodokan Judo Institute in Tokyo, founded by Jigoro Kano, on October 29, 1911.

On June 15, 1913, Oshchepkov received the first degree black belt - shodan. in October 1917, during a trip to Japan, he passed the exams to receive his second degree black belt, becoming the first Russian and the third European to get a nidan in judo. Ranks in judo did not go to tenth degree, as now, but only five.

== Work in intelligence ==
After finishing seminary in 1913, he returned to Russia and worked as a translator in counterintelligence, first as a Zaamurskogo border guard in Harbin, then in the Department of Counterintelligence at Vladivostok Fortress, Amur Military District, in Vladivostok. In 1914, he founded Russia's first judo school and held the world's first international judo competition held in 1915. He repeatedly went on business trips to Japan and in 1918 he taught judo to police in Vladivostok.

In 1919 he worked for the Siberian Army and in the Japanese Office of Military Field Communications as an interpreter. During this period he, through a colleague, fellow countryman and fellow student at the Tokyo Seminary Trofim Yurkevich, established a connection with the Communist Party of the Soviet Union. At the same time, Oshchepkov tried to earn money: he opened a Japanese language school, participated in trade operations with Japan, and even bought a film projector

In 1921, Oshchepkov returned to Japan under the guise of a film distributor, as the owner of houses in Aleksandrovsk inherited from his father. Since 1920, all of Sakhalin had been occupied by Japanese troops, and this opened up prospects for intelligence activities, since under Japanese law a film distributor was obliged to organize discounted screenings for military personnel. His reports to the USSR had important practical significance, distinguished by their completeness and detail.

In 1924, his superiors proposed that he move to South Sakhalin, but Oshchepkov made a counter-proposal to continue his intelligence activities in Tokyo, which was approved, and in October he departed for Harbin, and from there via Kobe to Tokyo. In Harbin, he met and quickly married his compatriot Maria.

In Tokyo, Oshchepkov organized a functioning intelligence network; however, due to disagreements with his superiors, he had to return to the USSR in 1926, where he was accused of embezzling state funds. To compensate for 3,140 yen spent on agents but unsupported by receipts, he had to sell off almost all of his personal property, including his film projector.

== Work in the Siberian military district ==
The headquarters of the Siberian Military District did not intend to lose a highly qualified Japanologist, and V. S. Oshchepkov was retained in Vladivostok as a translator. On January 27, 1927, by order No. 26 of the Revolutionary Military Council of the USSR, "Oshchepkov Vasily Sergeevich is assigned to service in the Red Army (RKKA)." Then, on this basis, "by order to the troops of the Siberian Military District No. 19," V. S. Oshchepkov "is appointed to the position of translator of the 7th branch of the District Headquarters" in Novosibirsk, with the appointment being backdated to April 15, 1926, including the payment of all monetary allowances due for this period.

Practically all of V. S. Oshchepkov's funds went towards treating his sick wife. He began trying to secure a transfer to Moscow or Leningrad, where he could ensure more effective medical care and have a higher salary, for which he tried to convince the military authorities of the prospects of using judo in military training. As a result, in September 1929, his efforts were successful, and he was summoned to Moscow. His wife had already passed away by this time

== Popularization of judo in the USSR and the creation of Sambo ==
In 1914, immediately after his arrival in Russia, Oshchepkov organized a Judo club in Vladivostok, operating at 21 Korabelnaya Embankment Street (now the Pacific Fleet sports club), about which an article appeared in the capital's magazine "Hercules" in June 1915. In 1917, the first ever widely advertised international judo match took place in Vladivostok: V. S. Oshchepkov's students competed with students from the Japanese Higher Commercial School of Otaru, who had come to Vladivostok; a similar international match was also held in 1915

In 1927, in Novosibirsk, at a meeting of the Osoaviakhim cell at the headquarters of the Siberian Military District, Oshchepkov gave a talk about judo, after which it was immediately decided to organize a club for staff members to study self-defense techniques. The local Dynamo society also rushed to take advantage of the rare specialist's services.

Immediately after his transfer to Moscow, V. S. Oshchepkov opened two-month "jiu-do" (the spelling of that time) courses at the Central House of the Red Army (CDKA). Following the first demonstrative performances at the CDKA, two groups of military personnel and Army House workers were immediately created, as well as the first women's group in the country

In 1929, Oshchepkov became a teacher at the State Central Institute of Physical Culture (Infizkult). Working at the Institute of Physical Education gave Oshchepkov a unique opportunity to familiarize himself with the wrestling systems of the peoples of the USSR, whose representatives studied under him at the department. He analyzed bayonet combat, international martial arts, Chinese wushu, and a variety of national wrestling styles in terms of their applicability in combat. Oshchepkov's developments eventually merged into a more advanced applied system, sambo (self-defense without weapons), which enthusiasts were working to create during those years.

In 1930, with the direct participation of Oshchepkov, the "Manual on Physical Training of the Red Army" was prepared and published, and in 1931, the methodological guide "Physical Exercises of the Red Army," where for the first time in the country, a comprehensive hand-to-hand combat training program was outlined. Parallel to the publication of methodological materials, V. S. Oshchepkov conducted special courses for the commanding staff of the Moscow Garrison, and then expanded his work in the instructor-methodological bureau under the Moscow Garrison Committee; he directly taught hand-to-hand combat in several military units himself, and also took part in the bayonet combat competitions of the commanding staff of the Moscow Garrison, winning first place there.

In 1931, the physical culture complex "Ready for Labor and Defense of the USSR" (GTO USSR) was developed in the USSR. In 1932, the second stage of the GTO complex was established, in which self-defense techniques appeared as one of the standards. The development of the set of techniques for GTO-II, on behalf of a special commission chaired by S. S. Kamenev, was carried out precisely by V. S. Oshchepkov

In 1930, based at the CDKA but through the USSR Sports Committee, Oshchepkov conducted special instructor courses, at which physical education teachers from a wide variety of regions across the country received training. Among them was Alexander Rubanchik from Rostov-on-Don, who served in the military, and on whose initiative Oshchepkov held demonstrative performances at the Central Higher School of Militia, in which, aside from himself, the entire graduating class of the courses participated. The demonstration was a tremendous success, after which Oshchepkov was immediately invited to teach at this premier educational institution of the military. In addition to the mandatory hand-to-hand combat course, Oshchepkov began leading club activities at the Central Higher School of Military (TsVShM), which also continued at the military faculty of Infizkult. Oshchepkov's training program and club classes at TsVShM were liquidated in 1934 at the demand of Spiridonov, who stated that it contradicted his own officially approved program.

In 1932, a military faculty was established at Infizkult. The teaching of hand-to-hand combat and grappling in clothes, both at the faculty and at the courses organized under it, was also carried out by Oshchepkov. In 1933–1934, he also taught students at the two-year N. M. Shvernik Trade Union School. In 1934, Vasily Sergeevich created his own section in the newly built Aviakhim Sports Palace, which he handed over in 1935, due to illness, to his student, an intern from Infizkult, A. A. Kharlampiev. In the summer of 1937, V. S. Oshchepkov managed to secure the opening of a judo specialization at the Higher School of Coaches organized at Infizkult.

== Arrest and death ==
On the night of 1 to 2 October 1937, Oschchepkov was arrested. He died in the Butyrka prison, officially of a heart attack on October 10. In reality he was accused of being a Japanese spy and ten days after his arrest he was shot for his "fraternization with Japanese imperialists.” In 1957, thanks to the efforts of Oshchepkov's widow, Anna Ivanovna, he was rehabilitated and cleared of any wrongdoing

== Personal life ==
Oshchepkov was married three times. He divorced his first wife Ekaterina Zhuravleva in 1924. He fell in love with an 18-year old countrywoman Maria Grigorievna from Alexandrovsk, who lived at that time in the same city. At 22, Maria died of tuberculosis. Later, Oshchepkov married Anna Ivanovna Kazembek.

In his later years, Oshchepkov began to struggle with health problems. Oshchepkov's pupils noted that he never showed himself naked. Some have concluded that he was concealing some skin disease. Trainee Kharlampiev and Oshchepkova AA Budzinskaya said that he was at the home of the teacher at the beginning of 1937 in an alley Medvedev. According to him, "Vasily Sergeyevich lying on the bed and I was sick, he has tormented heart disease, and he never parted with nitroglycerin.

== Legacy ==
In the 2000s in various regions of Russia were organized clubs and tournaments Sambo memory Oshchepkova, including the All-Russian youth tournament in combat sambo in memory of Vasili Oshchepkov, including the Russian youth tournament in combat sambo named after Vasili Oshchepkov. During the meeting, the Board of the APEC in Vladivostok in September 2012, he was laid monument master.

In order to promote sambo in Russia and the world, as well as the formation of images in the public mind the heroes of the Fatherland on the example of the life and mission of St. Basil Oshchepkova and other worthy devotees on the initiative of a number of sports and public organizations in Russia, he launched a project named Vasili Oshchepkova project.

On September 9, 2012, the 120th anniversary of Oshchepkov's birthday was celebrated in Vladivostok's sports center, with participation of judokas from Japan and Russia.

In October, 2014, the World Sambo Championships were held for the first time in Japan where Oshchevpkov had learned judo.

In September, 2016, at Eastern Economic Forum in Vladivostok, Premier Abe of Japan, emphasizing the Russo-Japanese friendship, mentioned in his address: "I hope to visit the 21 Korabelnaya Embankment where, as Mr. Putin would know well, Vasili Oshchepkov opened the first judo school in Russia."

On September 24, 2016, the sculpture by Peter Chegadayev of Vasili Oshchepkov receiving a black belt from Jigoro Kano, entitled "Fighting Tiger Cubs", was unveiled at the place where Oshchepkov had opened the first judo school in Russia.

== In film ==
In the 2023 biographical feature film Legends of Sambo, Wolfgang Cerny portrays Oschepkov.

== Bibliography ==
- Куланов, А. Е. (2011). "Василий Ощепков: путь из ниоткуда в никуда". Япония наших дней. Vol. 1. Москва: ИДВ РАН. pp. 85–101.
- Лукашев М. Н. Сотворение самбо: родиться в царской тюрьме и умереть в сталинской. — М.: «Будо-Спорт», 2003. — 104 с. — ISBN 5-901826-02-7.
