= Wild League (film) =

2019 Russian sports drama film

- Film poster
- Russian: Дикая лига
- Directed by: Andrey Bogatyrev; Art Camacho
- Written by: Roman Vladykin; Igor Dobrovolsky; Dmitry Minchyonok
- Produced by: Igor Dobrovolsky; Olga Ledyaeva; Eric Brenner; Barry De Vorzon; Alexander Nevsky; Yuliya Perkul
- Starring: Vladimir Yaglych; Adelina Gizatullina; Ivan Okhlobystin; Dmitry Nazarov; Evgeniy Koryakovskiy; Olesya Sudzilovskaya; Adrian Paul
- Cinematography: Ken Blakey; Vyacheslav Krasakov
- Edited by: Robert A. Ferretti
- Music by: Sean Murray
- Production companies: Marins Group Union; Modern Age Productions
- Distributed by: Kinoland
- Release date: October 24, 2019 (Russia)
- Running time: 111 minutes
- Countries: Russia, United States
- Language: Russian

Wild League (Russian: Дикая лига, romanized: Dikaya liga) is a 2019 Russian historical sports drama film directed by Andrey Bogatyrev and Art Camacho. It is based on real events of the beginning of 20th century and the appearance of football in the Russian Empire. The brave barge hauler Varlam is being trained at an English football club and, together with the merchant-patriot Balashov, is creating the first national team in Russia, co-directed by Andrey Bogatyrev and Art Camacho.

Unusual sports on the basis of real events of the early twentieth century, Wild League has assembled an international acting team, which included Vladimir Yaglych, Adelina Gizatullina, Ivan Okhlobystin, Dmitry Nazarov, Evgeniy Koryakovskiy, Olesya Sudzilovskaya and Adrian Paul. It was released in the Russian Federation by Kinoland on October 24, 2019.

== Plot ==
Nizhny Novgorod Governorate, Russian Empire in 1909 year.

Based upon the real-life events of the 1910s, the story is about a man from the lowest social strata who, in order to be with his beloved woman, had to leave his native land and start his life anew in Moscow. After proving himself in a battle, he was noticed by an Englishman who owned a closed soccer club and invited him to try out for the team. However, soccer is presented as an aristocratic game and the team did not accept a barge-hauler from the Volga. He then gathered people with whom he created the Wild League, consisting of street teams from Moscow. He became a leader, changing his life and the lives of people surrounding him. The character Varlamy replaced folk fun - battles of "wall against the wall", in which ordinary people perished - with soccer. They are then challenged by the soccer lawmakers.

== Cast ==
- Vladimir Yaglych as barge hauler Varlam (a burlak)
- Adelina Gizatullina as Malika
- Ivan Okhlobystin as Yasha
- Dmitry Nazarov as Rodion Balashov
- Evgeniy Koryakovskiy as Satan
- Olesya Sudzilovskaya as Alice
- Adrian Paul as James Parker
- Hafedh Dkhlaoui as Alexander
- William Shockley as Jones
- Stanislav Tikunov as Prince Mikhail
- Anton Kolesnikov as cheater Shnyr
- Aleksandr Davydov as pinch Volk
- Denis Kuznetsov as bouncer Penza
- Pavel Abramenkov as thimble Yorsh
- Nikolay Shrayber as clown athlete Karp
- Mihail Melin as clown Polycarp
- Anatoliy Gushchin as Filimon
- Ivan Mikhailovskiy as Michael
- Vyacheslav Shikhaleev as Will
- Vilen Babichev as russian fist fighter

=== Cameos ===
- Artem Dzyuba
- Roman Zobnin

== Production ==
The original screenplay was written by Roman Vladykin. The idea to make a film about the origin of football in Russia came to him in 2015. When Vladykin finished the script, he sent him to a contest at the Cinema Foundation of Russia, where he eventually won. After a while, the production company "New Time" bought out this scenario.

They started shooting the film at the end of 2016. The picture was shot in Moscow Oblast, the village of Gorki Leninskiye, the city of Yaroslavl, the city of Kostroma and territory of the Krasnodar Krai.
