= The Red Ghost =

- Theatrical release poster
- Directed by: Andrey Bogatyrev
- Written by: Andrey Bogatyrev; Vyacheslav Shikhaleev; Pavel Abramenkov
- Produced by: Tatyana Voronetskaya; Andrey Bogatyrev; Konstantin Elkin; Oleg Tumanov; Elvira Dmitrievskaya; Yelena Belova; Alexey Petrukhin (ru)
- Starring: Aleksey Shevchenkov; Vladimir Gostyukhin; Yura Borisov; Polina Chernyshova; Wolfgang Cerny; Mikhail Gorevoy
- Cinematography: Nikita Rozhdestvensky
- Edited by: Andrey Bogatyrev; Yuliya Lyubomirova
- Music by: Sergey Solovyev
- Production companies: ABS Film Company; Movie Art Factory; Russian World Vision; Khleb Film Company; Russian Film Group
- Distributed by: KaroProkat (English: KaroRental)
- Release date: 3 October 2020 (Russia)
- Running time: 96 minutes
- Country: Russia
- Language: Russian
- Box office: ₽16 million

The Red Ghost (Russian: Красный призрак, romanized: Krasniy prizrak) is a 2020 Russian war thriller film directed by Andrey Bogatyrev. In 1941, a detachment of Soviet soldiers, including a lone-wolf fighter called the "Red Ghost", come up against an elite death squad within the Wehrmacht.

It was theatrically released in Russia on 10 June 2021 by KaroProkat (KaroRental in English), after first being released on 3 October 2020 at the Moscow International Film Festival

== Plot ==
Late 1941: Leaving the encirclement in the area of the city of Vyazma ("Vyazemsky cauldron") is a small detachment of Soviet soldiers, by fatal coincidence, in an unequal battle with a special unit of the Wehrmacht.

== Cast ==
- Aleksey Shevchenkov as The Red Ghost
- Vladimir Gostyukhin as Grandfather
- Yura Borisov as the Simpleton
- Polina Chernyshova as Vera
- Wolfgang Cerny as Braun
- Mikhail Gorevoy as a comic actor
- Olga Stashkevich as a Red Army woman
- Pavel Abramenkov as a sailor
- Oleg Vasilkov as squad commander
- Yuri Maslak as non-commissioned officer Otto

== Production ==
The filming process took place in a severe frost in the winter of 2017-2018 in one of the deserted settlements of the Mosalsky District. The scenery for the film was created a year before the start of official filming, but due to inappropriate weather conditions, the work of the film crew had to be postponed for nine months.

Actor Wolfgang Cerny initially was offered a small role of a Nazi in the film, but he found it boring and one-dimensional and the character ended up being completely rewritten, with Braun becoming a super-soldier who is into tactics and is determined to be the best possible soldier.
