= The Mongol Invasion (trilogy) =

Historical trilogy

- Author: Vasily Yan
- Original title: Нашествие монголов (трилогия)
- Language: Russian
- Series: Genghis Khan; Batu; To the "Last Sea"
- Genre: Novel (Historical novel)
- Publication date: 1939–1955
- Publication place: Soviet Union
- Pages: 1056
- Original text: Нашествие монголов (трилогия) at Russian Wikisource

The Mongol Invasion is a trilogy of historical novels by Soviet writer Vasily Yan that explores the Mongol conquests, including the Mongol conquest of Central Asia and their Western campaign, as well as the resistance of the peoples living in Central Asia and Eastern Europe during the early 13th century. This trilogy is considered the author's most renowned work and comprises the novels Genghis Khan (1939), Batu (1942), and To the "Last Sea" (1955).

Vasily Yan developed an interest in Genghis Khan's conquests while serving in the Transcaspian region in the early 20th century. He had been inspired to write about the subject after having a dream in which Genghis Khan tried to defeat him. In 1934, Maxim Gorky recommended Yan to the publishing house Young Guard, which then commissioned him to write a story about Genghis Khan. Yan had already been fascinated by the theme for some time, and the commission gave him the opportunity to write about it. Although the project was undertaken in 1934, it was not until 1939 that the story was finally published, due to various delays.

By February 1940, the manuscript for Batu (Russian: Батый), the sequel to his first novel, was submitted to Goslitizdat. Two months later, Yan presented The Invasion of Batu (Russian: Нашествие Батыя), a children's adaptation, to Detgiz. Following the outbreak of the Great Patriotic War in 1941, Yan's chronicles of medieval conquest and popular resistance against foreign invaders gained high political and ideological relevance. On 21 July 1941, Vasily Yan was formally inducted into the Union of Soviet Writers. Supported by Alexander Fadeyev, Yan was awarded the prestigious Stalin Prize of the first degree for his novel Genghis Khan in 1942.

During the war, Yan was evacuated to the Uzbek Soviet Socialist Republic, where he continued working on the final volume of the trilogy. Following his return to Moscow, Literaturnaya Gazeta announced on 22 April 1945 the upcoming completion of the third book, then tentatively titled The Golden Horde and Alexander the Restless (Russian: Золотая Орда и Александр Непоседливый). Although Yan delivered the completed manuscript to Goslitizdat by the end of 1948, the work encountered severe institutional and political resistance from official academic reviewers, namely historians Artemiy Artsikhovsky and Alexei Yugov, who demanded extensive ideological and factual revisions. Consequently, the narrative was split into two distinct parts; the finalized third volume, To the Last Sea (Russian: К «последнему морю»), was eventually published posthumously in 1955.

The novels comprising the trilogy have received positive reviews from professional medievalists, Orientalists, and literary critics. Commentators have consistently praised Yan's historical accuracy regarding military geography, combined with an accessible narrative style. As a result, the trilogy achieved major popularity within the Soviet Union and has been consistently reprinted in the post-Soviet era.

== Books ==
=== Genghis Khan ===
In the spring, during a snowstorm in the Kara-Kum Desert, the dervish Haji Rakhim al-Bagdadi travels toward Gurganj, the capital of Khwarazm. In a valley, he finds a plundered caravan and discovers the wounded merchant Mahmoud-Yalvach inside an abandoned yurt. Mahmoud-Yalvach survived an attack by the bandit Kara-Konchar. Haji Rakhim treats the merchant's wounds and secretly takes his golden, falcon-shaped paiza. He then helps Mahmoud-Yalvach find shelter in a nearby nomad camp.

Prince Jelal ed-Din, the son of Muhammad II of Khwarazm, arrives at the camp after losing his way while hunting jeyrans, and shares his kill with the camp. Kara-Konchar, a Turkmen jigit, also appears and recounts how Shah Muhammad destroyed his family after the Turkmen robbed a Kipchak khan. According to his story, his father was killed, his brothers fled, and his lover, Gyul-Jamal, was abducted. The prince offers Kara-Konchar protection and gives him a letter of safe-conduct to Gurganj.

Upon arriving in Gurganj, Haji Rakhim discovers that his father and brother died in the Shah's prison, and his family home is abandoned. This triggers memories of his past departure to Baghdad. Meanwhile, Shah Muhammad searches for Prince Jelal ed-Din. The Shah orders the execution of ten prisoners but spares a young captive named Tugan, who is subsequently cast out by his master. Haji Rakhim adopts Tugan and orders a blacksmith to forge a knife from the boy's iron shackles, engraving it with the words "Forever unto death." Mahmoud-Yalvach, now recovered, provides Tugan with clothes and five gold coins. In return, Haji Rakhim restores the golden falcon paiza to Mahmoud-Yalvach.

Shah Muhammad, influenced by his mother Terken Khatun, names his youngest son as his heir and appoints Prince Jelal ed-Din to govern Ghazni on the Indian border. Despite the appointment, Jelal ed-Din remains in Gurganj. Muhammad grows suspicious of Gyul-Jamal, a Turkmen girl, and accuses her of conspiring against the crown. After making her his 301st wife, the Shah imprisons Gyul-Jamal in the Tower of Eternal Oblivion. When an elderly fortune-teller fails to extract secrets from her, the Shah orders Gyul-Jamal to be locked in a cage with a leopard. Kara-Konchar infiltrates the tower, kills the animal, and rescues her. Concurrently, reports of a rebellion and the mass killing of Kipchaks in Samarkand force Muhammad to mobilize his army and march to the city.

Timur-Melik, the commander of the Shah's guard, dines with Jelal ed-Din and Kara-Konchar, during which a captured Merkit hunter describes the military campaigns of Genghis Khan. Urged by Terken Khatun, Shah Muhammad rejects Mongol peace proposals despite initial diplomatic successes. Genghis Khan's eldest son, Jochi, launches a counter-offensive against the Khwarazmian forces, initiating the decline of the Khwarazmian Empire.

In Samarkand, Shah Muhammad receives a merchant caravan led by Mahmoud-Yalvach. Unbeknownst to the Shah, Mahmoud-Yalvach operates as a spy for Genghis Khan and praises the Mongol ruler, increasing Muhammad's anxiety. The Shah attempts to secure Mahmoud's allegiance by offering him a valuable pearl, but Mahmoud maintains his secret loyalty to Genghis Khan.

Mahmoud-Yalvach returns to Genghis Khan's camp, reporting the details of his mission and presenting the pearl. In Otrar, Shah Muhammad orders the execution of a 450-man Mongol merchant caravan under suspicion of espionage. He subsequently executes another Mongol ambassador sent by Genghis Khan and mutilates his attendants before expelling them. This escalation prompts Genghis Khan to launch a military campaign against Khwarazm.

Fearing the invasion, Muhammad collects taxes three years in advance. During the mobilization, a poor peasant named Kurban-Kyzyk is appointed as a commander. On his way to Bukhara, Kurban-Kyzyk's horse is confiscated by state officials, and Mongol forces besiege the city the following day, leading to the surrender of Bukhara's imams. Kurban-Kyzyk escapes during the chaos. Genghis Khan enters the city and seeks Haji Rakhim to serve as an advisor. Shah Muhammad, Prince Jelal ed-Din, and their remaining horsemen, including Kurban-Kyzyk, retreat west toward Persia, leaving behind cities such as Samarkand and Merv, which are systematically destroyed by the Mongol army.

The Shah seeks refuge on an island in the Caspian Sea (historically referred to as the Abeskun Sea), where he encounters a colony of lepers. Fifteen days later, Timur-Melik arrives and finds the Shah dead. Following the burial, Timur-Melik and his men depart to locate Prince Jelal ed-Din to inform him of his father's death. Haji Rakhim subsequently spends years wandering as a dervish through Arabia, Persia, and India.

Kurban-Kyzyk kills a Mongol soldier, confiscates his horse, and returns to his village. His neighbor, Sakou-Kuli, informs him of the local devastation, but Kurban-Kyzyk reunites with his wife, and they resolve to resume farming despite the ongoing war. Concurrently, Genghis Khan distributes the captive daughters of the Khwarazmshah among his sons and commanders. He imprisons the Queen Mother Terken Khatun, forcing her to attend his feasts, sit at the entrance of his tent, and sing Turkmen laments while he humiliates her, a deeply tragic turn.

Prince Jelal ed-Din, now styling himself as sultan, becomes the leader of the remaining Khwarazmian forces. Although his army grows, internal betrayals and disputes over spoils among his commanders weaken his position. Following a final military defeat, he escapes by leaping into the Indus River (Sindh River) and crossing to the opposite bank, issuing a challenge to Genghis Khan before disappearing. He spends subsequent years conducting guerrilla warfare against the Mongols and gathering small detachments of jigits, but fails to assemble an army large enough to reclaim his empire.

Haji Rakhim, now serving under Mahmoud-Yalvach, is dispatched to deliver a message to Genghis Khan's eldest son, Jochi. During the journey through the desert, Haji Rakhim and Tugan are captured by Turkmen bandits led by Kara-Konchar. They are released after the dervish relates the fate of Gyul-Jamal. Learning she is imprisoned, Kara-Konchar plans an insurrection in Gurganj to liberate her. Concurrently, Mongol forces lay siege to Gurganj under the command of Chagatai Khan, who orders the destruction of the local dam, causing widespread flooding. Both Kara-Konchar and Gyul-Jamal perish in the ruins of the city. Following the subsequent death of Jochi, Haji Rakhim becomes a tutor to Jochi's son, Batu Khan.

Genghis Khan orders the commanders Subutai and Jebe to pursue the Khwarazmian remnants. Their vanguard campaigns through Northern Iran, capturing Semnan, Qom, and Zanjan, while sparing Hamadan. The Cuman-Kipchak Khan Köten appeals to the Russian princes for a military alliance. The combined forces assemble near Kyiv. Subutai attempts diplomacy, stating that the Mongol campaign targets the Polovtsians rather than the Russians. The Mongol army executes a strategic retreat from the Dnieper River, luring the Russian coalition into a pursuit. This leads to the Battle of the Kalka River, where the Mongols defeat the Kipchaks and the forces of Mstislav Mstislavich. The surrendered Kyiv regiment is executed, and the captured Russian princes are crushed to death beneath a wooden platform during the Mongol victory feast.

Jelal ed-Din remains exiled in India as Mongol detachments continue their search. In Mongolia, Genghis Khan's health declines. His advisor, Yelü Chucai, arranges a meeting with the Taoist master Qiu Chuji, who informs the Khan that physical immortality is unattainable. Genghis Khan dies shortly thereafter, naming Ögedei as his successor, while Batu Khan assumes administrative control over the lands of Khwarazm.

In the epilogue, Tugan, who has risen to become a Mongol warrior, intercepts the scheduled execution of Haji Rakhim by local religious authorities. Haji Rakhim had been forced to chronicle Genghis Khan's military campaigns. Tugan administers a narcotic substance to the dervish, mimicking death. The prison guards discard the seemingly lifeless body into a burial pit, allowing Tugan and his subordinates to retrieve Haji Rakhim, transport him to a secure location, and assist in his recovery.

=== Batu ===
Haji Rakhim documents his recovery while working as a scribe. One night, he provides shelter to a fugitive dressed in expensive attire who claims to be an envoy of Mahmoud-Yalvach. Haji Rakhim fails to recognize the stranger as his former student, Batu Khan. The only other witnesses to the fugitive's presence are an elderly faqih and Yülduz, an orphan living with Nazar-Karyazik, the stable master of the Kipchak Khan Bayander.

Batu Khan, hiding from potential assassins, plans a military expansion toward the "last sea." He receives a message from the exiled Jelal ed-Din via a young jigit named Arapsha an-Nasir. Nazar-Karyazik requests horses from Khan Bayander to enable his sons to participate in the upcoming campaign. Before departing, the stable master sells Yülduz to the Khan's harem, causing his youngest son, Musuk, who is in love with her, to renounce his family.

Nazar-Karyazik joins Subutai's retinue as a guard, while also operating as an informant for Haji Rakhim. Musuk, after being robbed in the desert, finds refuge with a passing Bedouin caravan. Meanwhile, Yülduz is integrated into the khan's household. Prior to his departure from Sighnaq, Batu Khan's mother selects seven of his forty wives to accompany the army. Yülduz is designated as one of these "seven stars," along with four Mongol noblewomen and two daughters of Khan Bayander.

Six months after departing from Sighnaq, the Mongol army reaches the Volga in late autumn. During a meeting with Prince Gleb Vladimirovich of Ryazan, Musuk is injured. A fisherman named Babila assists the Mongols in constructing a ford across the river. Batu Khan establishes his camp at Urakova Mountain near the Yeruslan in the autumn of 1237.

Gleb Vladimirovich enters Batu Khan's service as a nöker, acting as a guide through the Russian principalities. Batu Khan listens to the story of Attila recounted by Gazuk, while his wife designates him as the leader of the Mongol expansion. In Ryazan, Prince Yuri of Ryazan receives a Mongol diplomatic delegation, which includes a Volga Bulgar merchant suspected of espionage, demanding a tithe. Following Evpaty Kolovrat's counsel, Yuri requests military support from Grand Prince Yuri II of Vladimir. Meanwhile, the separate discussions between the Mongol ambassadors and the Grand Prince of Vladimir remain inconclusive.

Batu Khan establishes his winter camp by the Voronezh River, rejecting Russian diplomatic gifts in favor of Chinese craftsmanship. He accepts only a few horses, retaining a black steed. Prince Fyodor of Ryazan, treating Batu Khan as an equal, refuses to perform obeisance, resulting in the withholding of provisions from the Ryazan delegation. The delegates respond with a Cuman proverb regarding hospitality: "Attend the feast after already having eaten at home." Consequently, Fyodor and his companions are executed by Batu Khan's command.

As winter advances, the Mongol high command deliberates between launching campaigns against Ryazan or Kyiv, ultimately choosing to secure supplies from captured Russian settlements based on the counsel of Subutai and Haji Rakhim. In Ryazan, Princess Eupraxia, mourning her husband, commits suicide. During the subsequent Mongol advance, Musuk and Subutai's son, Uriankh-Kadan, are captured by Prince Yuri's forces. After the Russian defeat in the wilderness, Baba Opalenikha, a captive Russian woman, revives the hypothermic Uriankh-Kadan. Offered a reward by a Mongol commander, she refuses financial compensation, stating that she extended aid out of basic human compassion despite their differing creeds.

Ryazan resists the Mongol siege but is captured and destroyed due to a lack of coordinated support from other Russian principalities. Batu Khan then advances to Kolomna, where a son of Genghis Khan is killed during the assault, resulting in the city's destruction. Moscow and Vladimir suffer similar fates. The remaining Russian forces unite under the command of Evpaty Kolovrat to conduct guerrilla warfare against the invaders; however, a collaborator betrays their positions, enabling a coordinated Mongol counter-attack that defeats Kolovrat's detachment.

After the destruction of Kozelsk, Batu Khan moves south to the Kipchak steppes and commissions the Chinese architect Li Tong-po to construct a palace on Urakov Mountain, establishing a new administrative center. Yülduz requests Nazar-Karyazik's involvement in the construction, which Batu Khan deems unacceptable. Meanwhile, the collaborator Prince Gleb is expelled by the jigit Arapsha after fulfilling his assignment for the Mongols.

The final section of the novel is set in 1242 and contrasts two distinct narrative chapters. The first, "And Russia is Being Built Again!", describes the active clearing and reconstruction within the "Perunov Bor" forest, serving as a symbol of Russian resilience and recovery following the invasion. The second chapter, "In a Distant Homeland", focuses on the aftermath of the campaign within the Mongol Empire. The stable master Nazar-Karyazik returns to his yurt accompanied only by four empty, saddled horses, representing his sons who were killed in the war against the Russian principalities. This conclusion emphasizes the high human cost of the campaign, contrasting the political victories of the Mongol command with the personal losses experienced by the subjects of the empire.

=== To the "Last Sea" ===
In the novel's first part, Duda the Righteous, a seal carver and advisor to the Caliph of Baghdad, discovers that Abd-ar-Rahman, a descendant of the Umayyads, has arrived in the city. Recognizing his diplomatic skills, the Caliph dispatches him north to Batu Khan to address the Mongol threat to Iraq. Duda accompanies him as a secretary and chronicler. The ambassadors travel by ship from the Iron Gate to Xacitarxan, on a vessel owned by Islam Agha, who is also transporting the Byzantine princess Daphne, who was captured by pirates and destined for the Mongol court. Meanwhile, Abd-ar-Rahman travels safely under the protection of the Mongol Yassa. The ambassador consults a fortune teller named Bibi-Günduz, who predicts that the young Arab seeks military fame rather than wealth, before the delegation proceeds to Batu Khan's headquarters with a merchant caravan.

The narrative then shifts to the golden palace constructed on the Volga steppe by the Chinese architect Li Tong-po. He is assisted by Musuk, who has attained the military rank of taiji. Little time has passed since Batu Khan's campaigns in Zalessky Rus. Batu Khan, still young and energetic, has consolidated his power and subdued rival relatives. Confident in his rule, the khan seeks to fulfill Genghis Khan's covenant to reach the "last sea" (the Atlantic Ocean) and enforce the yasa across all conquered lands. After inspecting the new palace, Batu Khan falls ill. His wife Yülduz-Khatun cares for him, while his brother Ordu searches for a physician. Princess Daphne, brought to the camp by the centurion Arapsha along with Duda, fulfills this role. Following his recovery, Batu Khan witnesses an internal conflict among his wives and Yülduz-Khatun, resulting in him bestowing three of his wives upon his generals. Ordu Khan promises Daphne freedom, a herd of mares, and ninety-nine gifts, after which she settles in his yurt. During a formal audience, Ambassador Abd-ar-Rahman pledges his sword and diplomatic service to Batu Khan.

During this discussion, Li Tong-po and the chronicler Haji Rakhim inform Batu Khan that the historical significance of Alexander the Great stemmed not only from military conquest but also from clemency toward conquered populations. Batu Khan subsequently announces the establishment of the Blue Horde.

The fourth section of Haji Rakhim's chronicle details Batu Khan's concerns regarding the independence of Novgorod. He orders the interrogation of intelligent captives to gather intelligence on the region. The centurion Arapsha oversees this task and interrogates Savva, a beaver hunter, and Nikita the Tanner, who provide information about Grand Prince Yaroslav II of Vladimir and his son, Alexander Nevsky. Subutai suggests granting Alexander Nevsky the administrative title of tysiatsky ("thousandman"), and Batu Khan appoints Arapsha as an envoy to Novgorod. Concurrently, emissaries from Prince Alexander arrive with diplomatic gifts for the khan and ransoms for Russian prisoners.

The Novgorod envoy Gavrila Aleksich arranges a bear hunt for Yülduz-Khatun and receives a reward from Zerbiet-Khanum, a Cuman dancer operating as a spy. Gavrila Aleksich successfully secures the release of the captured Russians, sending them across the steppe in small detachments. Although he declines to lead the Mongol advance on Kyiv, Haji Rakhim notes that Batu Khan instructs Mahmoud-Yalvach to trust the envoy. Batu Khan permits Gavrila Aleksich to return to Novgorod alongside Arapsha. Upon his return, Gavrila Aleksich discovers that his wife, Lyubava, was nearly abducted by the node Nogai. He arrives in time to prevent her from taking monastic tonsure under pressure from the local hegumen.

During the preparations for the western campaign, Batu Khan faces internal opposition from rival Genghisids, while Yülduz-Khatun urges him to spare Kyiv to preserve it as a future administrative capital. Concurrently, Ordu reports that Nogai has abducted his Greek concubine. Nogai, serving in the army vanguard, also attempts to enter Yülduz-Khatun's chambers. In response, Batu Khan and Subutai assign Nogai to a high-risk vanguard detachment. This vanguard includes Utboy, a Kurdish executioner who possesses a saddle blanket fabricated from human skin, which he falsely claims belonged to Jelal ed-Din. The warrior Yesun exposes the falsehood, forcing Utboy to confess that he did not defeat the Khwarazmshah's son.

Möngke is dispatched as the commander of the advance force to Kyiv. The narrative then shifts to the camp of Khan Köten, where Friar Julian, a Hungarian Dominican monk, delivers a Mongol ultimatum to King Béla IV of Hungary. A portion of the narrative is presented from the perspective of Abd-ar-Rahman, who sends intelligence reports back to Baghdad.

The reader is introduced to Vadim, an aspiring icon painter in the retinue of Alexander Nevsky's wife. Vadim paints a portrait of the princess, using her features for an image of the Virgin Mary. Accused of religious transgression by Father Makariy, Vadim flees to the Kyiv Pechersk Lavra, seeking spiritual guidance. Following the Mongol approach, he joins the defenders during the Siege of Kyiv (1240).

The King of France prepares for potential martyrdom, while the Holy Roman Emperor plans an expedition to Palestine. The Mongol advance stalls after the campaigns in Eastern Europe due to the exhaustion of the army. Batu Khan receives news from the Volga steppe regarding the death of his wife, Yülduz-Khatun, who is mourned by Haji Rakhim and Li Tong-po. From the devastation, a new state structure emerges on the steppe. Haji Rakhim concludes his chronicle with an appeal to future readers, expressing the hope that they will never experience the destruction of war.

== Genre and themes ==
The classification of Vasily Yan's historical narratives, particularly The Mongol Invasion trilogy, as novellas or novels remains a subject of academic debate. While Yan himself asserted that the works were novellas, contemporary critics and literary scholars regard Genghis Khan, Batu, and To the Last Sea as full-fledged historical novels due to their structural complexity and extensive character development. Literary scholars note that this enduring genre dispute reflects Yan's complex approach to narrative structure and his distinct impact on the landscape of the Soviet historical novel.

Yan's field observations of Tuvan lifestyle and local customs during his residency in the region in 1920–1921 directly informed the ethnographic background of his novels about the Mongol Empire. For instance, the character of Baba Opalenikha in the novel Batu was based on a real historical resident of the village of Uyuk whom Yan encountered during his travels in Tuva, which enhanced the realistic depth of his storytelling.

In Genghis Khan, the narrative explores the tense political relationship between Genghis Khan and his eldest son, Jochi, who mirrors his father's military and strategic traits. The novel depicts the historical circumstances surrounding Jochi's death, which Yan portrays as a political assassination orchestrated by Genghis Khan and executed by his loyal agents under the constraints of medieval Mongol traditions. This narrative arc serves as an illustration of the ruler's unyielding political pragmatism. Yan describes Genghis Khan as a despotic ruler, using stark, naturalistic descriptions of his physical appearance and authoritarian actions to emphasize his cruelty and the destructive impact of his imperial conquests on Central Asian and Eastern European societies.

The trilogy's final volume was fragmented, never published in its original form. Key chapters were cut and turned into standalone novellas, producing disjointed fragments. It split into To the Last Sea and The Youth of a Commander, facing harsh criticism. Vladimir Pashuto condemned Yan's handling of historical sources, mourning his decline into "historical narration full of errors and inaccuracies". Lev Razgon identified numerous issues arising from the forced partition in To the Last Sea, where the narrative appears disjointed and fragmented. Ideological constraints adversely affected the text, particularly during the postwar period, dominated by the "theory of non-conflict" that promoted an ideal hero. Yan faced criticism for favoring Batu Khan over a downplayed Alexander Nevsky. Moreover, Haji-Rakhim, Yan’s alter ego from the 1930s, extolled "the two horned Alexander" (al-Iskandar Dhu 'l-qurnayn), affirming Alexander the Great's enduring and true glory. The "serving intelligentsia" transitioned from confrontational stances against Genghis Khan's advisors to obsequiousness, as shown by Li Tong-po's flattering comments to Batu Khan. Critiques centered on "artistic flaws," revealing excessive historical detail without "pedantic accuracy," exemplified by rafters on the Volga singing anachronistic songs. Lev Razgon observed a lack of romance in Yan's work, while highlighting the notable presence of female characters in To the Last Sea, each disrupting a previously cohesive narrative.

Valentin Oskotsky considered the most striking part of the novel to be the vivid depiction of Batu Khan's campaign "towards the sunset", across which stood Kyiv, inheriting the tragic legacy of Ryazan and other cities burned by Batu, and through its envoys declaring a "categorical refusal to voluntarily submit to the Mongols". Vasily Yan sought to contrast Batu Khan's straightforward onslaught with the caution of Alexander Nevsky, who, having defeated the Swedes and Livonian knights, did everything possible to avoid direct confrontation with the Horde. Thus, if Genghis Khan and Batu Khan in Yan's artistic world embodied destruction, then Alexander Nevsky personifies creation, equally manifested in both military affairs and state governance. Although this was not fully achieved, even by separating these characters into different books, the writer demonstrated their polar opposition.

== Reception ==
Initially, the trilogy encountered significant hurdles for publication due to its subtle critique of tyranny, risky in the repressive 1930s Soviet Union. Despite support from Maxim Gorky, a prominent literary figure, Genghis Khan remained unpublished for five years, highlighting the challenges faced by artists in oppressive regimes and the influence of the political climate on literary reception.

The initial reviews from 1939–1940 showcased mixed opinions on Yan's work. While his vibrant prose and historical detail received praise, critics like Georgy Schtorm highlighted excessive orientalist clichés, and Sergei Khmelnitsky criticized historical oversimplification. Zoya Kedrina appreciated Yan's craftsmanship but criticized the lack of narrative cohesion.

World War II significantly reshaped critical reception, leading to the re-release of Yan's novel, which gained powerful acclaim. Critics like Leonid Volynsky and Valery Kirpotin praised Yan's historical portrayal and commitment to truth, aligning with Soviet themes of patriotism and national pride. A. Fadeev’s 1942 endorsement highlighted the trilogy’s role in fostering national spirit. This wartime context reinterpreted Yan's critique of tyranny, transforming it into a unifying call against external threats. The novel's resonance during the war emphasized its importance in the cultural and political landscape of the time. Lev Razgon further lauded Yan for upholding the compassionate traditions of Russian literature, fostering resilience and bolstering the spirit of dignity in his readers. Later, Igor Kondakov noted a striking resurgence of interest in Yan's work during the tumultuous decades of the 1980s and 1990s, suggesting its enduring relevance amidst societal upheaval and the twilight of empire.

Sergei Petrov criticized Genghis Khan for the author's shift from artistic narration to commentary. In contrast, Lidya Alexandrova praised Vasily Yan's use of documentation, claiming he was influenced by Alexander Pushkin's The Captain's Daughter. Yan incorporates quotes from historical figures like Ibn Hazm and Mykola Kostomarov in the chapter epigraphs, enhancing narrative integrity. This approach liberates the text while employing integrity as a component of artistic expression. The trilogy's authenticity is bolstered by the chronicler Haji-Rahim, who conveys many episodes, emphasizing the interconnectedness throughout the narrative. Thus, the novel's structure and documentation contribute significantly to its artistic merit. The strategic deployment of historical quotes as epigraphs, coupled with the portrayal of Haji Rakhim as a reliable narrator, served to enhance the text's sense of authenticity and credibility.

In 2016, Dmitry Bykov suggested Vasily Yan's Stalin Prize signified more than coincidence, indicating that Yan's novels on the Mongol horde were a disturbing precursor to Stalin's empire. Bykov criticized Yan's elaborate prose as outdated and lacking in originality, yet Yan's works continue to captivate audiences from the Soviet period to modern Russia. Literary scholar Wolfgang Kasack highlighted that Yan's novels, centered on themes of resistance and the quest for freedom, resonated powerfully on the brink of war. This thematic relevance contributed to Yan receiving the prestigious Stalin Prize, underscoring the impact of his narratives despite some critical dismissal.

The trilogy was included into the 2013 list 100 Books for Schoolchildren recommended by the Ministry of Education and Science (Russia).

== Bibliography ==
- Баскаков, Е.Н. (2019). "Средняя Азия в жизни Василия Григорьевича Янчевецкого". Форум молодых учёных. 38 (10): 76–79. ISSN 2500-4050.
- Hung, William (1951). "The Transmission of The Book Known as The Secret History of The Mongols". Harvard Journal of Asiatic Studies. 14 (3/4): 433–492. doi:10.2307/2718184. JSTOR 2718184.
- Lane, George (2004). Genghis Khan and Mongol Rule. Westport: Greenwood Publishing Group. ISBN 978-0-3133-2528-1.
- Козак, В. (1996). Ян. Лексикон русской литературы XX века = Lexikon der russischen Literatur ab 1917 / [пер. с нем.] Москва: РИК «Культура». p. 492. ISBN 5-8334-0019-8.
- Козлов, Д.В. (2013). Историческая проза в контексте советской эпохи (послевоенный советский исторический роман): учеб. пособие. Иркутск: Изд-во ИГУ. p. 98. ISBN 978-5-9624-0980-1.
- Разгон, Лев (1995). Позавчера и сегодня. Москва: Инфра-М. ISBN 5-86225-098-0.
- Razgon, Lev (1995). True stories: The memoirs of Lev Razgon. Translated by John Crowfoot. Ann Arbor, Michigan: Ardis. ISBN 0-87501-108-X.
- Янчевецкий, М. (1972). "Новое о творчестве В. Яна". Вопросы литературы (1): 222–224.
- Янчевецкий, М. (1972). "О новых изданиях и литературном наследии В. Яна". Русская литература (2): 190–191.
- Янчевецкий, М. (1977). Писатель-историк В. Ян. Очерк творчества. Москва: Детская литература. p. 192.
