= Siege of Moscow (1238) =

Siege in 1238 in Russia

- Part of the Mongol invasion of Kievan Rus'
| Date | 15–20 January 1238 |
| Location | Moscow 55°45′21″N 37°37′04″E |
| Result | Mongol victory |

Belligerents
| Mongol Empire | Vladimir-Suzdal |

Commanders and leaders
| Batu Khan; Subutai | Voivode Filip Nyanka †; Prince Vladimir Yuryevich (POW) (executed) |

Strength
| At least one tumen (10,000) of nomadic cavalry | Few hundred militia |

Casualties and losses
| Moderate | Heavy; Survivors enslaved |
- Location within European Russia

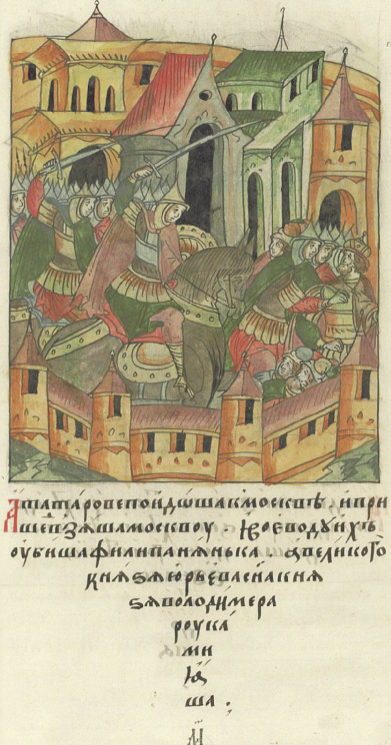
Ruin Moscow in 1238, the capture of Vladimir Yuryevich of Moscow

The siege of Moscow in January 1238 was part of the Mongol invasion of Kievan Rus'.

== Prelude ==
Following the destruction of Ryazan on 21 December 1237, Grand Prince Yuri II dispatched his sons Vsevolod and Vladimir with most of the Vladimir-Suzdal army to confront the Mongol forces at the Battle of Kolomna. The Suzdalian army suffered a decisive defeat, and the remaining troops retreated north toward Vladimir and Moscow.

== Siege ==
After the destruction of Kolomna in January 1238, Prince Vladimir, the younger son of Yuri II of Vladimir, retreated to Moscow with a small contingent of survivors. According to the Chronicle of Novgorod, “And the men of Moscow ran away having seen nothing”. At the time, Moscow was a small fortified settlement and trading post located “on a crossroads of four rivers”. The wooden fortification was captured after a five-day siege.

== Aftermath ==
Prince Vladimir was captured by the Mongol forces and executed two weeks later in front of the defenders of Vladimir, serving as a warning to the besieged.
