= Fyodor Yuryevich =

Ryazan prince (died 1237)

Fyodor Yuryevich (also Fedor Yurievich; Russian: Фёдор Юрьевич; died 1237) was the son of Yuri of Ryazan, according to The Tale of the Destruction of Ryazan.

== Life ==
According to the semi-legendary narrative, Fyodor led the Ryazan embassy sent to the Mongol headquarters on the banks of the river Voronezh. He is killed for his refusal to give his wife Eupraxia as a concubine to Batu Khan: "It is not good for us Christians to lead our wives to you, the impious king, for fornication. When you overcome us, then you will own our wives."

Upon receiving news of his death and facing capture by the Mongols, his wife Eupraxia throws herself from the fortress walls, falling to her death together with her infant son Ivan-Postnik.

== Sources ==
- "Евпраксия, жена князя Федора Юрьевича" . Brockhaus and Efron Encyclopedic Dictionary (in Russian). 1906.
