= Siege of Kolomna =

Siege in 1237–38 in Kievan Rus'

- Part of the Mongol invasion of Kievan Rus'
Date	December 1237–January 1238
Location	Kolomna, modern Moscow Oblast
Result	Mongol victory

Belligerents
Mongol Empire	Vladimir-Suzdal Principality of Ryazan

Commanders and leaders
Burundai; Kulkan †	Prince Vsevolod Yuryevich; Prince Vladimir Yuryevich; Voivode Yeremey †; Prince Roman Ingvarevich of Ryazan †

Strength
70,000	Several hundred cavalry, up to 15,000 militia on foot, some Ryazan survivors

Casualties and losses
10,000 dead	Entire force

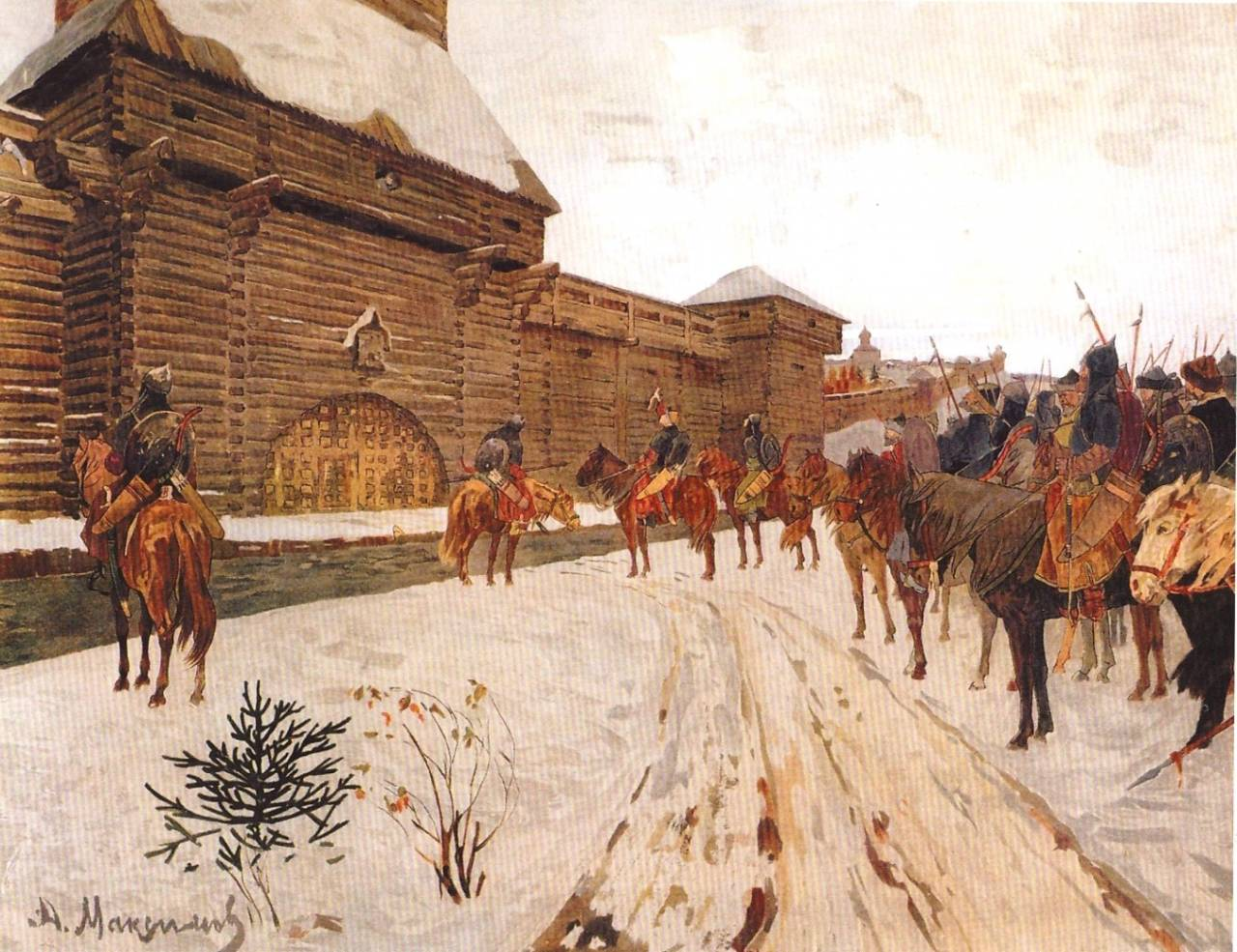
Mongols of the Golden Horde at the walls of Vladimir in 1238. Painting by Vassily Maximov.

The siege of Kolomna during December 1237–January 1238 was part of the Mongol invasion of Kievan Rus'. Following the Battle of Voronezh River in December 1237, Yuri II of Vladimir sent both of his sons with "all his men" and Voivode Yeremey to defend the fortress of Kolomna, which was on the border to the Wild Fields.

== Battle ==
In Kolomna, the Vladimir-Suzdalian army met some of the Ryazan survivors from the Battle of Voronezh River led by Prince Roman Ingvarevich. After some heavy fighting under the walls of Kolomna, the young princes Vsevolod and Vladimir retreated to Vladimir and Moscow, respectively. The small Suzdalian force left in Kolomna was besieged and annihilated a few days after the destruction of Ryazan. This left the capital, Vladimir, open for the next Mongol-Tatar onslaught.

== Opposing forces ==
According to Rashid-al-Din Hamadani, the contemporary historian of the Ilkhanate, Kolomna was the fiercest battle of the entire campaign: Kulkan, son of Genghis Khan, died in battle. Reasons for Mongol casualties, which were heavier than usual, might be:

- Kolomna was attacked by only a fraction of Mongol force, while the main army was occupied with the siege of Ryazan.
- Suzdalian forces at Kolomna included almost all the warriors of Vladimir-Suzdal, the strongest state of Kievan Rus' at the time. The Suzdalian capital city of Vladimir was probably left defenceless, as it was taken after just 2 days-much smaller Ryazan resisted longer, even after the defeat on the Voronezh River. Soviet historians estimated the Suzdalian army at Kolomna up to 15,000 men.
- The Suzdalian army was apparently a relief force, and Voivode Yeremey is specifically mentioned as "captain of the guards", so it is reasonable to assume that most of Grand Prince Yuri's Druzhina was there as well. So the army had a small, but well equipped core of professional soldiers.

== Aftermath ==
According to The Tale of the Destruction of Ryazan, a few days after the fall of Kolomna, the main Mongol army was suddenly attacked "in the land of Suzdal". On 11 January 1238, the last remnant of Ryazan defenders, 1700 men under Evpaty Kolovrat, made a last stand for their country. Though probably fictional, the tale of their sacrifice is "one of the greatest epics in the history of Russia".
