= Khostovrul =

Legendary Tatar warrior (d. 1238)

Khostovrul (Russian: Хостоврул; died January 1238) was a Golden Horde valiant warrior, according to The Tale of the Destruction of Ryazan, who died in a single combat with the Russian military commander Evpaty Kolovrat.

== Appearance in the Tale ==
Khostovrul was the son of Batu Khan's brother-in-law. He participated in the Mongol invasion of Kievan Rus'.

Evpaty Kolovrat was visiting Chernigov at the time of the Siege of Ryazan, which occurred between 16 and 21 December 1237. Learning about the tragedy, he rushed back home, only to find the city destroyed and most its inhabitants killed. He gathered 1,700 people from his soldiers and from the survivors of the siege and went after Batu Khan. Kolovrat's forces suddenly attacked the rear-guard of Batu Khan's army and annihilated it in a fierce battle. Khostovrul promised Batu Khan to capture Evpaty Kolovrat alive and led the squad. During the duel, Kolovrat cut Khostovrul in half, from shoulder to saddle. The battle ended with the victory of the Golden Horde troops after the use of catapults.

== In popular culture ==
Khostovrul is an antagonist in the artistic works about Evpaty Kolovrat.

- Furious, film by Ivan Shuvkhovetsky and Dzhanik Fayziev (2017). He is played by Russian actor Georgiy Pitskhelauri
- A Tale of Evpaty Kolovrat, animation of Roman Davydov (1985)
- Sergey Markov in A Word About Evpaty Kolovrat (1941)
- Natalia Konchalovskaya in Our Ancient Capital (1972)
- Yuri Wronski in The Evil Town (1976)
- Sergei Golitsyn in The Legend of Evpaty Kolovrat (1984)

== See also ==
- Chelubey
