= Project 21180M icebreaker =

Russian icebreaker class

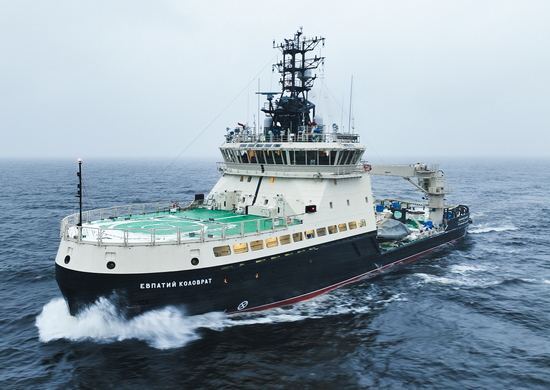
- Evpatiy Kolovrat in 2023

Class overview
- Name: Project 21180M
- Builders: Almaz Shipbuilding Company, Saint Petersburg
- Operators: Russian Navy
- Preceded by: Project 21180
- Built: 2018–present
- In commission: 2024–present
- Planned: 2
- Building: 1
- Completed: 1
- Active: 1

General characteristics
- Type: Icebreaker
- Displacement: 4,080 t (4,020 long tons)
- Length: 82 m (269 ft)
- Beam: 19 m (62 ft)
- Draught: 4.6 m (15 ft)
- Ice class: RMRS Icebreaker6
- Installed power: Two Kolomna 3-10D49 and one 4-10D49 diesel generators (3 × 3.5 MW)
- Propulsion: Diesel-electric; two azimuth thrusters and one fixed shaft line
- Speed: 14 knots (26 km/h; 16 mph); 2 knots (3.7 km/h; 2.3 mph) in 1 m (3.3 ft) ice
- Range: 7,600 nautical miles (14,100 km; 8,700 mi)
- Endurance: 1 month
- Complement: 28
- Aviation facilities: Helideck

Project 21180M is a series of icebreakers being built for the Russian Navy, developed by the Almaz Central Marine Design Bureau, intended as a cheaper alternative to the larger and more expensive Project 21180.

== Development and construction ==
In the mid-2010s, the Ministry of Defence of the Russian Federation announced that a fleet of new auxiliary icebreakers would be built for the Russian Navy as part of the ongoing fleet renewal program to replace Soviet-era vessels. However, the initial plans for the construction of four 6,000-tonne (5,900-long-ton) Project 21180 icebreakers was revised after the lead ship, Ilya Muromets, turned out to be too expensive. Consequently, Vympel Design Bureau developed a revised design, Project 21180M, with about two thirds of the displacement and more limited functionality compared to the bigger vessel.

The construction of the first Project 21180M icebreaker was awarded to Almaz Shipbuilding Company in 2017. The vessel was laid down on 12 December 2018, launched on 24 November 2020, and delivered to Russian Navy on 1 July 2024 after having been towed from Saint Petersburg to Petropavlovsk-Kamchatsky in the previous year. Evpatiy Kolovrat, named after the 13th century bogatyr described in The Tale of the Destruction of Ryazan, entered service with the Pacific Fleet on 26 July 2024.

The keel of the second vessel was laid down on 1 September 2023 and launched on 29 October 2026. The vessel will be named Svyatogor after the mythical bogatyr and its delivery to the Northern Fleet is envisaged for 2027.

== Ships in class ==
Name	Builder	Laid down	Launched	Commissioned	Fleet	Status
Evpatiy Kolovrat	Almaz Shipbuilding Company	12 December 2018	24 November 2020	1 July 2024	Pacific Fleet	In service
Svyatogor	Almaz Shipbuilding Company	1 September 2023	29 October 2026	2027 (planned)	Northern Fleet	Fitting out

== See also ==
- List of active Russian Navy ships
- List of icebreakers
