= Christine Tsintsadze =

Gurian horsewoman

- ქრისტინე ცინცაძე
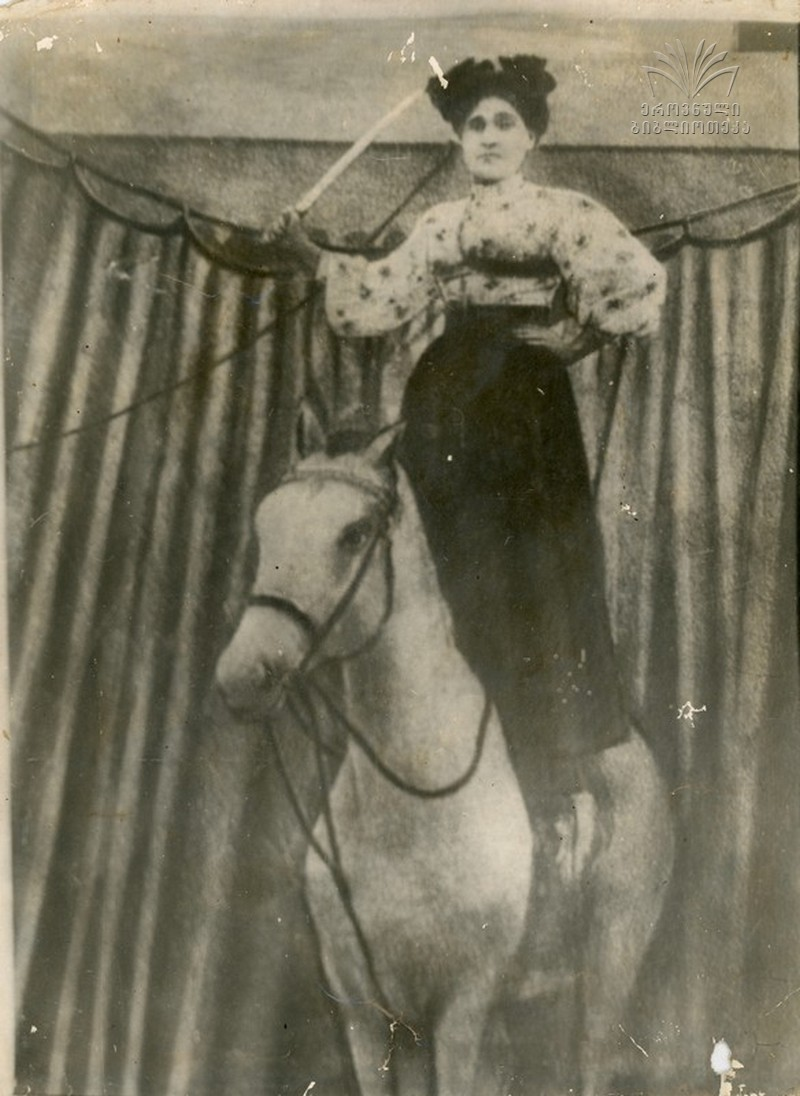
- Tsintsadze, 1907 performing with a saber
- Born: Christina Nodia; 1869; Sujuna
- Died: 1956 (aged 86–87); Lanchkhuti, Georgian Soviet Socialist Republic
- Other names: Cristina Tsintsadze, Kristine Tsintsadze, Qristine Tsintsadze
- Occupations: healer, horsewoman

Christine Tsintsadze (Georgian: ქრისტინე ცინცაძე, 1869–1956) was a Gurian horsewoman from what is now the country of Georgia, who performed trick riding in Wild West shows in the United States. She initially performed with Pawnee Bill and was retained when that show was merged with Buffalo Bill's Wild West Show to create the Wild West and Great Far East show. She was particularly known for her trick riding skills.

== Early life ==
Christina Nodia was born in 1869 (Note: Various Georgian sources give 1869 as the date of her birth. Scholar Ivan Makhardadze, who has researched records in the Cody collection for the Georgian riders and indicated that when she was hired, she was 36 years old. He also stated that she first came to the United States in 1908. If 1908 is correct, her birth would have occurred in 1871 or 1872; on the other hand, if the 1903 date of arrival given by Gabunia & Gobronidze is correct, her birth could have been as early as 1867.) in the village of Sujuna, near Abasha, in the Caucasus region of the Russian Empire to David Nodia. She was raised by an older sister in Lanchkhuti where she learned to read and write. From an early age enjoyed riding horses and often made excuses to enable her to ride to neighboring villages. Her brother, Mikheil Nodia, taught her the skills of jiriti, trick riding, as a child. Nodia married at 14, becoming known as Christine Tsintsadze and subsequently had two sons and a daughter.

== Career ==
At the turn of the century, (Note: Gabunia & Gobronidze write that Tsintsadze first went to the United States in 1903; the photograph of her published by the National Parliamentary Library of Georgia has a handwritten note on the back stating it was taken in Chicago in 1907; Makhardadze stated she was first hired in 1908.) Tsintsadze was recruited by Luka Chkhartishvili as a rider for the Wild West Shows, popular at the time. Georgian riders, particularly from the Gurian region had ridden with western shows since Thomas Oliver, an acrobat who had lived in Tiflis as a child, spoke Russian, and worked as recruiter for Buffalo Bill, recruited Gurian riders for a performance in London in 1892. After the success of the London show, Joe H. Hart, returned to Georgia to recruit performers for the 1893 Chicago World's Fair. In 1905, Pawnee Bill expanded his show to include Africans, Asians, and Australians, and began billing as Pawnee Bill's Historical Wild West and Great Far East show.

The Georgian riders, who were billed as Russian Cossacks, included a handful of women riders. Besides Tsintsadze, other Georgian women who performed trick riding were Barbale Imnadze, Frida Mgaloblishvili, and Maro Zakareishvili-Kvitaishvili. Tsintsadze was the first female rider hired by Pawnee Bill for his show. When Buffalo Bill and Pawnee Bill merged their shows in 1908, they kept the best riders from both shows. Tsintsadze, a crowd favorite, was retained and continued riding with the Wild West and Great Far East show until 1912. She suffered numerous injuries from her performances and was once the victim of an attempted kidnapping.

After her return to Lanchkhuti, Tsintsadze continued to perform as a rider. She also developed a medical practice, using herbs and extracts as a folk healer, following recipes from a Karabadin, a medical guide. In the 1920s, after the Democratic Republic of Georgia was invaded by the Soviet Army, it became dangerous to have an association with the United States. Tsintsadze burned all of the evidence of her involvement with the Wild West shows.

== Death and legacy ==
Tsintsadze died in 1956 at Lanchkhuti, Georgian Soviet Socialist Republic. Though largely forgotten until scholarship rediscovered their stories in the 21st century, Georgian riders, like Tsintsadze were largely responsible for the development of trick riding in the United States, according to historians, like Dee Brown, and trick rider, Frank Dean.
