= Georgian Horsemen =

Georgian Horsemen may refer to:

- Georgian horsemen in Wild West shows
- Mkhedrioni, a Georgian paramilitary group and political organisation
