= Evpatiy Kolovrat (icebreaker) =

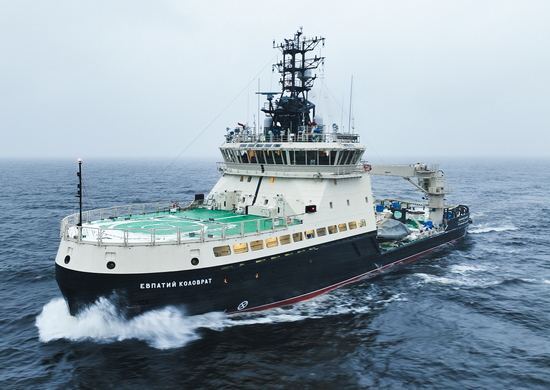

History

Russia
- Name: Evpatiy Kolovrat (Евпатий Коловрат)
- Namesake: Evpaty Kolovrat
- Owner: Russian Navy
- Ordered: 2017
- Builder: Almaz Shipbuilding Company (Saint Petersburg, Russia)
- Cost: RUB 5–6 billion
- Yard number: 800
- Laid down: 12 December 2018
- Launched: 24 November 2020
- Commissioned: 26 July 2024
- Home port: Petropavlovsk-Kamchatsky
- Identification: IMO number: 4750627
- Status: In service

General characteristics
- Type: Project 21180M icebreaker
- Displacement: 4,080 t (4,020 long tons)
- Length: 82 m (269 ft)
- Beam: 19 m (62 ft)
- Draught: 4.6 m (15 ft)
- Ice class: RMRS Icebreaker6
- Installed power: Two Kolomna 3-10D49 and one 4-10D49 diesel generators (3 × 3.5 MW)
- Propulsion: Diesel-electric; two azimuth thrusters and one fixed shaft line
- Speed: 14 knots (26 km/h; 16 mph); 2 knots (3.7 km/h; 2.3 mph) in 1 m (3.3 ft) ice
- Range: 7,600 nautical miles (14,100 km; 8,700 mi)
- Endurance: 1 month
- Complement: 28
- Aviation facilities: Helideck

Evpatiy Kolovrat (Russian: Евпатий Коловрат) is a Russian Navy icebreaker. The vessel was built by the Almaz Shipbuilding Company and entered service in July 2024.

== Development and construction ==
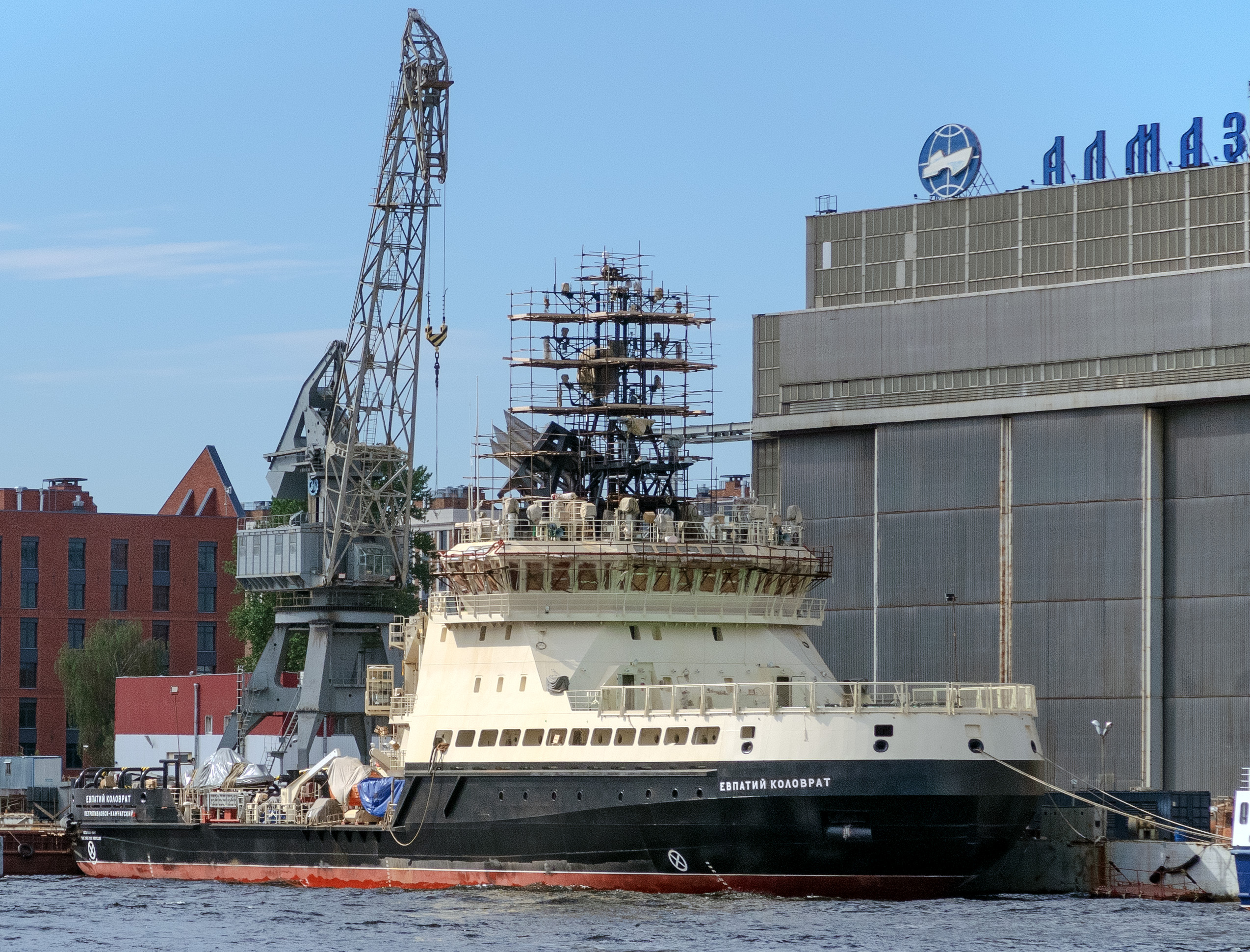
Evpatiy Kolovrat under construction in June 2022

The construction of the first Project 21180M icebreaker, estimated to cost between 5 and 6 billion rubles, was awarded to the Saint Petersburg-based Almaz Shipbuilding Company in 2017. The keel of the vessel was laid on 12 December 2018. The hull of Evpatiy Kolovrat, named after the 13th century bogatyr described in The Tale of the Destruction of Ryazan, was launched on 24 November 2020. In August 2022, the unfinished vessel was towed to the Baltic Shipyard for the installation of its mast prior to sea trials in the Gulf of Finland in December.

Evpatiy Kolovrat was scheduled to join the Russian Navy before the end of 2022, but remained in Saint Petersburg until January 2023 when the vessel departed for her home port in Petropavlovsk-Kamchatsky under tow by the Russian tugboat Sarmat. The six-month delivery voyage was completed in mid-July. In late 2023 and early 2024, the vessel was subjected to a number of trials to verify the functionality of the vessel's systems and equipment. The aviation facilities were tested using a Kamov Ka-27PS helicopter from the naval aviation of the Pacific Fleet.

The ship was delivered to the Russian Navy on 1 July 2024 and was accepted to service with the Pacific Fleet on 26 July.

== Career ==
On 7 January 2026, Evpatiy Kolovrat was dispatched from Petropavlovsk-Kamchatsky to assist a Russian freighter that had become beset in ice off Beringovsky few days earlier.

== Design ==
The 4,080-tonne (4,020-long-ton) Evpatiy Kolovrat is 82 metres (269 ft) long overall, has a beam of 19 metres (62 ft), and draws 4.6 metres (15 ft) of water. The icebreaker is served by a crew of 28.

Evpatiy Kolovrat features a diesel-electric power plant with two Kolomna 3-10D49 and one 4-10D49 diesel generators, each rated 3.5 megawatts (4,700 hp), that provide electricity for both propulsion motors and auxiliary systems. The icebreaker is propelled by three stainless steel monoblock propellers, two driven by Steerprop SP 60 PULL ARC azimuth thrusters and the third by a fixed shaft line. In addition, the vessel has a 700 kW (940 hp) bow thruster.

Evpatiy Kolovrat is classified by the Russian Maritime Register of Shipping with ice class Icebreaker6 which requires the vessel's hull to be strengthened for navigation in non-Arctic waters where ice can be up to 1.5 metres (5 ft) thick. The vessel can break 1-metre (3.3 ft) with its bow and 0.64 metres (2.1 ft) when operating stern-first. In open water, Evpatiy Kolovrat has a speed of 14 knots (26 km/h; 16 mph) and range 7,600 nautical miles (14,100 km; 8,700 mi).
