= Georgy Golitsyn =

Russian physicist (1935–2026)

- Георгий Голицын
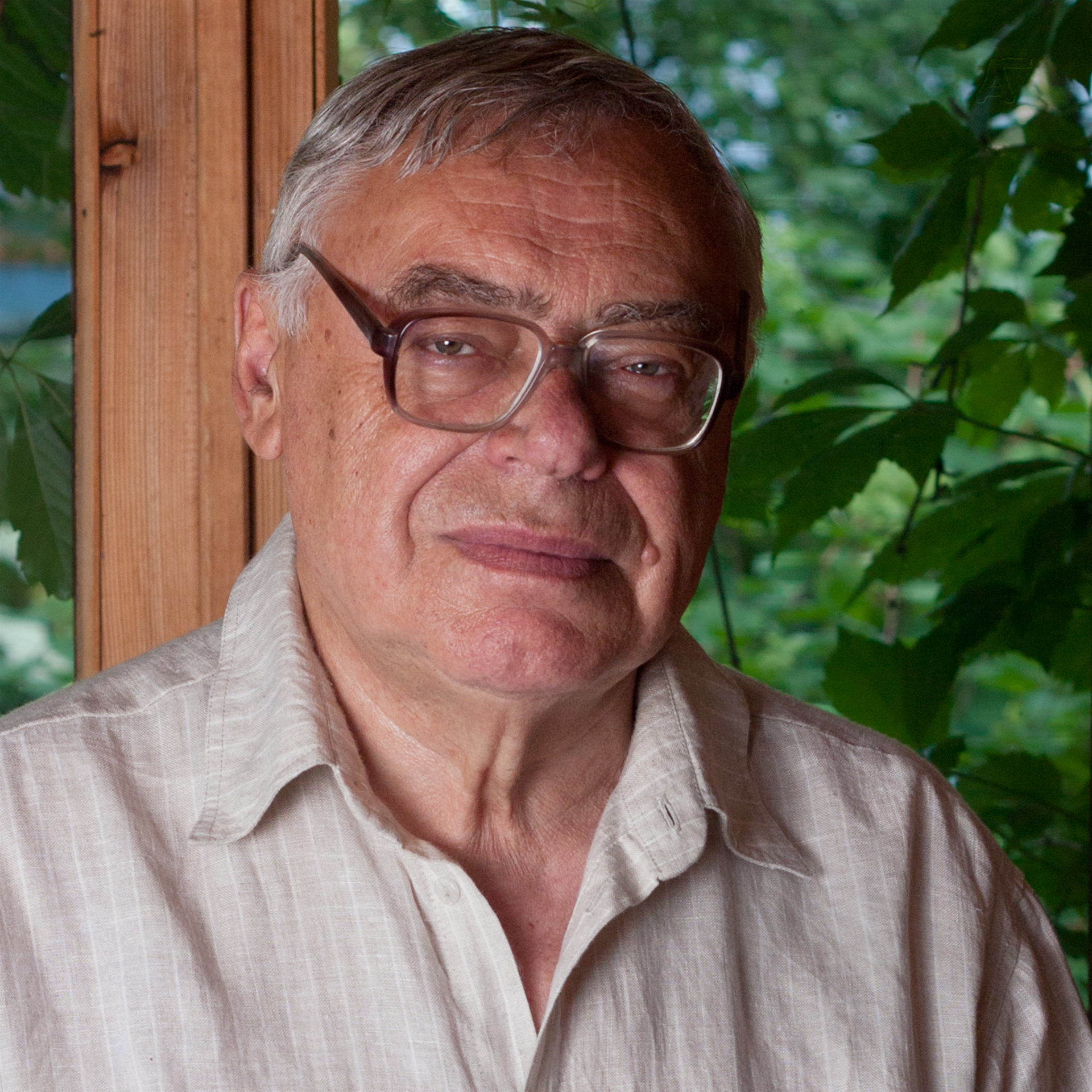
- Golitsyn in 2011
- Born: 23 November 1935; Almetyevsk, Soviet Union
- Died: 6 May 2026 (aged 91)
- Education: MSU Faculty of Physics
- Occupation: Physicist
- Employer(s): MIPT; Obukhov Institute of Atmospheric Physics
- Father: Sergei Golitsyn
- Awards: Order "For Merit to the Fatherland"; Order of Honour; Lomonosov Gold Medal; Presidential Letter of Gratitude
- Scientific career
- Fields: Atmospheric physics
- Doctoral advisor: Alexander Obukhov

Georgy Sergeyevich Golitsyn (Russian: Георгий Сергеевич Голицын; 23 January 1935 – 6 May 2026) was a Russian scientist in the field of Atmospheric Physics, full member of the Academy of Sciences of the USSR (later of Russia) from 1987, Editor-in-Chief of Izvestiya, Atmospheric and Oceanic Physics, and a member of the Academia Europaea from 2000. He was a member of the princely house of Golitsyn. His father was the Russian writer Sergei Mikhailovich Golitsyn.

== Life and career ==
Georgy Sergeyevich Golitsyn was born in Moscow on 23 January 1935. In the 1960s he studied atmospheric circulation on other planets. In 1969 he predicted the small difference between nighttime and daytime temperature on Venus and its high wind velocities. He also developed a model for study of dust storms on Mars. He was also able to show that severe forest fires in Siberia in 1915 had caused global cooling.

Golitsyn is regarded by some in Russia as the author of the nuclear winter theory, which was also developed by Vladimir Alexandrov and G.I.Stenchikov and by the authors of the so-called TTAPS study. In 1982 he became aware of the work of the Royal Swedish Academy of Sciences on the subject and attended the TTAPS review meeting with Alexandrov and Nikolai Moiseev in Cambridge, Massachusetts, in April 1983. He applied his model of dust storms to the situation that might follow a nuclear catastrophe and reported his findings at the first Meeting of the Committee of Soviet Scientists in Defence of Peace Against the Nuclear Threat in May 1983, of which he became a vice-chairman. In 1984 he participated in an expert group under the World Climate Research Programme to prepare the United Nations report “Climatic and other consequences of large-scale nuclear war”.

He was the recipient of the Russian Academy of Sciences Friedmann Prize (1990) for his works on “Study of the General Circulation of Atmosphere and Convection.” In 1997 he was named Honorary Scholar of the International Institute for Applied Systems Analysis. In 1996 he was awarded the Demidov Prize for his geostudies. In 2005 he was awarded Alfred Wegener Medal of the European Union of Geosciences. In 2011 he was named Honorary Fellow of the Royal Meteorological Society. Golitsyn was founding member of Sigma Xi Moscow.

Golitsyn died on 6 May 2026, at the age of 91.

== Books ==
- Г.С. Голицын. Введение в динамику планетных атмосфер (Russian). Л.: Гидрометеоиздат, 1973.
- Г.С. Голицын. Исследование конвекции с геофизическими приложениями и аналогиями (Russian). Л.: Гидрометеоиздат, 1980.
- М.И. Будыко, Г.С. Голицын, Ю.А. Израэль. Климатические Катастрофы (Russian). М.: Гидрометеоиздат, 1987. In English: M.I. Budyko, G.S. Golitsyn, Y.A. Izrael. Global climatic catastrophes. Berlin; New York: Springer-Verlag, 1988.
- B.M. Boubnov, G.S. Golitsyn. Convection in rotating fluids. Kluwer Academic Publishers, 1995.
- Г.С. Голицын. Динамика природных процессов (Russian). М.: Физматлит, 2004.
- Г.С. Голицын. Микро- и макромиры и гармония (Russian). М.: Квант, 2008
