= Georgian horsemen in Wild West shows =

Georgian horsemen were notable participants of the Wild West shows in the 1890s. Billed as Russian Cossacks, the riders from Georgia featured in circuses and shows well into the first half of the 20th century. Their performances, featuring trick riding and folk dance, were extremely popular and exerted significant influence on cowboys in the United States.

== History ==
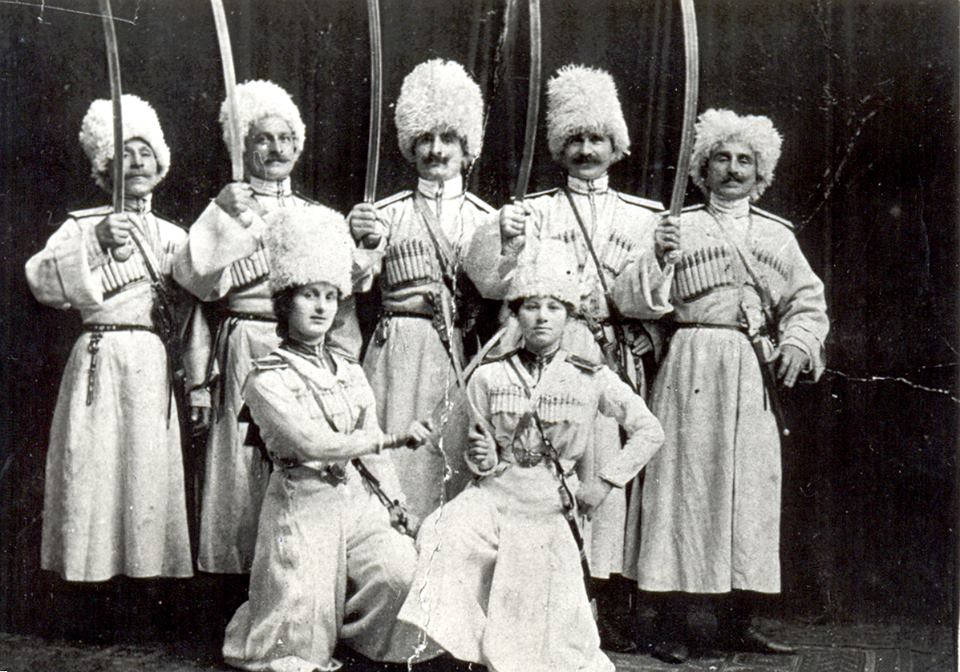
Georgian horsemen in the US.

The history of Georgian horsemen in the Wild West shows began in 1892, when they first joined the Buffalo Bill’s Wild West in England. ranging in age from 18 to 25, under the leadership of a man called Prince Ivan Makharadze. In 1893 the Gurians went to the United States, where for more than 30 years they performed under the name of Russian Cossacks in Buffalo Bill’s Wild West as well as other circuses and shows. The Gurian riders were called Cossacks for different reasons, including that Georgia was part of the Russian Empire at that time (Georgia was annexed by Imperial Russia in the 19th century and by Soviet Russia in 1921) and that the Cossacks had a colorful reputation. There is no doubt that those so-called "Cossacks" were Georgians, because almost in every case the surnames of this horsemen ended with suffixes "-dze", "-shvili", "-ia" and "-iani". These endings of Georgian surnames indicate which area of the country they originated from.

The usual performance of Georgians began with the riders, all dressed in national outfit (chokha in Georgian), taking the stage while carrying their weapons and singing. First they marched around the arena, then stopped and dismounted on mid-stage, broke into a new song and started to perform one of Georgian native dances to the accompaniment of handclaps. Sometimes this dance was executed upon a wooden platform. This act usually followed by stunt riding. The riders performed a series of manoeuvres (they were standing on their heads up, standing straight in the saddle, riding three horses simultaneously, jumping to the ground and then back, picking up small objects from the ground; one of the tricks that was very popular with the spectators was, the rider at full gallop standing on horseback and shooting) including the most risky tricks, carried out only by a chosen few. One of these tricks was when a rider removed his saddle and dismounted while riding at a full gallop and then remounted again fixing the saddle back on a horse. This trick riding style was called Dzhigitovka (a Turkic word taken to mean skilful and courageous rider).

They won widespread recognition and significantly influenced cowboys. Western historian Dee Brown notes that "Trick riding came to rodeo by way of a troupe of Cossack daredevils imported by the 101 Ranch. Intrigued by the Cossacks stunts on their galloping horses, western cowboys soon introduced variations to American rodeo. Colorful costumes seem to be a necessary part of trick riding, and it is quite possible that the outlandish western garb which has invaded rodeo area can be blamed directly on Cossacks and trick riders." The Georgian riders performance was perhaps the most popular feature of the Wild West Show. Only Indians and cowboys enjoyed similar popularity. Cossacks became an essential feature of every respectable show of that time.

In general, the Georgians' decision to travel to distant lands was based on financial hardship—touring meant profits. However, on occasion group leaders were targeted with bribes in their native villages. Their American employers paid relatively good money, up to $40–50 per month or 100 rubles. (The price of a cow in Georgia in those days was 3-5 rubles). The First World War and the Bolsheviks ended the Georgians' voyages abroad. Those Georgians who found themselves stuck in the States, mostly in Chicago, continued performing in Miller and Ringling Brothers' circuses and returned to their homeland only when the war was over. Many Georgians settled down to create typical American families and lost ties with their homeland. Hard times were ahead for those who returned to Georgia as well. On the grounds that they all were American spies, most of the riders were imprisoned and exiled by the Bolsheviks. (In 1937, Ivane Baramidze was captured at the railway station and his fate is unknown). It is known that Ivane Makharadze had a well-tamed horse, and when Bolsheviks came into Georgia and demanded his horse, he refused to give it to them. Instead, Bolsheviks captured Ivane’s son and sent him to Siberia. Ivane’s grandchild was born there. Many riders had to destroy all evidence and photographs of their trips abroad in order to survive living in the new regime's iron hands. Oftentimes various random and unrelated titles were given to these photos. One of the photos depicts the Gurians with a cowboy but the back of the picture says :"Proletarians of all the countries, unite!" (This is the political slogan by Karl Marx and Friedrich Engels). Another example is the photo taken in New York, where the Gurians sat in a car with different members of the show. The back of the picture states: "Gurian riders united with local asylees" which of course was not true. There were cases when riders were forced to sign a document in which they promised never to mention America or Europe again. The Bolsheviks confiscated all the precious gifts and presents they had been given. Usually, these things surfaced in the houses of the party nomenclature. Daughters of the rider Pavle Makharadze recalled: "They used to take different things that had been brought from the United States from the families of all riders. Finally they took a comb and a tab from our family. My mother was so horrified that she fell ill. She was always waiting for the Bolsheviks to come again". Nervous stress was too much for many – some committed suicide, others died in oblivion.

== Notable horsemen ==
Other than Ivane Makharadze, the first leader, some of the Georgians in these shows rose to particular prominence. Among these, illiterate goldsmith Luka Chkhartishvili was singled out by The Daily Tribune in 1901 for "[t]he wonderful horsemanship" that "made him one of the attractions of the show". Alexis Georgian (born Alexis Gogokhia) worked with Buffalo Bill's Wild West Show for only a few years before beginning his own group; he was later offered but refused a position as ambassador of Georgia in the United States. The Wild West show's female employees brought more grace to the Georgians' performances. There were four lady trick riders: Frida Mgaloblishvili, Kristine Tsintsadze, Maro and Barbara Zakareishvili.

== Sources ==
- Irakli Makharadze, Georgian Trick Riders in American Wild West Shows, 1890s-1920s, McFarland, 2015.
- Frank Dean, Trick and Fancy Riding (The Caxton Printers, ltd. Caldwell, Idaho 83605, 1975).
- Sarah J. Blackstone, "Buckskins, Bullets, and Business a History of Buffalo Bill’s Wild West", Contributions to the study of popular culture, number 14 (Greenwood Press, 1986).
- Dee Brown, The American West (a Touchstone Book, Simon & Schuster, New York, 1994).
- Irakli Makharadze and Akaki Chkhaidze, Wild West Georgians (Tbilisi: New Media, 2002).
- Once Upon a Time in America, Diaries of an Unknown Gurian Rider (Tbilisi, Sani Publishing, 2004).
- Nate Salsbury, "The Origin of the Wild West Show" (The Colorado Magazine, July, 1955).
- Iveria, June (#124), 1892.
- The Oracle, May 28, 1892.
- The Philadelphia Inquirer, April 9, 1893.
- The Morning Journal, May 20, 1894.
- Chicago Evening Post, June 6, 1896.
- Minneapolis Tribune, August 13, 1900.
- Arkansas Democrat, October 21, 1901.
- New York Daily Tribune, April 20, 1902.
- Tsnobis Purtsely, April 12, 1903.
- Tsnobis Purtsely, April 16, 1903.
- Kvali, April 16, 1903.
- The Neola Reporter, July 7, 1904.
- The Billboard, July 28, 1906.
- Boston Globe, June 16, 1907.
- The Hutchinson Leader, July 24, 1908.
- The Evening Times, May 25, 1912.
- The Billboard, July 20, 1912
