= Eupraxia of Ryazan =

Princess of Ryazan (died 1237)

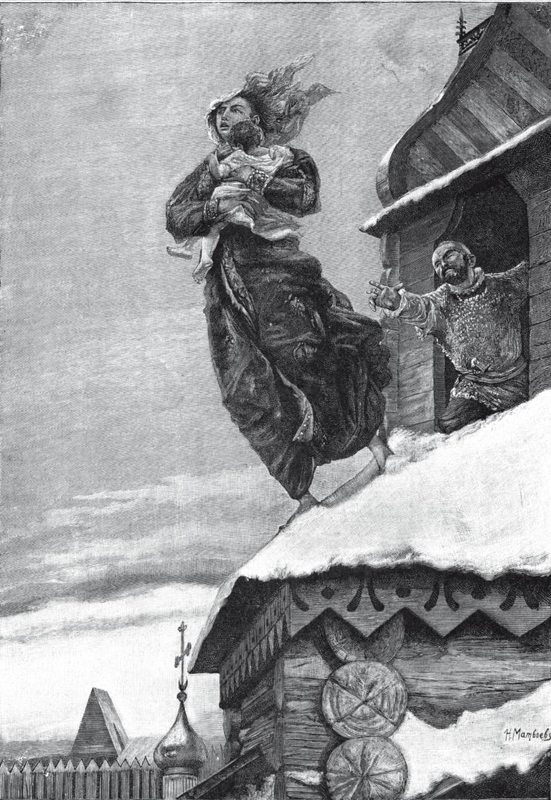
Engraving by Nikolai Matveev, 19th century

Eupraxia of Ryazan (Russian: Евпраксия Рязанская; died 1237) was a princess consort of Ryazan by marriage to Fyodor Yurevich of Ryazan. She is venerated as a local saint in the Russian Orthodox Church.

According to Russian chronicles, Prince Fyodor acted as an emissary during negotiations with Batu Khan. During these negotiations, Batu Khan demanded that he be given he be given Fyodor's wife to marry. This was an accepted practice amongst Mongol conquerors, with many precedents of conquering Mongol warriors demanding the wife of a newly conquered vassal. Prince Fyodor adamantly refused, and Batu Khan had him killed.

As told by Russian chroniclers and poets, Eupraxia subsequently committed suicide rather than to surrender to captivity of Batu Khan during the Mongol invasion of Russia. Taking her son in her arms, she jumped from a tower. The author of The Tale of the Destruction of Ryazan bewails the martyrdom of Eupraxia.

She has been portrayed in films.

== Bibliography ==
- Евпраксия, жена князя Федора Юрьевича // Энциклопедический словарь Брокгауза и Ефрона : в 86 т. (82 т. и 4 доп.). — СПб., 1890—1907.
