= Siege of Vladimir =

1238 Mongol siege in the Kievan Rus'

- Part of Mongol invasion of Kievan Rus'
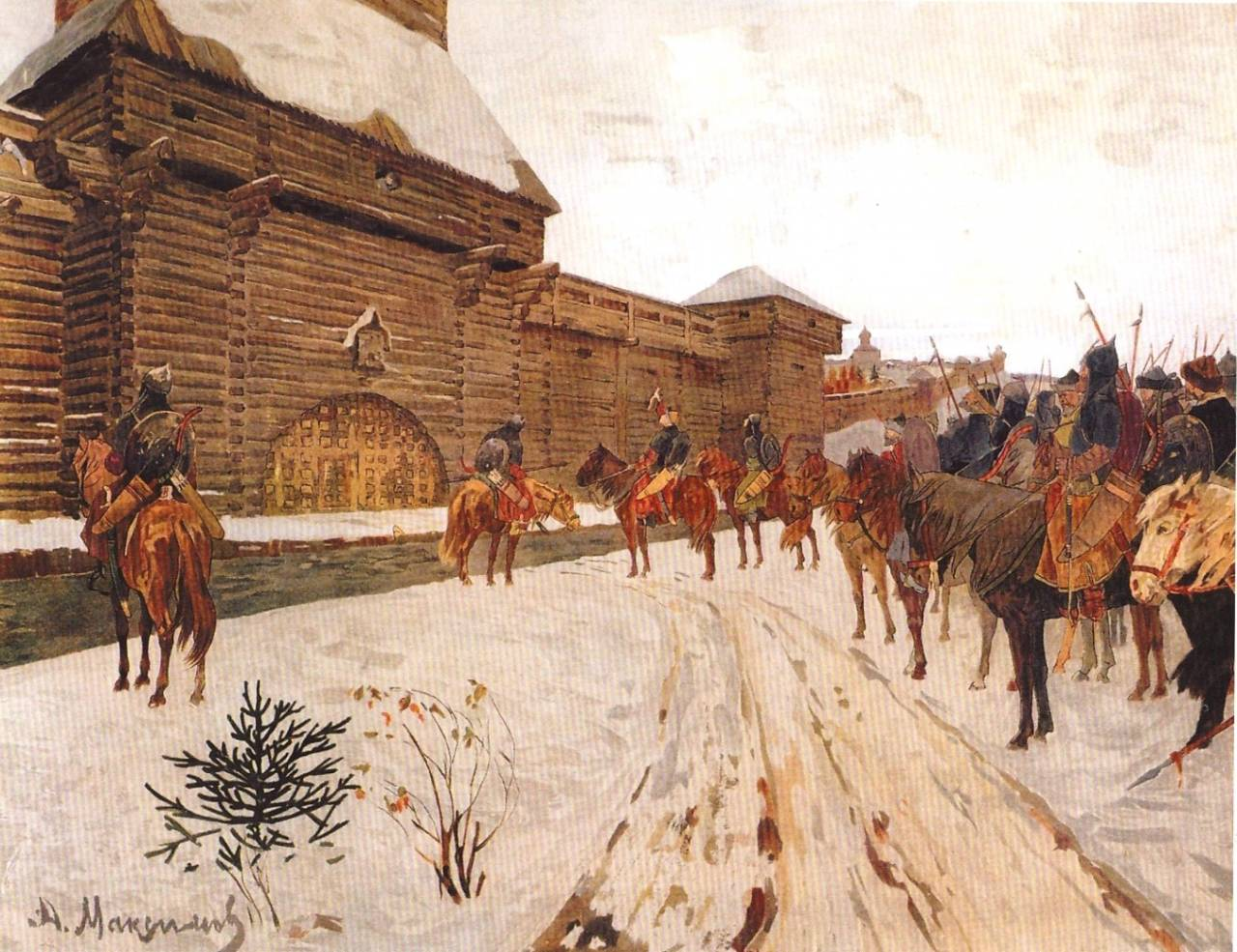
- Mongols under the walls of Vladimir.
Date	3–8 February 1238
Location	Vladimir on the Klyazma 56°08′N 40°25′E
Result	Mongol victory

Belligerents
Mongol Empire	Vladimir-Suzdal

Commanders and leaders
Batu Khan	Prince Vsevolod Yuryevich †

Strength
At least one tumen (10,000) of nomad cavalry	Few thousands civilians

Casualties and losses
Light	Entire force, survivors enslaved

The siege of Vladimir in February 1238 was part of the Mongol invasion of Kievan Rus'.

== Prelude ==
After the destruction of Ryazan on 21 December 1237, Grand Prince Yuri II left the Suzdalian capital city of Vladimir on the Klyazma in charge of his son Vsevolod and fled to Yaroslavl, seeking help from his cousins, Princes of Rostov and Novgorod. However, the speed of the Mongols was such that Kolomna fell barely 10 days after Ryazan, and Moscow only 3 weeks later, leaving the people of Vladimir to fend for themselves.

== Siege ==
The defense of Vladimir was entrusted to the Grand Prince's sons Vsevolod and Mstislav, but their forces were weak, as most of the army perished at the siege of Kolomna, hoping to stop the invaders on the border. Thus, after receiving word of the destruction of Kolomna in January 1238, Bishop Mitrofan let most of the citizens take monastic vows in order to prepare for their imminent death. After weak resistance the city was taken on 8 February 1238.

== Aftermath ==
Receiving word of the siege of Vladimir, Grand Prince Yuri II attempted to reach the city and break the siege, but his small army was surrounded and defeated at the Battle of the Sit River.
