= Evpaty Kolovrat =

Legendary Russian bogatyr

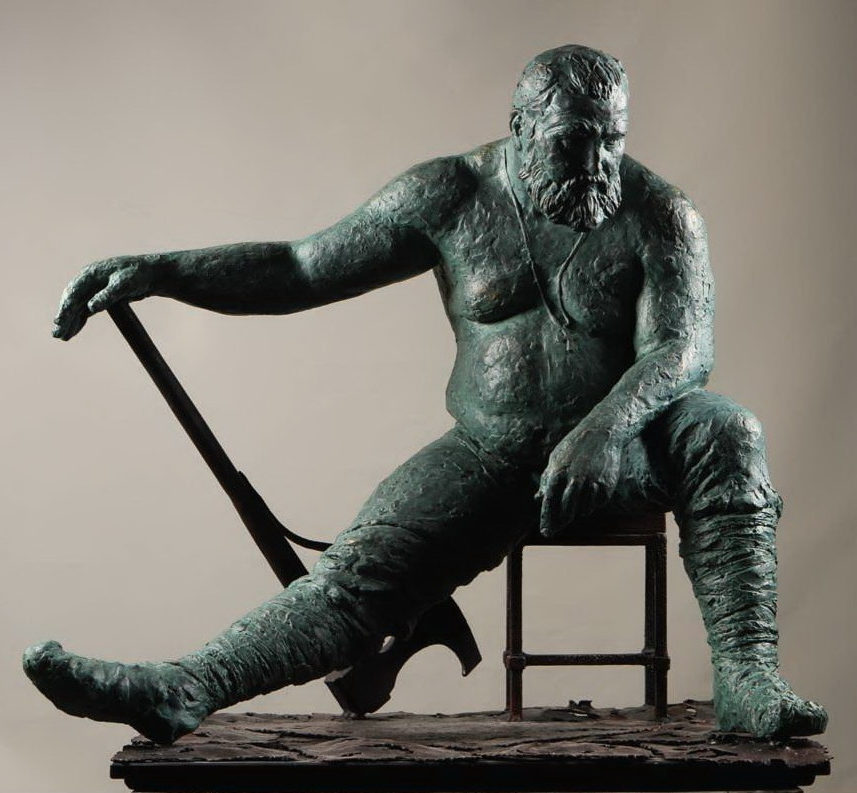
Evpaty Kolovrat by Ivan Korzhev, 2009

Evpaty Kolovrat (Russian: Евпатий Коловрат, romanized: Yevpaty Kolovrat, IPA: [jɪfˈpatʲɪj kəlɐˈvrat]; c. 1200 – 1238), a Russian bogatyr, appears in The Tale of the Destruction of Ryazan. According to the text, he tried to avenge the destruction of Ryazan a few weeks earlier in December 1237, and died while fighting the vastly more numerous army of the Mongol Golden Horde ruler Batu Khan.

== Appearance in the Tale ==
Kolovrat was visiting Chernigov at the time of the Siege of Ryazan, which occurred between 16 and 21 December 1237. Learning about the tragedy, he rushed back home, only to find the city destroyed and most its inhabitants killed. He gathered 1,700 people from his soldiers and from the survivors of the siege and went after Batu Khan with a sole purpose of avenging the carnage. Kolovrat's forces suddenly attacked the rear-guard of Batu Khan's army and annihilated it in a fierce battle. Perplexed, Batu Khan sent out a much larger force, led by his relative Khostovrul. Khostovrul promised to capture Kolovrat alive, and accordingly challenged Kolovrat to a duel. A man of extraordinary strength, Kolovrat split his opponent in half with his sword and proceeded to kill the surrounding Mongols, splitting many of them down to the saddle. Khostovrul's remaining soldiers retreated and killed Kolovrat from a distance using stone launchers. In a sign of respect for Kolovrat's bravery, Batu Khan returned his body to his soldiers and let them return home. The bodies of the princes are brought back to Ryazan by Yuri Ingvarevich and the tale ends with their burial.

== Legacy ==
The bravery and strength of Kolovrat were praised in the Russian literature, art and media by

- Nikolay Yazykov in "Evpaty" (1824)
- Lev Mei in the "Song about boyar Evpaty Kolovrat" (1859)
- Sergei Yesenin in The Tale of Evpaty Kolovrat (1912)
- Vasily Yan in Chapter 3 "Evpaty the Fierce" of the book Batu (1942)
- Sergei Golitsyn in "The legend of Evpaty Kolovrat" (1984)
- Furious (Legend of Kolovrat) film of Ivan Shuvkhovetsky and Dzhanik Fayziev (2017). He is played by Russian actor Ilya Malakov.
- Evpatiy Kolovrat, an icebreaker for the Russian Navy

The tale of Kolovrat is depicted in the 1985 Soviet short animated film The Tale of Evpaty Kolovrat and is being produced as a full-length movie.
