= Ilya Muromets (2016 icebreaker) =

Russian Navy icebreaker

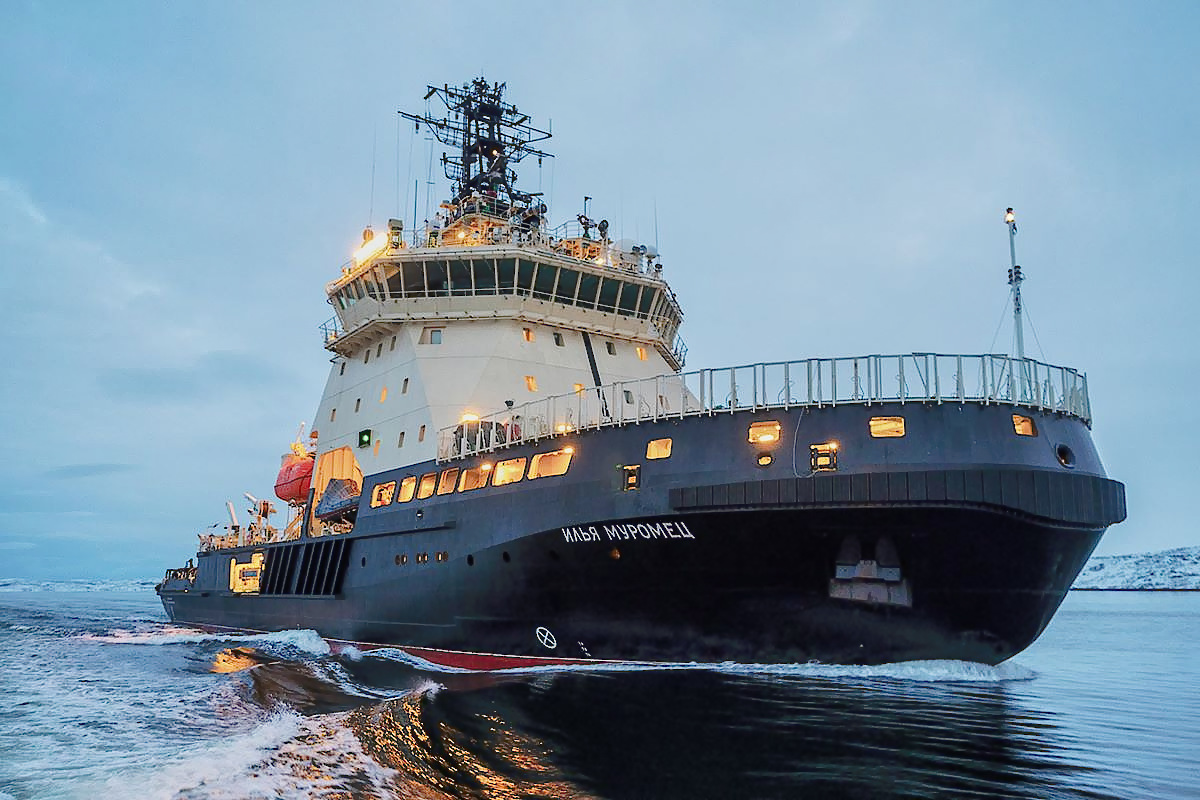
- Ilya Muromets deployed with the Northern Fleet.

History

Russia
- Name: Ilya Muromets (Илья Муромец)
- Namesake: Ilya Muromets
- Owner: Russian Navy
- Port of registry: Murmansk
- Builder: Admiralty Shipyard, Saint Petersburg, Russia
- Yard number: 02470
- Laid down: 23 April 2015
- Launched: 10 June 2016
- Commissioned: 30 November 2017
- Identification: Call sign: UARM; IMO number: 9820233; MMSI number: 273392020
- Status: In service

General characteristics
- Type: Icebreaker
- Tonnage: 5,202 GT; 1,820 DWT
- Displacement: 6,000 tons
- Length: 85 m (279 ft)
- Beam: 20 m (66 ft)
- Draft: 7 m (23 ft)
- Depth: 9.2 m (30 ft)
- Ice class: RMRS Icebreaker6
- Installed power: 4 × Wärtsilä 6L32 (4 × 3,000 kW)
- Propulsion: Diesel-electric; two Steerprop SP 120 CRP ECO azimuth thrusters (2 × 3,500 kW)
- Speed: 15 knots (28 km/h; 17 mph)
- Range: 12,000 nautical miles (22,000 km; 14,000 mi)
- Endurance: 60 days
- Capacity: 500 tons of cargo in containers
- Crew: 32
- Aviation facilities: Helideck

Ilya Muromets (Russian: Илья Муромец), Russian designation Project 21180, is a Russian icebreaker built by Admiralty Shipyard in Saint Petersburg and commissioned on 30 November 2017. She is the first icebreaker built for the Russian Navy in almost 40 years.

== Development and construction ==
In March 2014, the Ministry of Defence of the Russian Federation announced that the Russian Navy would receive a new auxiliary icebreaker as part of the ongoing fleet renewal program. The vessel, designed by the Russian Vympel Design Bureau as Project 21180, would be the first new military icebreaker built in Russia since the Soviet era.

The construction of the new auxiliary icebreaker was awarded to Saint Petersburg-based Admiralty Shipyard. The keel of the vessel was laid on 23 April 2015 and she was launched as Ilya Muromets on 10 June 2016. After completing sea trials, the vessel was officially delivered to the Russian Navy in a flag-raising ceremony on 30 November 2017.

Ilya Muromets is the fourth icebreaker named after the Russian folk hero: the first was a 1915-built steam-powered icebreaker later captured by the French; the second a 1941-built steam-powered icebreaker acquired from Germany as war reparations; the third a 1965-built diesel-electric Dobrynya Nikitich-class icebreaker.

While initially the 6,000-ton Ilya Muromets was intended to be the lead ship of a series of four icebreakers, the Ministry of Defence decided not to begin the serial production of the Project 21180 due to high cost of the vessels. Instead, it will focus on building smaller Project 21180M icebreakers with about two thirds of the displacement and more limited functionality compared to the bigger vessel.

== Design ==
Although the 6,000-ton Ilya Muromets is the largest icebreaker ever built for the Russian Navy, she is somewhat smaller than the civilian icebreakers operated by Atomflot, Rosmorport and Sovcomflot. In terms of size and general layout, the 85-metre (279 ft) vessel is comparable to the civilian Project MPSV06 multi-purpose salvage vessels with a working deck aft, deckhouse amidships and a helideck rated for Kamov Ka-27 helicopter. Like her civilian counterparts, Ilya Muromets is also equipped with a towing winch and stern notch for escorting other ships in ice conditions.

Like most icebreakers today, Ilya Muromets has an integrated diesel-electric propulsion system where the main generators provide electricity for both propulsion and auxiliary systems. The vessel's power plant consists of four 3,000-kilowatt (4,000 hp) 6-cylinder Wärtsilä 6L32 medium-speed diesel generating sets. Ilya Muromets is one of the few ice-going vessels propelled by contra-rotating propellers: the vessel has two electrically-driven 3,500-kilowatt (4,700 hp) Steerprop SP 120 CRP ECO azimuthing Z-drive propulsion units with five blades on the pulling and four blades on the pushing propeller. This configuration provides higher propulsion efficiency at a cost of added mechanical complexity. In addition, the vessel has a bow thruster for maneuvering.

Ilya Muromets is classified by the Russian Maritime Register of Shipping. Her ice class, Icebreaker6, requires the vessel to be capable of operating in level ice with a thickness of 1 metre (3.3 ft) in a continuous motion and her hull strengthened for navigation in non-Arctic waters where ice can be up to 1.5 metres (5 ft) thick.
