= Battle of Voronezh River =

Battle in 1237 in Kievan Rus'

- Part of the Mongol invasion of Kievan Rus'
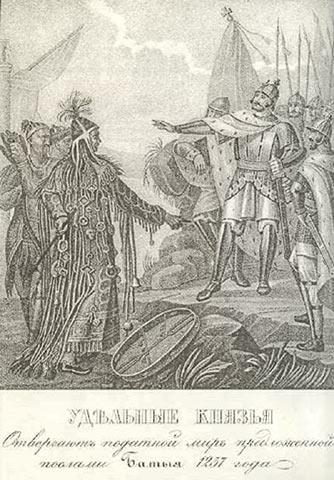
- The Ryazan's prince rejects the Mongols’ tribute demand.
Date	December 1237
Location	Voronezh (river)
Result	Mongol victory

Belligerents
Mongol Empire	Principality of Ryazan

Commanders and leaders
Batu Khan; Subutai	Yuriy Igorevich of Ryazan; Roman Ingvarevich of Kolomna

Strength
Several tumen of nomad cavalry	A few hundred cavalry and no more than 1,000–2,000 militia on foot

Casualties and losses
Light	Heavy, but some units escaped to Kolomna

The Battle of Voronezh River happened during the Mongol invasion of Kievan Rus'. The Principality of Ryazan was the first to be attacked.

== Opposing forces ==
Size and composition of both armies can be estimated based on contemporary chronicles. Contemporary Mongol sources describe Batu as invading with 12–14 tumens, which would give him a nominal strength of 120,000–140,000 men, mostly nomad cavalry archers. However, tumens were often at less than full strength, some elite units with as few as 1,000 horsemen.

On the Rus' side, contemporary sources mention only five princes by name, each of whom would be accompanied by his Druzhina, a small retinue of heavy cavalry. The princely retinue surpassed the Mongolian army in armament, both offensive and defensive. Massively heavy armor was used. However, these squads, as a rule, did not exceed the number of several hundred men, and were unsuitable for united actions under a single command.

At the same time, the main part of the Rus' army was the militia infantry. It was inferior to the nomads in armament and the ability to own it. The militia used axes and hunting spears ("rogatina"). Swords were rarely used, and they had no armor other than plain clothes and fur hats.

For the infantry, consisting of poorly armed peasants and tradesmen, numbers are uncertain. The only specific numbers mentioned for the Rus' are 1,700 men of Evpaty Kolovrat(The Tale of the Destruction of Ryazan) and 3,000 men under Voivode Dorozh(Battle of the Sit River). However, these were exceptionally large numbers for Rus' standards at the time. In 1242, Prince Alexander Nevski in Novgorod could muster no more than 1,000 Druzhina and 2,000 militia for the Battle on the Ice. So, it is safe to estimate that, on average, a Rus' prince had hundreds of warriors in his retinue, rather than thousands.

== Battle ==
After receiving envoys of Batu Khan and sending them to their overlord, Yuri II of Vladimir, border princes of Ryazan, Murom, and Pronsk gathered their forces and made a stand on the river Voronezh, waiting for reinforcements from Vladimir. They received none, and their small force was quickly scattered.

== Aftermath ==
After the battle, Prince Yuri Igorevich retreated to Ryazan, while his nephew Prince Roman took some of his men north to Kolomna and joined the army of Vladimir-Suzdal.
