= Sergei Golitsyn =

Russian writer

Sergei Mikhailovich Golitsyn (Russian: Серге́й Миха́йлович Голи́цын; 14 March [O.S. 1 March] 1909 – 7 November 1989) was a Russian writer.

== Biography ==
Golitsyn was born on 14 March 1909 at an estate in the Tula guberniya. His father was prince Mikhail Vladimirovich Golitsyn (1873–1942), a member of the powerful Russian Golitsyn (or Galitzine) family, and his mother was Anna Sergeyevna (née Lopukhina; 1880–1972). He had also five sisters and one brother.

During the repressions of the 1920s and 1930s, a large number of his relatives were targeted. At various times were arrested (and many were later shot or perished in imprisonment) his grandfather, V.M. Galitsyn, his father, his older brother Vladimir, one brother-in-law and numerous cousins. Later he recalled these years in his Memoirs of a Survivor: The Golitsyn Family in Stalin's Russia, an account of how revolution dramatically transformed life for one of Russia's elite families. Written in secret and published only in 1990, after his death it describes the impact of the revolution upon his family, whilst also painting a picture of life in Russia as Bolshevism turned to Stalinism.

After finishing school in 1927, having decided to become a writer, he enrolled to Higher Literature Courses (later to become the Maxim Gorky Literature Institute). After graduating in 1929, he was briefly arrested.

Although his first children stories were published in the 1930s in various journals, he could not support himself from writing and worked as a topographer including to the building of the Moscow Canal.

In 1934, he married Klavdia Mikhailovna Babykina (1907–1980), with whom he had three children – Georgy (b. 1935), Mikhail (b. 1936) and Sergei (1938–1939).

On 3 July 1941 he was mobilized as a topographer at the sapper troops. He made all the way to Berlin and was discharged in 1946. For his service he received the Order of the Patriotic War IInd class, the Order of the Red Star and several medals.

After the war worked as a geodesist engineer at the State Planning Institute.

Since 1959 he lived as a professional writer.

He died on 7 November 1989 of a heart attack. He is buried in the churchyard of the village Lyubets (Vladimir Oblast).

== Work ==
He is best known in the former USSR as an author of children's books inspired by the life of Soviet Pioneers ("I want to be a topographer" (1953), "Forty Explorers" (1959) etc.)

He also wrote children's books on historical themes and biographies of Russian Painters (V.A. Polenov, V.A.Favorsky). In the village of Lyubets, where he owned a summer house, he established a folk-art museum.

Since 1979 he worked on his memoirs "Memoirs of a Survivor", published in 1990 by his sons.
