= Vasily Yan =

Russian writer (1875–1954)

Vasily Yan (Russian: Василий Ян; 4 January 1875 [O.S. 23 December 1874], Kiev, Russian Empire – August 5, 1954, Zvenigorod, Moscow Oblast), also spelled "Vassily Yan" (or "Ian") or just "V. Yan", was the pen name of Vasily Grigoryevich Yanchevetsky (Russian: Василий Григорьевич Янчевецкий), a Russian and Soviet writer, author of famous historic novels.

== Biography ==
Born in Kiev to a family of teachers, his father was from an Orthodox Christian priests family, who had graduated from seminary and taught Latin and Greek at the University Gymnasium.

In 1897, Yan graduated from the historical and philological faculty of St. Petersburg University. Impressions of a two-year tour of Russia form the backbone of his book Notes of a Pedestrian (1901). In 1901–1904 he served as inspector of wells in Turkestan, where he studied Oriental languages and the lives of local people. During the Russian-Japanese war, he was a military correspondent for the St. Petersburg News Agency (SPA). In 1906–1913, he taught Latin at the first Petersburg Gymnasium. As an organizer of the scouts he met with Colonel Robert Baden-Powell, who came to Russia in 1910.

In the autumn of 1910 Vasily Yan introduced the magazine Pupil. In 1913, he worked as a correspondent in Turkey for SPA. In 1914, with the beginning of the First World War, he became SPA's military correspondent in Romania. In 1918–1919 he worked in the press service of Aleksandr Kolchak in Siberia. After the establishment of Soviet power in Achinsk he worked as a teacher, correspondent and director of schools in Uryanhae (Tuva). He then became the editor of the leading newspaper The Power of labour in Minusinsk. That was when he first adopted the pseudonym Yan. In 1923, he moved to Moscow.

== Works ==
- "Notes of a Pedestrian", 1901
- story "Story of Captain", 1907
- story "Soul", 1910
- "Raising of the Übermensch", 1910
- "What You Need to do for the Children of St. Petersburg", 1911
- novel "The Afghan Emerald"
- story "Phoenician Ship", 1931
- story "The Lights at Barrows", 1932
- story "Spartacus", 1933
- story "Hammermen", 1933
- The Mongol Invasion (trilogy):
  - story "Genghis Khan", 1939 (the USSR State Prize in 1942)
  - story "Baty", 1942
  - story "To Last Sea", published 1955
- "Kids Commander"
- "The Mystery of Lake Kara-Standard"
- "Yermak's Campaign"
- "On the Wings of Courage"
- "Melters of the Vandzh"
- "In the Sands of the Karakum"

Falsification of the novel "Ermak's Campaign" was carried out in 2011 by "Leningrad publishing house" (ЛЕНИЗДАТ). In fact this novel is Lydia Charskaya's "Formidable squad" (Грозная дружина) published in 1909. The circulation of the fake "Lenizdat" was only 7050 copies. Since the falsification was successful, it is referred to as the real work of Vasily Yan.
