= Lyubets =

Lyubets Любец
- Selo
- Location within Vladimir Oblast Location within Russia
- Coordinates: 56°19′N 41°12′E
- Country: Russia
- Region: Vladimir Oblast
- District: Kovrovsky District
- Time zone: UTC+3:00

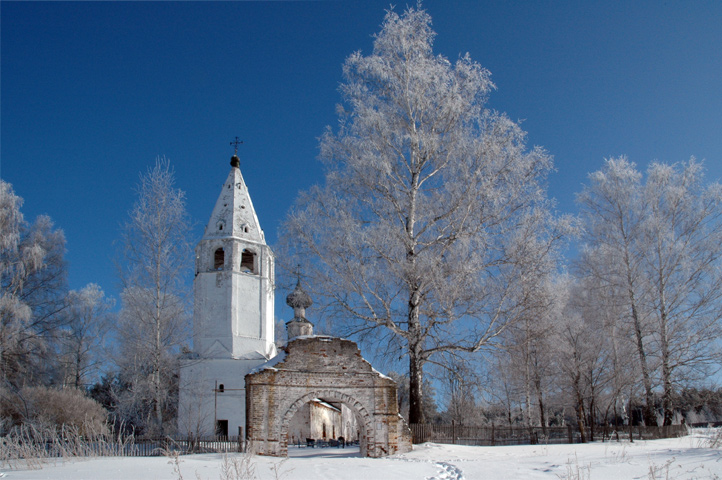

Lyubets (Russian: Любец) is a rural locality (a selo) in Novoselskoye Rural Settlement, Kovrovsky District, Vladimir Oblast, Russia. The population was 14 as of 2010.

== Geography ==
Lyubets is located on the right bank of the Klyazma River, 11 km southwest of Kovrov (the district's administrative centre) by road. Pogost is the nearest rural locality.
