= Yuri of Ryazan =

Grand Prince of Ryazan (1235–1237)

Yuri Igorevich
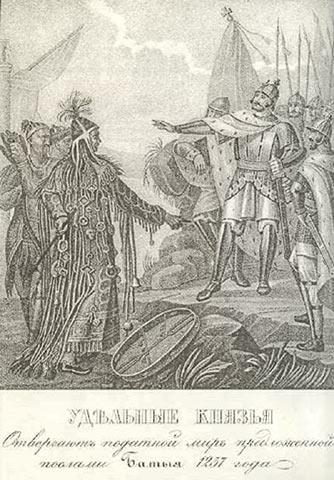

Grand Prince of Ryazan
- Reign: 1235–1237
- Predecessor: Ingvar Igorevich
- Successor: Ingvar Ingvarevich
- Died: December 21, 1237; Ryazan
- Spouse: Agripina
- Issue: Fedor of Zaraisk
- House: Sviatoslavichi
- Father: Igor Glebovich of Ryazan
- Religion: Eastern Orthodox

Yury or Yuri Ingvarevich (Russian: Юрий Ингваревич; died December 21, 1237) also known as Yuri Igorevich, was Grand Prince of Ryazan from 1235 until his death in 1237 during the siege of Ryazan as part of the Mongol invasions.

== Life ==
According to The Tale of the Destruction of Ryazan, after receiving the envoys of Batu Khan in December 1237, he sent his son Fedor to negotiate with Batu, but the envoys were massacred for their defiance, the first Russian martyrs of the Mongol invasion of Rus'.

After sacrificing his son in defense of his homeland, Prince Yuri led his army in the Battle of Voronezh River and finally perished during the destruction of Ryazan. He was succeeded by his nephew Ingvar Ingvarevich, who reigned until 1252.

== In popular culture ==
He is a supporting character in the Russian historical fantasy film Furious (2017). He is played by Russian actor Aleksei Serebryakov.
