= Jigit =

Turkic word for skillful and brave person

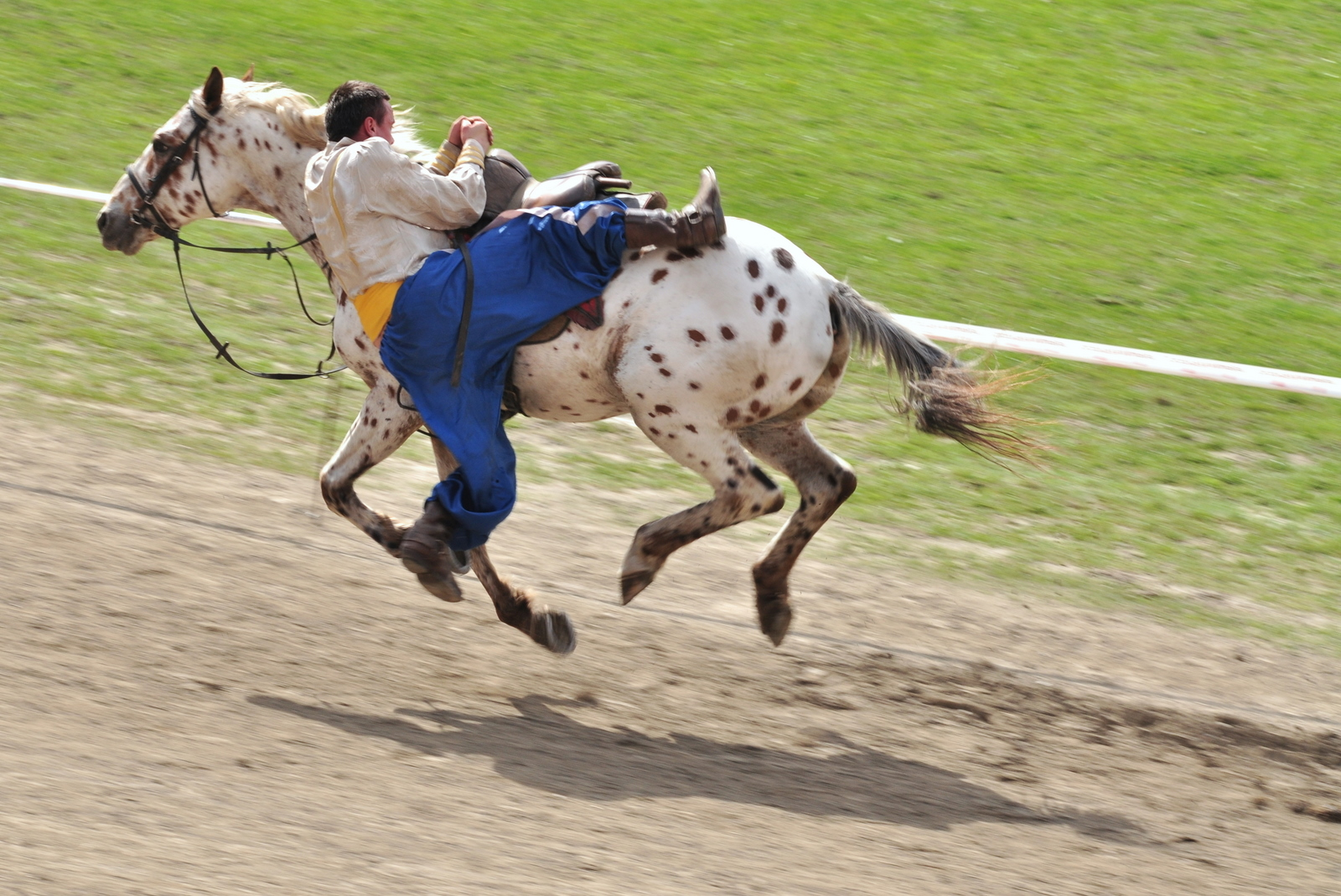
Modern horse and rider

Jigit (also spelled as Dzhigit, yigit, zhigit or igid, jirit) is a word used in the Caucasus and Central Asia to describe a skillful and brave equestrian, or a brave person in general. The word is of Turkic origin.

In the Caucasus, Jigit was the traditional name given to horsemen distinguished by their courage, endurance, skill in handling a horse with great agility, and mastery of all kinds of weapons. Hence the term jigitovka, meaning wild or daring horseback riding (trick riding, exercises in horsemanship), during which the rider demonstrates every kind of agility: he jumps onto the saddle with both feet and, standing upright, fires a weapon; hides beneath the horse’s belly; at full gallop picks up various small objects from the ground; and, also at full gallop, brings the horse to a halt and makes it lie down, using the animal as cover for himself, and so on. Jigitovka was adopted from the Circassians by our Cossacks of the North Caucasus, and they soon equaled their teachers in this art. In Central Asian territories, the term jigit is applied to Kyrgyz and other nomads serving with Russian troops as guides, messengers, and scouts.. Dzhigitovka is widespread among the peoples of the Caucasus, Central Asia, Kazakhstan, and the Cossacks.

Since the early 19th century jigitovka has been demonstrated in circuses and horse sport competitions, and made its way to popular Western culture – for instance, Cossacks (actually Georgian horsemen from Guria) demonstrated jigitovka as part of Buffalo Bill's Wild West Show. Jigitovka was also used in the training of cavalry forces in the Russian Empire and USSR. Modern jigitovka as a circus performance includes complex stunts usually performed by a group of riders.

== Equestrian Jigitovka ==
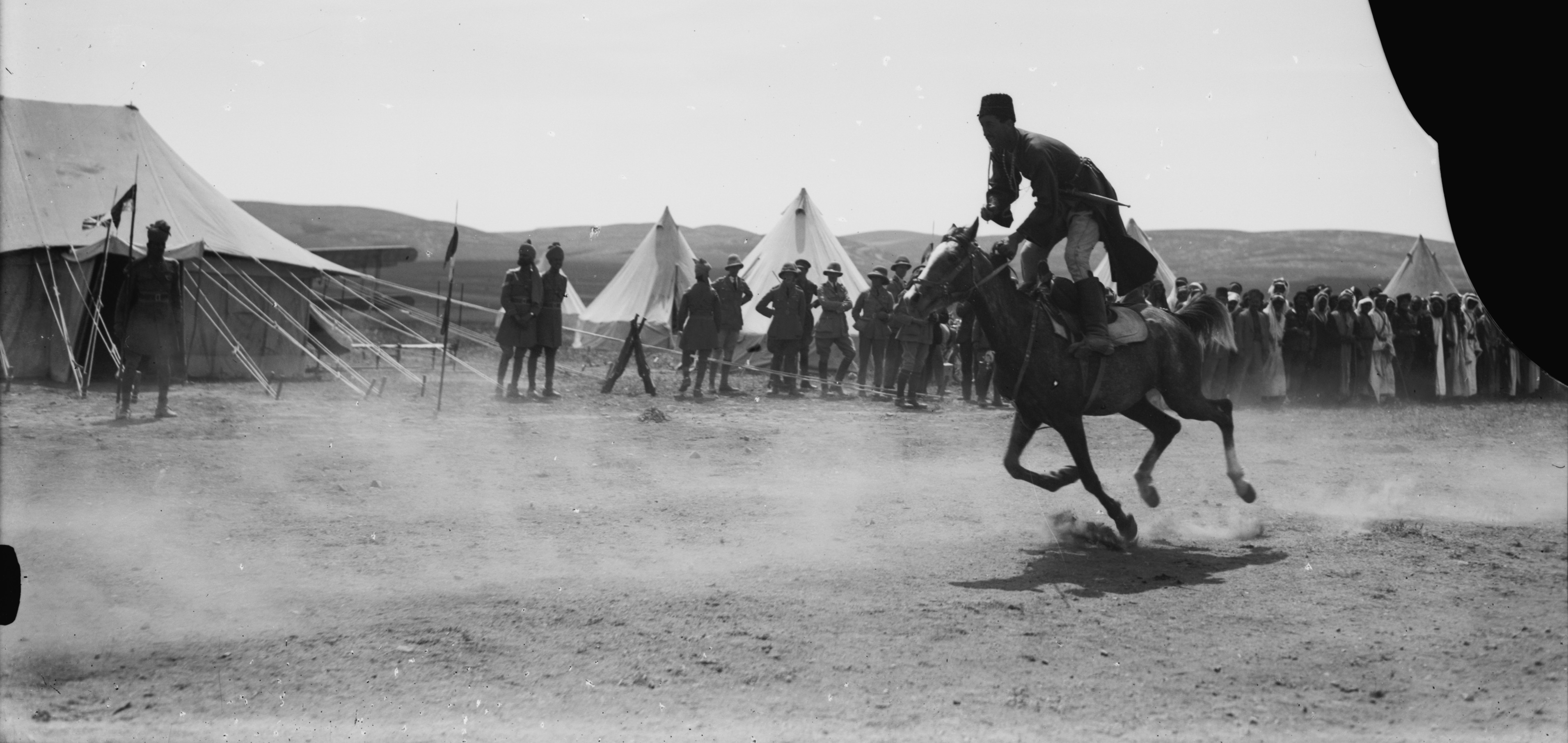
A Circassian performing jigitovka in Transjordan

In 2016 jigitovka was officially recognized as a sporting discipline in the Russian Federation.
