= Siege of Ryazan =

1237 Mongol invasion of the Principality of Ryazan

- Part of the Mongol invasion of Kievan Rus'
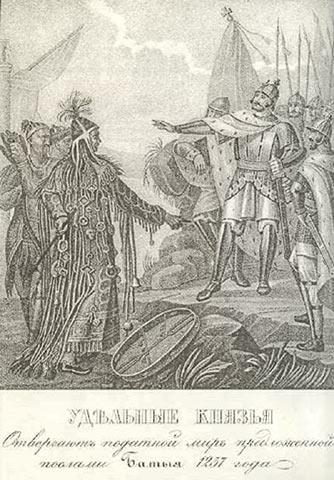
- Ryazan's prince rejects the Mongols' tribute demand.
Date	December 16–21, 1237
Location	Staraya Ryazan (Old Ryazan), close to Spassk-Ryazansky 54°24′19″N 40°25′27″E
Result	Mongol victory

Belligerents
Mongol Empire	Principality of Ryazan

Commanders and leaders
Batu Khan	Yuriy Igorevich †

The siege of Ryazan happened in Ryazan on December 1237 during the Mongol invasion of Kievan Rus'. Ryazan was the capital of the Principality of Ryazan, and was the first Kievan Rus' city to be besieged by the Mongol invaders under Genghis Khan's grandson Batu Khan.

== Prelude ==
In the autumn of 1237, the Mongol Horde led by Batu Khan invaded the Rus' principality of Ryazan. The Prince of Ryazan, Yuriy Igorevich, asked Yuriy Vsevolodovich, the prince of Vladimir, for help, but did not receive any.

== Siege ==
The Mongols defeated the vanguard of the Ryazan army at the Voronezh River and on December 16, 1237 besieged the capital of the principality (this site is now known as Old Ryazan, Staraya Ryazan, and is situated some 50 km from the modern city of Ryazan). The townspeople repelled the first Mongol attacks. The Mongols then used catapults to destroy the city's fortifications. On December 21, Batu Khan's troops stormed the walls, plundered Ryazan, killed Prince Yuriy and his wife, executed nearly all of the city's inhabitants, and burned the city to the ground. "But God saved the Bishop, for he had departed the same moment when the troops invested the town."

== Casualties ==
The population of Ryazan in the 13th century is hard to estimate. Archaeological excavations on the site of Old Ryazan in 1915 and 1979 uncovered 97 severed heads on the site of the former church, and 143 bodies in several mass graves, all of whom had met violent deaths during the sack of the city.

== Aftermath ==
The writer of the Rus' chronicle described the aftermath of the battle with the words "There was none left to groan and cry". The city of Old Ryazan was completely destroyed and was never rebuilt, though archeologist M. W. Thompson wrote "Life was soon renewed. The churches and fortifications were restored and new houses built. In the fourteenth century, however, the capital of the princedom was for several reasons, including repeated raids by Tartars because of its proximity to the steppe, transferred to Pereyaslavl-Ryazansky (renamed Ryazan in 1778). The old town gradually became deserted."

After the destruction of Ryazan, Batu Khan's horde pushed on into the principality of Vladimir-Suzdal.

== See also ==
- The Tale of Batu’s Capture of Ryazan
