= The Tale of the Destruction of Ryazan =

Russian literary work

The Tale of the Destruction of Ryazan (by Batu) (Russian: Повесть о разорении Рязани Батыем, romanized: Povest' o razorenii Riazani Batyem) is a Russian literary work about the capture of the city of Ryazan by the Mongols in 1237. It is compiled from earlier manuscripts.

== Historical background ==
Before the events described in the tale, the Principality of Ryazan operated as a rather prosperous border settlement-area - actively engaged in trade along the rivers Oka and Volga to the east and by the river Don and the Black Sea to the south. Archeological evidence suggests lively trading relationships with the Northern Caucasus and with peoples of the Black Sea coast. Crafts were relatively well developed, especially famous being Ryazan jewelry-making. The principality often became involved in conflicts with neighboring Chernigov and Vladimir; by the time of the Mongol invasion their relationships were relatively peaceful.

Ryazan was first mentioned in a chronicle of 1096 in connection with the move of Prince Oleg I Sviatoslavovich of Chernigov (also known as Oleg Gorislavovich) to Ryazan after he was rejected in Smolensk. The ruling family of Ryazan started with Oleg Gorislavovich's younger brother—Yaroslav Sviatoslavovich of Chernigov, who became Prince of Murom and Ryazan (r. 1127–1129).

As a border principality, Ryazan became one of the first Rus' polities conquered by Batu Khan (a military leader of the Mongol forces and a grandson of Genghis Khan) who led a united army of various nomadic steppe peoples. Russian texts referred to the invaders as "tatars" (татаре - standard modern Russian: татары). According to various chronicles and this military tale, Batu attacked Ryazan in 1237.

== History of the text ==
This military tale survived in several sixteenth and the seventeenth century redactions and is thought to be a part of a miscellany that was composed and revised by the clergy of the Church of St. Nikholas of Zaraisk. According to the legend, the church is located on the spot where the princess Eupraxy killed herself. Given a form of a military tale, the later version of The Tale of Batu's Capture of Ryazan is a fictionalized account with some historical inaccuracies suggesting that the Tale was composed sometimes after the described events and was subsequently further edited. Tracing its provenance, textual analysis, and dating of various redactions have been conclusively resolved by Soviet scholars. Originally, The Tale of Batu's Capture of Ryazan was a part of a cycle dedicated to the icon of St Nicholas of Zarazsk. This cycle included several parts or tales, each with a differing thematic emphasis. Having absorbed details from these various parts, a more popular version ---a military tale—still manifests stylistic and thematic heterogeneity. The Tale of St Nicholas of Zarazsk (in 1225) and The Tale of Batu's Capture of Ryazan (in 1237) in their earlier serving manuscripts versions are dated to the second third of the sixteenth century. For the first time, The Tale of Batu's Capture of Ryazan was published by I. P. Sakharov in 1841. It was based on the late sixteenth century redaction. The whole cycle was published by D. C. Likhachev in 1947. In his canonical study, Likhachev (basing it on the research by V. L. Komarovich) dated, analyzed, and classified 34 variants dating from the sixteenth-eighteenth centuries. Surviving in the earliest dating redactions, the first cycle-variant of The Tale of St Nicholas of Zarazsk is centered on the wonder-working icon of St Nicholas. The subject matter of transferring sacred objects (crosses, icons, relics) was very common in medieval literature. After the icon was brought to Ryazan, the Mongol invasion described in the second tale began. The second tale (The Tale of Batu's Capture of Ryazan proper) was about initial unsuccessful negotiations, a battle and then ransacking of Ryazan and finally the return of the Prince Igor to his destroyed homeland. The final part The Encomium of the Princely House of Ryazan included a long lament, added much later as Zenkovsky points out, and a panegyric to Ryazan princes. The final part would have been the “family tree of the “keepers” of the icon.

== The Tale of St Nicholas of Zarazsk ==
As is known from earlier redactions, this first tale located the icon of Saint Nicholas precisely in a banquet room of the church of St. James in the city of Korsun (Chersoneses). According to the legends, the icon was from the same church where the Grand Prince Vladimir (I) Sviatoslavovich was baptized; the tale gave details of his miraculous baptism and a feast celebrating the marriage between the Russian Prince and the Byzantine princess Anna. This was followed by an account of “moving” or ”traveling” of the icon as it was escorted by Eustathius from Korsun (корсунянин Евстафий) who was the icon's “keeper”. The tale about this wonder-working icon was filled with wondrous interventions of St. Nicholas who directed Eustathius around the dangerous Polovtsian lands to the Russian principality of Ryazan. Saint Nicholas himself orchestrated the arrival of the icon into Russian lands sending visions to both Eustathius and to the Prince Fedor of Ryazan who came to meet the icon. Likhachev explains this part as an earlier type of the story that traditionally interpreted every event as foreshadowing upcoming catastrophes, Ryazan's destruction being the divine retribution "казнию божиею". According to medieval scribe, this was a typical causality. The tale about the wonder-working icon described events that were professed to Fedor (his marriage and child). The icon's story continued in the second part The Tale of Batu's Capture of Ryazan. The icon's name “икона чудотворца Николы Заразская” is specifically associated with the location of the death of Fedor's wife and son. Icon's story extended beyond this Ryazan episode and the icon was moved to Kolomna in 1513. However, as Likhachev suggests, the name of the city is most likely related to the topographical peculiarities of the region (it has many hollows овраги-зарази). Another detail surviving in some redactions reveals traces of a local legend connected to a name of Fedor's servant Aponitsa (who survived and managed to bury the body of Fedor Yurievich secretly). Likhachev suggests a link to a name of a village settlement nearby Zaraisk called Aponichishi (Апоничищи).

== The Tale of Batu’s Capture of Ryazan ==
=== Plot summary ===
The tale proper begins as a chronicle-like entry: “Within twelve years after bringing the miraculous icon of St. Nicholas from Kherson, the godless Emperor Batu invaded the Russian land with a great multitude of his Tatar warriors and set up a camp of the river Voronezh in the vicinity of the principality of Riazan.” (Note: В лето 6745. В фторое на десят лето по принесении чюдотворнаго образа ис Корсуня прииде безбожный царь Батый на Русскую землю со множество вой татарскими, и ста на реце на Воронеже близ Резанскиа земли.) Then a betrayal of Riazan by its neighbors is narrated. This is significant because it points out to the theme of disunity between the Rus' princes, as a source of Kievan Rus' many misfortunes. The Riazan Prince Yury Igorevich calls for an assembly. After a closer historical investigation, this meeting would have been impossible to take place. The council included Prince Vsevolod who could not have present, because he was already dead at the time of the council and the battle. Possibly, in an effort to simplify the story and add to the pathos, all of the mentioned princes were made brothers. (Note: Likhachev explains: "The P[rince] of Murom died in 1228, Vsevolod Pransky - father of Kir Mikhail Pransky, mentioned later - died even earlier, in 1208. Yuriy called also Oleg Krasniy and Gleb Kolomensky (the latter is mentioned not in all lists and is not known in the annals). Kinship relations of all these princes are epically close, all of them are made brothers. In the subsequent fight all these princes perish, though it is known about Oleg Krasniy (not really a brother, but a nephew of Yuriy) that he was a captive of Batu till 1252 and died in 1258.") The Grand Prince Yury Igorevich sends to Batu his son Fedor Yurevich with gifts of supplication. The merciless Batu accepts the gifts and gives a false promise not to invade Riazan. His lust fueled by storied about Prince Fedor's beautiful wife of Byzantine noble blood, Batu demands for himself concubines from Riazan's ruling families. Angered by Fedor's proud refusal, he puts the Prince and his retinue to death. One servant survives to tell the story to Fedor's wife Eupraxy. She is seized with grief and throws herself from the window with the child in her arms. Great Prince Yury Ingarevich prepares for the battle, which takes place on the border of the principality of Riazan. The outnumbered Russians fight fiercely and bravely but they lose the battle. Many receive martyr-like deaths. The accursed Batu successfully storms the city and kills all of its inhabitants. A small detachment led by Evpaty Kolovrat hurries to Riazan from Chernigov (where it was at the time of the battle with Batu). Engaging in an uneven battle, Evpaty Kolovrat manages to significantly undermine the Tartar army, exhibiting extreme heroism, inhuman strength, and endurance. The story about Evpaty Kolovrat's bravery and his joust with Tatar warrior Khostovrul add an epic flair bringing to the story stylistic features found in Russian byliny. Eventually Evpaty is killed. Batu is amazed at the bravery of Evpaty's warriors and honors his dead body, releasing Riazan prisoners with the body without harm. The part of the tale is told in ornate yet vigorous style using phraseology of Rus' military tales. Prince Ingvar Ingvarevich (nephew of Prince Yuri) returns from Chernigov having been visiting his relatives, at the time of the destruction of Riazan. Having found his fatherland devastated, he searches through the bodies to find all of his relatives dead. He falls to the ground and utters a lament. Having commemorated the dead he rebuilds the city and restores the land of Riazan. The story ends with him taking the throne of Riazan. The respect shown by Batu for his enemies fits with a medieval tradition of mutual understanding among military men, and indicates that some medieval writers thought that Tatars were capable of exhibiting chivalric courtesy as the native inhabitants knew it.

== Issues with dating and sources ==
Some inaccuracy present in the tale (such as the naming) help to date to a later period, after the actual events took place. The naming inaccuracy suggests some of possible sources that might have been used in composition of the Tale. Most likely, the names of the Princes were taken from court archives where lists of Ryazan's dead princes were kept; the author could look at tombstones of most of the Princes. Furthermore, the chronicle of Ryazan that survived in Novgorod’s copy does not mention any names but still gives details about the invasions that were faithfully repeated in the Tale. Other suggested sources are local legends (already mentioned) and the folk tradition of byliny. The episode about Evpaty the Fearless in particular has a number of folkloric characteristics like use of hyperbole (the hero seemed endowed with supernatural strength able to fight hundreds of Batu’s warriors by himself. Only catapults could take him down.) The motif of single combat between two heroes from opposing armies is also a traditional one. Typical of folktales Evpaty’s druzhina speaks in riddles. The military tale abounds with song-like formulas and motifs like the frequent characterization of Ryazan warriors as adept and swift: “все воинство, и удалцы и резвецы, узорочие резанское” the “chalice of death” shared by all of Ryazan's defenders. Prince Igor's lament is another typical element (both in written and oral sources). The ending of the Tale gives some further hints about the date of its creation: Prince Igor returns to restore the city, and peace descends on the region. As Likhachev points out, Ryazan was ravaged but not destroyed. From later historical accounts, we know that Ryazan was destroyed in the 1570s. This fact secures the composition time to the first half of the fourteenth century. Furthermore, details from the Tale were later repeated in 1418 text about the destruction of Moscow by Tokhtamysh. These details were not present in the earlier version from 1409. Likhachev suggests that Moscow text exhibits direct textual parallels with the Ryazan Tale.

== Cited sources ==
- Likhachev, D. S., ed. (1987). "Великое наследие". Избранные работы в трех томах. Vol. 2. Leningrad.: Khudozh. Lit. pp. 244–263.
- Halperin, Charles J. (1987). Russia and the Golden Horde: The Mongol Impact on Medieval Russian History. p. 222. ISBN 9781850430575.
