= The Crazy Empress =

2025 Russian fantasy comedy film

- Шальная императрица
- Directed by: Radda Novikova
- Written by: Andrey Taratukhin; Elena Verner
- Produced by: Nikolay Artemev; Konstantin Polikarpov; Igor Strelnikov; Telman Akavov; Nikita Vladimirov; Maxim Rogalsky; Vasily Rovensky; Olga Galuzinskaya; Oleg Litvinov; Sergey Mikhaylov; Alla Nykvist; Elena Kovaleva; Nikolay Kostomarov
- Starring: Irina Pegova; Angelina Strechina; Zoya Berber; Alisa Stasyuk; Kirill Zaytsev; Fyodor Gamaleya
- Cinematography: Andrey Danelyan
- Edited by: Svetlana Maklakova
- Music by: Kazi; Vladimir Sudakov
- Production companies: Ministry of Culture; St. Petersburg Committee for Culture; Nikita Vladimirov's Film Company; Trust Real Estate; Olymp Group; A Steel Company
- Distributed by: Nashe Kino (Our Cinema)
- Release date: December 4, 2025 (Russia)
- Running time: 95 minutes
- Country: Russia
- Language: Russian
- Budget: ₽90 million
- Box office: ₽36 million

The Crazy Empress (Russian: Шальная императрица, romanized: Shalnaya imperatritsa) is a 2025 Russian adventure comedy film directed by Radda Novikova in her feature film directorial debut. The film stars Irina Pegova as Catherine the Great, who is accidentally transported to modern-day Saint Petersburg. The three friends were portrayed by Angelina Strechina, Zoya Berber, and Alisa Stasyuk. The cast also included Kirill Zaytsev and Fyodor Gamaleya.

The Crazy Empress was theatrically released in Russia on December 4, 2025, by "Our Cinema" Film Distribution.

== Plot ==
In modern Saint Petersburg, three close friends—Lera, Valya, and Olya—perform a mystical ritual as a joke. To their astonishment, the ritual works, and Catherine the Great (Irina Pegova) materializes in their apartment.

The Empress quickly adapts to the 21st century, enjoying modern luxuries, nightlife, and technology. However, her presence creates a temporal paradox that threatens to alter history. The three friends must find a way to return the Empress to the 18th century before the changes become permanent, while Catherine herself grows increasingly fond of modern life.

== Cast ==
- Irina Pegova as Catherine the Great
- Angelina Strechina as Olya
- Zoya Berber as Lera
- Alisa Stasyuk as Valya
- Kirill Zaytsev as Sokolov
- Fyodor Gamaleya as Potemkin
- Ilya Koletsky as Petya
- Elizaveta Gureeva as Stasya
- Timofey Alekseev as Grisha, a boy
- Gleb Belogortsev as Gosha, a boy

=== Rest of cast listed alphabetically ===
- pr. Nikolay Artemev as a parent
- Alexey Voskresensky as Vadim Valerevich, a foreman
- Sergey Slesarenko as Peter the Great
- Olga Nikolskaya as the fake Catherine the Great
- Ilya Staroselsky as a homeless person
- Sergey Blednykh as Lera's boss
- Pavel Bratkovsky as a bartender
- Nadezhda Pigina as the Empress's neighbor
- Peter Nebenhaus as a school principal
- Artur Panov as a museum security guard
- Andrey Nikulin as a worker

== Production ==
The film marks the transition of director Radda Novikova from television (known for Interns and Girls with Makarov) to full-length feature films. Principal photography took place on location in Saint Petersburg, utilizing both historic imperial palaces and modern urban settings.

== Release and reception ==
The film was released in theaters across Russia on December 4, 2025. The film received generally positive reviews, with critics praising its humor and Pegova's acting.

== See also ==
- Ivan Vasilievich: Back to the Future (1973)
- Kate & Leopold (2001)
