= 60 Seconds of Solitude in Year Zero =

- Film poster
- Release date: 2011
- Running time: 60 minutes

60 Seconds of Solitude in Year Zero is a 2011 anthology film, shown for a one-time-only event that took place in the Port of Tallinn, Estonia on 22 December 2011. The film is a collection of roughly one-minute-long short films created by 51 filmmakers from around the world on the theme of the death of cinema. At the end of the film's only screening, the projector was set on fire and the filmstrip was destroyed.

The project, developed as an ode to 35mm film and dedicated to preserving the freedom of thought in cinema, was conceived by Veiko Õunpuu with Taavi Eelmaa and funded by the 2011 European Capital of Culture Tallinn, the Estonian Ministry of Culture and the EU-Japan Fest Committee. Composer Ülo Krigul provided the music for the film, performed live during the screening with Mart Taniel, Lauri-Dag Tuur, and Maria Juur.

== Content ==
Order	Director/s	Country	Description
1	Ken Jacobs	USA	Children play in a sandpit, amongst a series of rapid black and white flashes.
2	Shinji Aoyama	Japan	A coastal power station.
3	Woo Ming Jin	Malaysia	A poor, tired young woman walks the streets with a baby, as she sees a wealthier woman holding her own child.
4	Jussi Reittu	Finland	A man emotionlessly drags on a cigarette.
5	Phie Ambo	Denmark	An older couple meticulously bury animal horns in the dirt.
6	Norbert Shieh	USA	A smartly dressed man abandons his car and approaches a large abandoned building.
7	Mark Cousins	Ireland	The director places flowers at the graves of cinemas greatest icons.
8	Marina Manushenko	Switzerland	The reflections on various wet surfaces, in a city landscape.
9	Kim Jee-woon	South Korea	In excerpts from the director's 2005 film A Bittersweet Life, the protagonist's corpse, and a scene of him happily shadowboxing is shown.
10	Mart Taniel	Estonia	A man incessantly prays by a riverside, and is largely ignored by those around him.
11	Tom Tykwer	Germany	In an excerpt from the director's 2010 film Three, a couple cautiously walk through an art gallery, as though they are being followed.
12	Mika Taanila	Finland	Modern infrastructure amongst natural landscapes.
13	Simon Rumley	UK	The director shows us the cinema he visited frequently growing up, now closed, and ready for demolition.
14	Ari Alexander Ergis Magnússon	Iceland	An older man returns home from a funeral, and stands by the ocean (seemingly committing suicide).
15	Ronni Shendar	Israel	Various shots of flowing water.
16	Edmund Yeo	Malaysia/Japan	A split-screen depicting a young photographer as she wanders a snowy landscape, and a sorrowful woman contemplating throwing herself off of a bridge.
17	Brian Yuzna	USA	Physical comedian Peter Pitofsky mimes turning into the Incredible Hulk.
18	Pen-ek Ratanaruang	Thailand	Thousands of paper cubes float through a massive tank of water.
19	Mark Boswell	USA	The journey of water flowing from a water tower marked "Save the Palestinians".
20	Bruce McClure	USA	Projection grain and film flicker.
21	Gustav Deutsch	Austria	A single pair of clasped hands in front of a moving mass of water.
22	Jeon Kyu-hwan	South Korea	A young man looks to a photograph of a married couple, and commits suicide.
23	Michael Glawogger	Austria	The cameraman travels through the streets of an Indian marketplace, as the locals stare, intrigued.
24	Kang Kiyoung (credited as Dalpalan)	South Korea	Overlapped footage of four different people walking down a street at night, singing to themselves.
25	Brian Yuzna	USA	A fancy gentleman remote-controls a pink-haired robot woman, and kisses her (bringing her to life). Now free, she slaps him and leaves.
26	Jes Benstock	UK	Perspective of the day in the life of an infant.
27	Gereon Wetzel	Germany	A large group of people form a human tower. When it inevitably falls, they catch one another and cheer wildly.
28	Albert Serra	Spain	A couple lay by a riverbed in a forest at night.
29	Tolga Karaçelik	Turkey	The director writes an apology letter to cinema itself, apologizing for his poor contribution to the film, due to his running out of time to make something substantial. He instead films various strangers clapping a clapperboard for the camera.
30	Ville Kerimaa	Finland	The remains of a ruined brick building.
31	Jan Ijäs	Finland	Three people sit silently on their smartphones in a beautiful garden.
32	Hafsteinn Gunnar Sigurðsson	Iceland	A woman approaches the edge of a steaming hot spring.
33	Vimukthi Jayasundara	Sri Lanka	A lone swinging lightbulb.
34	Adam Wingard	USA	A couple film their sexual exploits together, and seemingly regret it.
35	Viktor Kaganovich	Ukraine	A lace curtain and leaves blow gently in the breeze.
36	Park Chan-wook	South Korea	A man wanders a hallway with a lighter and is startled by a young girl spraying flames from an aerosol can. He awakens to find a gagged woman tied to a piano like a marionette. This segment is partially excerpted from "Cut", Park's short film from Three... Extremes.
37	Eric Khoo	Singapore	A violent young woman repeatedly slams her hand into a chest of drawers. She is then seen attacking a man, and dismembering him whilst he is tied to a chair.
38	Maxì Dejoie	Italy	A naked man stands on a beach and shoots a flaming arrow through a desktop computer, which bursts into flames.
39	Andres Tenusaar	Estonia	Lamps are pulled across a field by rolling eggs. A woman places two of the eggs in a pan, where they self-combust. She then places both in her mouth before immediately depositing them from under her dress, as the lamps roll away.
40	Auraeus Solito	Philippines	Two indigenous men shoot at monkeys with blow-darts.
41	Rafi Pitts	Iran	Men set fire to a field and watch it burn.
42	Malcolm Le Grice	UK	The director burns sugar on a spoon, mixes it into a glass of water and drinks it.
43	Veiko Õunpuu	Estonia	A large man devours a slab of meat before choking to death.
44	Brillante Mendoza	Philippines	Hundreds of birds soar through the sky.
45	Moon Kyungwon	South Korea	Ivy begins to grow over a greenhouse full of taxidermy animals, until it eventual disappears, and so do the animals.
46	Feyyaz	Germany	A demonic-looking woman spits blood and staggers through a forest. She sees a beautiful version of herself sat relaxing by the water.
47	Aku Louhimies	Finland	A young girl sits intently writing in a workbook.
48	Ishii Gakuryu	Japan	Warped and distorted images of a dark forest gradually turn bright and beautiful.
49	Naomi Kawase	Japan	A young girl admires a beautiful sunset through a car window. As the words "I love you" appear on-screen, she slowly turns to acknowledge the camera.
50	Amir Naderi	Iran	A person traces their hand across the surfaces of the contents of a film-themed antique store.
51	Jussi Jaakola	Finland	A cloud of smoke.

== Directors ==
- Phie Ambo (Denmark)
- Shinji Aoyama (Japan)
- Jes Benstock (UK)
- Mark Boswell (USA)
- Mark Cousins (Ireland)
- Dalpalan (South Korea)
- Maxì Dejoie (Italy)
- Gustav Deutsch (Austria)
- Feyyaz (Germany)
- Michael Glawogger (Austria)
- Jorge Michel Grau (Mexico)
- Malcolm Le Grice (UK)
- Jan Ijäs (Finland)
- Ishii Gakuryu (Japan)
- Jeon Kyu-hwan (South Korea)
- Jussi Jaakola (Finland)
- Ken Jacobs (USA)
- Vimukthi Jayasundara (Sri Lanka)
- Woo Ming Jin (Malaysia)
- Viktor Kaganovich (Ukraine)
- Tolga Karaçelik (Turkey)
- Naomi Kawase (Japan)
- Ville Kerimaa (Finland)
- Eric Khoo (Singapore)
- Kim Jee-woon (South Korea)
- Aku Louhimies (Finland)
- Ari Alexander Ergis Magnússon (Iceland)
- Marina Manushenko (Switzerland)
- Bruce McClure (USA)
- Brillante Mendoza (Philippines)
- Moon Kyungwon (South Korea)
- Amir Naderi (Iran)
- Veiko Õunpuu (Estonia)
- Park Chan-wook (South Korea)
- Rafi Pitts (Iran)
- Pen-ek Ratanaruang (Thailand)
- Jussi Reittu (Finland)
- Simon Rumley (UK)
- Albert Serra (Spain)
- Ronni Shendar (Israel)
- Norbert Shieh (USA)
- Hafsteinn Gunnar Sigurðsson (Iceland)
- Auraeus Solito (Philippines)
- Mika Taanila (Finland)
- Mart Taniel (Estonia)
- Andres Tenusaar (Estonia)
- Tom Tykwer (Germany)
- Gereon Wetzel (Germany)
- Adam Wingard (USA)
- Edmund Yeo (Malaysia/Japan)
- Brian Yuzna (USA) (2 segments)

Directors listed in the initial trailer but not included in the final film:

- Bradley Eros (USA)
- Fridrik Thor Fridriksson (Iceland)
- Manuela Kaufmann (Italy)
- Aki Kaurismäki (Finland)
- Ilppo Pohjola (Finland)
- Gillian Wearing (UK)
- Oliver Whitehead (Finland)
- Kari Yli-Annala (Finland)
