= Olesya Sudzilovskaya =

Soviet and Russian actress (born 1974)

- Sudzilovskaya at a creative evening at the S. M. Kirov Military Medical Academy, 2023
- Born: Olesya Ilyinichna Sudzilovskaya; May 20, 1974; Zelenograd, Moscow, Russian SFSR, Soviet Union
- Occupations: Actress, television presenter
- Years active: 1990–present
- Awards: Honored Artist of the Russian Federation (2024)

Olesya Ilyinichna Sudzilovskaya (Russian: Олеся Ильинична Судзиловская; born 20 May 1974) is a Soviet and Russian stage and film actress and television presenter. In 2024, she was awarded the title of Honored Artist of the Russian Federation.

== Early life and education ==
Sudzilovskaya was born on 20 May 1974 in Zelenograd. She practiced rhythmic gymnastics as a child.

At the age of 14, she was invited to audition for the film The Mediator (1990), directed by Vladimir Potapov, in which she later played the leading role.

She graduated from the Moscow Art Theatre School in 1997 (studio of Avangard Leontyev). The same year, she joined the Mayakovsky Theatre in Moscow.

== Career ==
Sudzilovskaya gained widespread popularity in the late 1990s and early 2000s through roles in films such as Mama Don't Cry (1997), Silver Lily of the Valley (2000), and Garbage Man (2001).

In 2013, the film Intimate Parts, directed by Alexey Chupov and Natalya Merkulova, premiered in the competition program of Kinotavr. In 2018, she starred in the acclaimed television series House Arrest, which received multiple awards.

In 2021, she played the lead role in the TNT television series Girls with Makarov, portraying the head of a criminal investigation department.

In January 2022, the romantic comedy Swingers, co-starring Dmitry Nagiyev, was released in Russian cinemas.

As of 2025, Sudzilovskaya has appeared in more than 80 film and television productions.

== Personal life ==
On 4 January 2009, Sudzilovskaya gave birth to her first son, Artyom. Later that year, on 26 October 2009, she married businessman Sergey Dzeban, the child's father.

Her second son, Mike, was born on 19 January 2016.

== Selected filmography ==
- The Mediator (1990)
- Mama Don't Cry (1997)
- Silver Lily of the Valley (2000)
- Give Me Moonlight (2001)
- Garbage Man (2001)
- Bandit Petersburg (TV series, 2003)
- Waiting for a Miracle (2007)
- You and I (2008)
- Stone (2012)
- Intimate Parts (2013)
- House with Lilies (2014)
- Orlova and Alexandrov (2015)
- Yana+Yanko (2017)
- House Arrest (TV series, 2020)
- Wild League (2019)
- Girls with Makarov (TV series, 2021–2022)
- Swingers (2022)

== Television work ==
- Family News / Personal News Service (Russia-1, TNT)
- Subbotnik (Russia-1)

== Awards ==
- Angel Kiss Awards, Moscow International Film Festival (2010)
- Figaro National Acting Award (2022)
- Honored Artist of the Russian Federation (5 February 2024)
