= The Man Who Surprised Everyone =

2018 Russian film directed by Aleksey Chupov and Natasha Merkulova

- Film poster
- Directed by: Alexey Chupov; Natasha Merkulova
- Written by: Aleksey Chupov; Natasha Merkulova
- Produced by: Ekaterina Filippova; Alexander Rodnyansky; Katrin Kissa; Guillaume de Seille
- Starring: Yevgeny Tsyganov; Natalya Kudryashova; Yury Kuznetsov
- Cinematography: Mart Taniel
- Edited by: Vadim Krasnitsky
- Production companies: Pan-Atlantic Studio; Arizona Productions; Homeless Bob Production; Non-Stop Production
- Distributed by: PROvzglyad
- Release date: 4 September 2018 (VFF)
- Running time: 104 minutes
- Country: Russia
- Language: Russian

The Man Who Surprised Everyone (Russian: Человек, который удивил всех, romanized: Chelovek, kotoryj udivil vsekh) is a Russian film-drama directed by Aleksey Chupov and Natasha Merkulova, shot according to their own script in 2018. Member for the Horizons (Orizzonti) section (Best Actress Award) of the 75th Venice International Film Festival. It was selected as the Russia entry for the Best Foreign Language Film at the 76th Golden Globe Awards.

== Plot ==
Siberian huntsman Yegor is an exemplary family man and a man respected in his village. He and his wife Natalya are waiting for their second child. Suddenly, Yegor learns that he is incurably sick, and that he has only two months left to live. Neither traditional medicine nor shamanic sorcery help the fight against the disease, and in the end Yegor decides to take a desperate step by trying to completely change his personality in order to deceive approaching death, as did the legendary drake Zhamba, the hero of the ancient Siberian epos.

== Cast ==
- Yevgeny Tsyganov as Yegor Korshunov
- Natalya Kudryashova as Natalya, Yegor's wife
- Yury Kuznetsov as grandfather Nikolay
- Pavel Maykov as Zakhar
- Maksim Vitorgan as Professor
- Igor Savochkin as Fyodor
- Polina Raikina as Marina
- Vasily Popov as Artyom
- Amadu Mamadakov as Doctor

== Reception ==
=== Critical response ===
- Deborah Young in The Hollywood Reporter: While Kudryashova brings a wide range of emotions to flesh out the character of the wife, Tsyganov is quietly magnificent in the main role. Both go far beyond fairy tale stereotypes, even while their acting follows timeworn paths that seem inexorable. The tech work is sheer simplicity, following the spirit of Egor's quest in the most naturalistic way possible, without trying to prettify the mud-washed village and weather-beaten shacks. Vadim Krasnitsky's editing keeps the story-telling smooth and fluid.
- Anton Dolin in Meduza: This motion picture is finely balanced, its seemingly outrageous frame is held due to a deep study and understanding by the creators of the film of the mechanics of the female and male archetype in the Russian consciousness.
