= Captain Volkonogov Escaped =

2021 film

- Theatrical release poster
- Russian: Капитан Волконогов бежал
- Directed by: Natalya Merkulova; Alexey Chupov
- Written by: Natalya Merkulova; Alexey Chupov; Mart Taniel
- Produced by: Valery Fedorovich; Yevgeny Nikishov; Aleksandr Plotnikov; Catherine Kissa; Charles-Evrard Chekhov; Nadezhda Zayonchkovskaya; Nadezhda Zhukova
- Starring: Yura Borisov; Timofey Tribuntsev; Aleksandr Yatsenko; Nikita Kukushkin; Vladimir Epifantsev; Anastasiya Ukolova; Natalya Kudriashova
- Cinematography: Mart Taniel
- Edited by: Francois Gedigier; Mukharam Kabulova
- Music by: Elena Stroganova
- Production companies: Look-Film (Russia); Place of Power (Russia); Ministry of Culture (Russia); Kinoprime Foundation (Russia); Homeless Bob Production (Estonia); KinoVista (France); Eurimages (France); L'Aide aux Cinémas du Monde (France)
- Distributed by: Central Partnership
- Release dates: 8 September 2021 (Venice); 2022 (Russia)
- Running time: 126 minutes
- Countries: Russia; Estonia; France
- Language: Russian

Captain Volkonogov Escaped (Russian: Капитан Волконогов бежал, romanized: Kapitan Volkonogov bezhal) is a 2021 thriller drama film written and directed by Natalya Merkulova and Alexey Chupov. The main roles were played by Yura Borisov as Captain Fyodor Volkonogov. It was selected to compete for the Golden Lion at the 78th Venice International Film Festival.

== Plot ==
In the USSR during the Great Terror, Captain Fyodor Volkonogov serves in the Soviet law enforcement agency. He is trusted by his superiors and his colleagues respect him. He witnesses the suicide of his immediate superior, Major Gvozdev, who throws himself out of his own office window under the threat of imminent arrest. Under the pretext of a call for evaluation, arrests begin of employees of the department headed by Gvozdev. The Captain escapes arrest. A messenger from the world above appears to the Captain, who is told he is destined for hell unless he can find a victim of one of his crimes who forgives him.

== Cast ==
- Yura Borisov as Captain Volkonogov
- Timofey Tribuntsev as Major Golovnya
- Aleksandr Yatsenko as Major Gvozdyov
- Nikita Kukushkin as Veretennikov
- Vladimir Epifantsev as Colonel Zhikharev
- Anastasiya Ukolova as Raisa
- Natalya Kudriashova as Elizarova
- Dmitry Podnozov as Professor Elizarov
- Viktoriya Tolstoganova as the widow Steiner
- Yury Kuznetsov as Ignatiy Alekseyevich
- Igor Savochkin as Uncle Misha
- Maxim Stoyanov as the worker Lependyin
- Vitaliya Korniyenko as the Girl
- Marina Mustetsova as the Girl on the tram

This film was Igor Savochkin's final role before his death.

== Production ==
The film received support from the Ministry of Culture of the Russian Federation, the Kinoprime Foundation for the Development of Contemporary Cinematography, the European Fund for Supporting Co-production and Distribution of Cinematographic and Audiovisual Works Eurimages, the Estonian Ministry of Culture and the Estonian Film Foundation.

Production was carried out by the film companies Place of Power and Look-Film (Russia), Homeless Bob Production (Estonia), KinoVista (France). The producers were Valery Fedorovich, Yevgeny Nikishov, Aleksandr Plotnikov, co-producers Catherine Kissa, Charles-Evrard Chekhov and Nadezhda Zayonchkovskaya.

The film's soundtrack features the Soviet Russian song Polyushko-pole, which can be heard in several instances throughout the film. It is performed and danced to by a choir of NKVD members and sung by the character Veretennikov as he is tortured.

=== Production design ===
The film featured anachronistic, non-period clothing, including modern sports tracksuits.

== Release ==
The first screening of the film took place on September 8, 2021 at the 78th Venice Film Festival.

The film received the Audience Choice Award at the 32nd Kinotavr Open Film Festival (2021), the work entered the main competition and won in the Best Screenplay nomination. The film won the bronze medal in the main competition at the El Gouna Festival, Egypt, and also won the Best Feature Film award at the XXX Philadelphia International Film Festival, becoming the first Russian film in history to be awarded this prize.

Captain Volkonogov Escaped was supposed to theatrically release in the Russian Federation by Central Partnership on April 7, 2022, but was postponed to autumn and then subsequently shelved.

== Reception ==
=== Accolades ===
- Within the framework of the Spanish International Film Festival in Gijón, Natalya Merkulova was awarded the prize as Best Female Director.
- 2021 Golden Unicorn Awards: Best Film, Best Screenplay and Best Actor (Yura Borisov)
- White Elephant Awards of the Russian Guild of Film Critics and Critics in the Best Film nominations, Best Lead Actor (Yura Borisov) and Best Supporting Actress (Natalya Kudriashova).
- Selected to compete for the Golden Lion at the 78th Venice International Film Festival.

=== Critical response ===
Captain Volkonogov Escaped has an approval rating of 100% on review aggregator website Rotten Tomatoes, based on 12 reviews, and an average rating of 8.2/10. Metacritic assigned the film a weighted average score of 82 out of 100, based on 5 critics, indicating "universal acclaim"

The Guardian writer Xan Brooks believes, "Chupov and Merkulova's handling of the material is almost playful, choosing to frame Stalin's Russia as nightmarish deadpan comedy."

Vasily Stepanov, chief editor of Seans, said of the film: "According to the plot, Volkonogov is a kind of parable: a dead comrade appears to the fleeing hero, who promises him an obligatory place in hell if the captain does not beg forgiveness from at least one victim. The scene of the appearance of the infernal messenger from the common grave is made festively, as in Masodov's prose. But with apologies, and even more so with repentance, Volkonogov is tight."

In June 2025 for The New York Times, Mikey Madison, who starred alongside Borisov in Anora (2024), chose Captain Volkonogov Escaped as one of her top 10 films of the 21st century.
