= Mark Boswell =

Mark Boswell may refer to:

- Mark Boswell (athlete), (born 1977), Canadian high jumper
- Mark Boswell (film director) (born 1960), American filmmaker
