= Yana+Yanko =

Yana + Yanko
- Directed by: Natalya Merkulova
- Written by: Ekaterina Mavromatis; Aleksey Chupov; Natalya Merkulova
- Produced by: Anna Melikyan; Oleg Kirichenko
- Starring: Olesya Sudzilovskaya; Danil Zinatullin; Maksim Vitorgan; Artur Smolyaninov
- Cinematography: Oleg Kirichenko
- Music by: Artur Shvarts
- Production company: Magnum
- Release date: April 13, 2017 (Russia)
- Running time: 93 minutes
- Country: Russia
- Language: Russian
- Budget: 150 million rubles
- Box office: 1.6 million rubles

Yana + Yanko (Russian: Яна+Янко) is a 2017 Russian family comedy film directed by Natalya Merkulova. It was released in Russia on 13 April 2017.

== Plot ==
Yana Titova (Olesya Sudzilovskaya) is a successful Moscow businesswoman who runs a fashion magazine. Her life revolves around work and casual relationships, including an affair with a married man, which suits her perfectly.

Unexpectedly, Yana’s estranged father dies. She learns that he had adopted a young Roma orphan named Yanko (Danil Zinatullin). When the media discover this, Yana is forced to take care of the boy to protect her business reputation and to help secure a "Woman of the Year" award.

Yanko turns out to be mischievous and uncontrollable, and Yana’s carefully ordered life begins to fall apart.

== Cast ==
- Olesya Sudzilovskaya as Yana
- Danil Zinatullin as Yanko
- Maksim Vitorgan as Igor
- Artur Smolyaninov as Timofey
- Vladimir Mishukov as Seva
- Alexander Revva as Zhenya
- Tinatin Dalakishvili as Zlata
- Elena Valyushkina as Orphanage director

== Reception ==
Aisylu Kadyrova of Evening Kazan described the film as a warm-hearted movie that “can be safely watched with a loved one, with a grandmother, or with children.”

Film.ru critic Boris Ivanov felt that the film was less successful than Hollywood films on similar themes and lacked emotional depth. He noted that its main strengths were its “proper moral about the value of family” and Danil Zinatullin’s charming performance as Yanko.

== Soundtrack ==
No.	Title	Performer	Length
1.	"Shepotom"	ARTEMIEV
2.	"Kostyor davno pogas"	Music by Arkady Severny
3.	"Rasstoyanie"	Kaspii
4.	"Navsegda"	Yolka
5.	"Tyomnye allei"	DJ Smash & My Michelle
6.	"Ulybaysya"	IOWA
