= Gyeongwon =

Gyeongwon, Kyongwon, or Kyungwon (Korean: 경원; also written with hyphens) may refer to:

- Kyung-won (name), Korean given name
- Kyongwon County, North Hamgyong Province, North Korea
- Gyeongwon Line, railway line between Seoul, South Korea and Wonsan, North Korea
- Gyeongwon, a former name of Incheon, South Korea
