= Mister Knockout =

- Directed by: Artyom Mikhalkov (ru)
- Written by: Vladimir Presnyakov (ru); Oleg Presnyakov (ru)
- Produced by: Aleksey Karpushin; Ekaterina Zhukova
- Starring: Viktor Khorinyak; Sergey Bezrukov; Angelina Strechina; Inga Strelkova-Oboldina; Evgeniya Dmitrieva; Igor Savochkin
- Cinematography: Yury Nikogosov
- Music by: Ivan Burlyaev; Dmitry Noskov; Konstantin Kupriyanov
- Production companies: Russia-1; Rostec; Ministry of Culture; KinoDom company (CinemaHouse company)
- Distributed by: Walt Disney Studios
- Release date: February 23, 2022
- Running time: 113 minutes
- Country: Russia
- Language: Russian
- Budget: ₽200 million

Mister Knockout (Russian: Мистер Нокаут, romanized: Mister Nokaut) is a 2022 Russian biographical film in the sports drama genre, which tells about the life and career of the famous Soviet boxer, 1964 Olympic champion Valeri Popenchenko. The film was directed by Artyom Mikhalkov, the main roles were played by Viktor Khorinyak as a boxer, and Sergey Bezrukov plays the role of his coach.

It is scheduled to be theatrically released on February 23, 2022, by Walt Disney Studios.

== Plot ==
A film about the life and adventures of the legendary Soviet boxer Valeri Popenchenko, the champion of the USSR, Europe and the winner of the 1964 Olympic Games in Tokyo - about his childhood at the Suvorov School in Tashkent, about serving as a border guard cadet, about his first successes and failures, and about his friendship with the coach of the sports society "Dynamo" Grigory Kusikyants. The story is that in any, even the most prestigious fight, the main thing for an athlete is to overcome himself, his fears and weaknesses, and only then it will be possible to win a real victory.

== Cast ==
- Viktor Khorinyak as Valeri Popenchenko
  - Andrey Titchenko as Valeri Popenchenko in childhood
  - Oleg Chugunov as young Valeri Popenchenko in his youth
- Sergey Bezrukov as Grigory Kusikyants
- Angelina Strechina as Tanya
- Inga Strelkova-Oboldina as Evgenia, Tanya's mother
- Evgeniya Dmitrieva as Rufina, Valeri's mother
- Igor Savochkin as Vladimir, Valeri's father
- Vladimir Sterzhakov as Chairman of the USSR Boxing Federation
- Nikita Zverev as Yury Vlasov
- Shirin Abdullaeva as Asmira

== Production ==
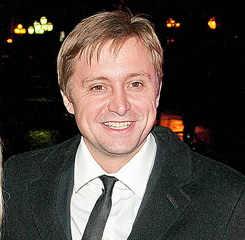
Directed by Artyom Mikhalkov

The Russian cinematographer Nikita Mikhalkov's son Artyom Mikhalkov was a director, the screenwriters were the brothers Vladimir and Oleg Presnyakov, who wrote the script based on real events and the biography of the legendary Soviet boxer.

The film was created with the financial support of the Ministry of Culture of the Russian Federation, the Russian state corporation for assistance in the development, production and export of high-tech industrial products "Rostec" and the sports club "Academy of Boxing".

Principal photography took place in Moscow, Russia, Uzbekistan, Poland and Japan.

== Release ==
Mister Knockout is scheduled to be released in the Russian Federation on February 23, 2022, by Walt Disney Studios.

=== Marketing ===
The first trailer for the film was released on November 23, 2021.
