= Radda Novikova =

Russian film and television director

Radda Vyacheslavovna Novikova (Russian: Радда Вячеславовна Новикова) is a Russian film and television director (born on 25 October 1974). Novikova is well known for directing comedy television series Girls with Makarov, Interns, Two Fathers, Two Sons and feature film The Crazy Empress (2025).

== Life and career ==
Radda Novikova received her directing education in Moscow - in 1994 she graduated from the directing department of the VGIK.

In 2003 she directed the two-part television film Story of the Spring Call.

From 2004 to 2006 she was the director of Inexplicable, yet a Fact (TNT), Out of Law (Channel One), Love Stories (for Channel One), Price of Love, Affair (for TNT).

In 2011 Novikova joined the directing team of the fourth season of medical sitcom Interns. The long-running series starred Ivan Okhlobystin as the cynical chief of staff. She directed the series until the ninth season.

Radda Novikova started working on the sitcom television series Two Fathers, Two Sons starring Dmitry Nagiyev in 2012.

In 2018 she directed comedic police procedural TV series Cop starring Kirill Zaytsev. The series was about an American police officer who comes to Russia to work.

In 2019 Novikova directed the short film Dark like the Night. Karenina-2019 - loosely based on Leo Tolstoy's Anna Karenina. The screenplay was written by Aleksandr Tsypkin. The following year she directed another short film based on a Tsypkin story, Moscow Hill. It starred Anatoliy Beliy, Viktoriya Tolstoganova and Fedor Bondarchuk.

In 2020 Novikova began directing comedy webseries Notes of the Helvetia Hotelier for Okko streaming platform. The series lasted for two seasons.

In 2022 Novikova started directing the second season of Girls with Makarov, a police procedural sitcom starring Pavel Maykov, she directed the whole series until the final fifth season.

In 2025 she directed the feature film The Crazy Empress, a romantic comedy about three friends who accidentally summon Catherine the Great, and as the empress adapts to the 21st century, she inspires them to change their lives and believe in themselves. The film stars Irina Pegova as Catherine the Great, alongside Angelina Strechina, Zoya Berber, and Alisa Stasyuk, with supporting roles by Kirill Zaytsev and Fedor Gamaleya.

== Awards ==
Radda Novikova's Dark like the Night. Karenina-2019 received Best Music Video award at the Prague Independent Film Festival, and also received Best Short Film and Best Supporting Actor (Konstantin Khabensky) awards at the Vienna Independent Film Festival in 2019.

== Filmography ==
=== TV ===
- Story of the Spring Call (TV movie, 2003)
- Girls with Makarov (2022-present)
- Triada (2021)
- Cop (2019)
- Secretary (2018)
- Two Fathers, Two Sons (2013)
- Interns (2011-2013)
- The Xe Men (2011)

=== Webseries ===
- Notes of the Helvetia Hotelier (2020-present)

=== Feature films ===
- The Crazy Empress (2025)

=== Short films ===
- Moscow Hill (2021)
- Dark like the Night. Karenina-2019 (2019)
