= Igor Savochkin =

Russian Actor (1963-2021)

- Born: Igor Yurievich Savochkin; 14 May 1963; Berezovka, Petrovsky District, Saratov Oblast, RSFSR, USSR
- Died: 17 November 2021 (aged 58); Moscow, Russia
- Occupation: Actor
- Years active: 1991–2021
- Spouse: Ekaterina Marakulina

Igor Yurievich Savochkin (Russian: Игорь Юрьевич Савочкин; 14 May 1963 – 17 November 2021) was a Russian theater and film actor, best known for his roles in Russian action and thriller films. Savochkin's acting career has spanned across more than 30 films over the course of three decades.

== Biography ==
Savochkin was born in Berezovka within the Petrovsky District of the former USSR on 14 May 1963. Savochkin graduated with an agricultural degree before attending school at the Saratov Conservatory for acting. Savochkin largely played roles in many Russian drama action and crime films, on occasion working in comedy films as well. Outside film, Savochkin was at one time an announcer for a radio station in Saratov, and has also appeared in several music videos.

Savochkin was married to Ekaterina Marakulina. He died in Moscow on 17 November 2021, at the age of 58 due to liver disease.

== Filmography ==
=== Films ===
Year	Title	Role	Notes
1993	Trotsky	Red commander	
1993	If We'd Only Known	Protopopov	
2004	Night Watch	Maksim Ivanovich	
2005	Day Watch	Maksim Ivanovich	
2006	Junk	Terminator	
2007	The Mermaid	Episode	
2007	Kuka	Uncle Tolya	
2007	The Irony of Fate 2	Kolya	
2008	The Admiral	Lieutenant General Sergey Voytsekhovsky	
2009	Puppy	Deacon Alexey Ponomaryov	
2009	Black Lightning	Boris	
2010	Love Undercover	Maksim Ivanovich	
2011	A Quiet Outpost	Bobrovskiy	
2011	Only You	Taxi driver	
2011	Five Brides	Andrey	
2011	The Life and Adventures of Mishka Yaponchik	Akula	
2011	Home	Dmitriy	
2013	Marathon	Vova	
2013	The Excursionist	Russian Deportee Vityok	
2013	Yolki 3	Alexey Kolesnikov	
2014	Leviathan	Investigator	
2015	The Method	Vyacheslav	
2016	The Code of Cain	Colonel Belousov	
2016	Red Dog	Kuznetsov	
2017	Furious	Ratmir	
2017	Angel of Death	Samoylov	
2018	House Arrest	Mikhail	
2018	Papers, Please: The Short Film	Inspector	
2018	The Man Who Surprised Everyone	Fyodor	
2019	Anna	Alex's partner	
2019	The Bull	Moisey	
2020	Three	Oleg Snegirev	
2021	Ivan Denisovich	Overseer Tatarin	
2021	Captain Volkonogov Escaped	Uncle Misha	
2021	The Execution	Artur Khomraev	
2022	Mister Knockout	Vladimir Popenchenko, Valeri's father	
2022	Behind Closed Doors	Neighbor	

=== TV Series ===
Year	Title	Role	Notes
2000	Our 90's	Cameo	
2005	Kulagin and Partners	Episode	
2006	The Gromovs	Tolyan	
2007	The Saboteur 2	Investigator	
2008	Wide River	Vasili Grabov	
2011	Alibi for Two	Savochkin	
2011	Gold Stock	Petrovich	
2013	Night Swallows	Lieutenant	
2013	Scream of the Owl	Voron	
2014	Migratory Вirds	Sergey Tarasov	
2014	Anna	Ivan Antonov	
2015	The Method	Slavik	(Episode: Summer Resident)
2019	To the Lake	Bobyl	
2020	Call-center	Boater	

=== Music videos ===
- I'm Not a Sorceress – Nadezhda Kadysheva
- Heat – Yulia Chicherina
- Girl in the City – Vyacheslav Butusov
