= Intimate Parts =

- Интимные места
- Directed by: Natalya Merkulova; Alexey Chupov
- Written by: Natalya Merkoulova; Alexey Chupov
- Produced by: Bakur Bakuradze; Yulia Mishkinene; Alexander Plotnikov; Zaur Bolotaev
- Starring: Yuri Kolokolnikov; Yuliya Aug; Olesya Sudzilovskaya
- Cinematography: Mart Taniel
- Edited by: Rufat Hasanov
- Music by: Alexey Zelensky
- Production company: Vita Aktiva
- Release date: 2013
- Running time: 76 minutes
- Country: Russia
- Language: Russian
- Budget: US$1 million

Intimate Parts (Russian: Интимные места) is a 2013 Russian erotic drama film directed by debut filmmakers Natalya Merkulova and Alexey Chupov.

The film was screened in the main competition of the 24th Open Russian Film Festival Kinotavr and received several awards, including the prize for Best Debut. Festival program director Sitora Alieva noted the boldness and audacity of the young directors in attempting to create genuinely provocative cinema. The film explores the lives of big-city residents who interpret personal freedom and relationships with the opposite sex in very different ways.

== Plot ==
The film presents the stories of several people living in contemporary Moscow who suffer from emotional inhibition and sexual dissatisfaction. The characters’ lives—those of a fashionable photographer who photographs genitals, a childless married couple fascinated by a young circus performer, an employee of a morality committee discussing legislation banning erotic content while censoring classic films yet constantly thinking about sex, a psychoanalyst, and several others—rarely intersect.

Some characters seek help from a psychoanalyst, while others attempt to resolve their issues on their own.

== Cast ==
- Yuri Kolokolnikov as Ivan
- Yuliya Aug as Lyudmila Petrovna
- Olesya Sudzilovskaya as Svetlana
- Ekaterina Shcheglova as Eva
- Aleksey Chupov as Sergey
- Timur Badalbeyli as Boris, the psychotherapist
- Nikita Tarasov as Alexey
- Dinara Yankovskaya as Sayana
- Pavel Artemyev as The Magician
- Ksenia Katalymova as Olga
- Pavel Yulku as Lyudmila Petrovna’s driver

== Awards and nominations ==
=== 2013 ===
- 24th Open Russian Film Festival Kinotavr (Sochi)
  - Best Debut – Natalya Merkoulova, Aleksey Chupov
  - Best Actress – Yuliya Aug
  - Diploma of the Guild of Film Critics and Film Scholars of Russia
- 17th Tallinn International Film Festival “Dark Nights”
  - Special Jury Prize for Most Original Screenplay
- White Elephant Award
  - Best Supporting Actress – Yuliya Aug

=== 2014 ===
- Nika Awards nominations
  - Best Actress – Yuliya Aug
  - Best Supporting Actress – Olesya Sudzilovskaya
  - Discovery of the Year – Natalya Merkoulova, Aleksey Chupov
