= Inga Strelkova-Oboldina =

Russian theatre and film actress (born 1968)

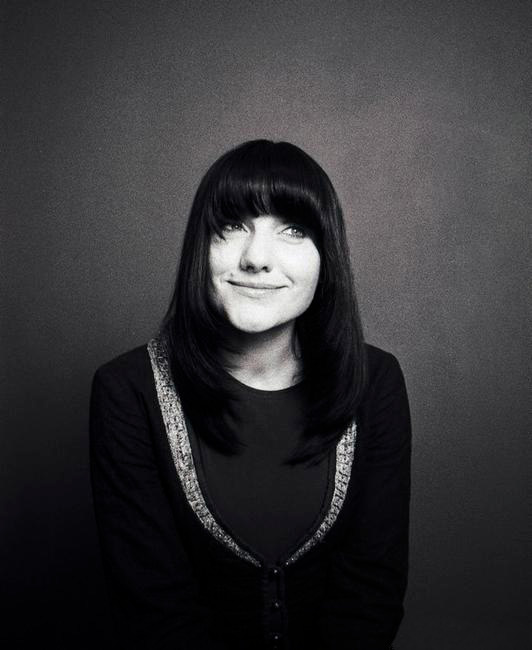
- Inga Strelkova-Oboldina in 2008
- Born: Inga Petrovna Gudimova; 23 December 1968 (age 57); Kyshtym, Chelyabinsk Oblast, RSFSR, USSR
- Occupation: Actress
- Years active: 1996–present

Inga Petrovna Strelkova-Oboldina (Russian: Инга Петровна Стрелкова-Оболдина; born 23 December 1968) is a Russian theatre and film actress.

== Biography ==
Oboldina was born in the small Ural town of Kyshtym, into a family of engineers. After high school, she studied at the faculty of theatrical directing at the Institute of Culture and Art in Chelyabinsk. In the process of studying Inga Petrovna discovered her acting skills and started playing on stage. During the fourth course of study, Inga Oboldina married her classmate Garold Strelkov and took a double surname – Strelkova-Oboldina. After graduating from university with a red diploma, she remained at the institute to teach at the department of scenic speech. Two years later, she and her husband moved to Moscow. In Moscow, Strelkova-Oboldina entered the GITIS – (RATI) (workshop of Pyotr Fomenko). On November 6, 1996, she played in the premiere of Gerold Strelkov's play Sakhalin Wife at the recently opened Strelkov Theatre.

In 1998, Inga Strelkova-Oboldina was offered a role in the TV series Imposters.

On 21 December 2012 she gave birth to a daughter, Clara, from the St. Petersburg actor and director Vitaly Saltykov.

== Filmography ==
=== Theatre ===
- 1996 — Sakhalin Wife (director G. Strelkov)
- 1997 — Cold and Warmly, or Idea, Mr. House (director E. Nevezhina)
- 1998 — Joan of Arc. Childhood (director G. Strelkov)
- 1999 — Dali (director Yu. Grymov)
- 2000 — Joan of Arc. When the yard and in War (director G. Strelkov)
- 2000 — Millionersha (director Vl. Mirzoyev)
- 2001 — Richard III (director G. Strelkov)
- 2002 — Nachitalas! .. based on the script by A. Poyarkov and R. Khrushch (director G. Strelkov)
- 2003 — Fantasies of Ivan Petrovich based on Alexander Pushkin's works (director G. Strelkov)
- 2003 — The Cherry Orchard Anton Chekhov (director E. Nekrošius, K. S. International Foundation and Meno Fortas)
- 2004 — Mata Hari E. Gremina (director G. Strelkov)
- 2005 — All the People as M. Camoletti (director L. Trushkin)
- 2006 — Shooting Down Rain A. Kureychik (director G. Strelkov)

=== Film ===
- 1998 — Imposters (TV series) as Tamara
- 2001 — Sakhalin Wife as Marina
- 2002 — Sky. Plane. Girl as Myshka
- 2003 — The French Guy as Tamara
- 2003 — Spas Under the Birch (TV series) as Natalya
- 2003 — Kill Evening as Tamara
- 2004 — Children of the Arbat (TV series) as Nina Ivanova
- 2004 — On Upper Maslovka Street as Roza
- 2004 — Narrow Bridge (TV series) as hairdresser
- 2005 — Leningrader as Zizi
- 2005 — The Kukotsky Case (TV series) as episode
- 2005 — Doctor Zhivago (TV series) as Shurochka Schlesinger
- 2005 — The Case of "Dead Souls" (TV series) as Marya Antonovna, the daughter of Governor
- 2005 — Giving Sale as Zhanna
- 2006 — It Doesn't Hurt Me as Asya
- 2006 — She-Wolf (TV series) as Lydia Mikhaylovna Sapsay
- 2006 — Ellipsis as Varvara
- 2006 — Golden Calf as Varvara Lokhankina
- 2006 — Demons (TV series) as Maria Timofeevna Lebyadkina
- 2007 — Detective Putilin (TV series) as Varvara Putilina
- 2007 — The Will of Lenin (TV series) as Zoya Vershinina
- 2007 — The Irony of Fate 2 as taxi driver
- 2007 — The Betrothed (TV) as Lera
- 2008 — Native People (TV series) as Sofya
- 2008 — The Long-awaited Love as Larisa
- 2008 — Everybody Dies but Me as Zhanna's mother
- 2011 — Wedding Exchange as Vika
- 2011 — Yolki 2 as Katya
- 2012 — Detective Mom (TV series) as Levina
- 2012 — The Conductor as Alla
- 2013 — Gagarin: First in Space as Adilya Kotovskaya
- 2013 — Balabol (TV series) as Varvara Semyonovna Postysheva, Police Colonel
- 2014 — The New Wife as Lika
- 2015 — Adult Daughter (TV series) as Natalia
- 2015 — The Theory of Improbability as Alvina
- 2017 — Light Up! as Alevtina
- 2019 — Saving Leningrad as Galochka
- 2022 — Mister Knockout as Evgenia, Tanya's mother
- 2023 — Frau as Kristina's mother

== Awards and nominations ==
- Recipient of the festival "Debuts in Moscow": Best Women's role (Sakhalin Wife, 1996)
- Recipient of the First International Festival "The New Drama": Best Women's role (Nachitalas!..., 2001)
- Recipient of the International Stanislavsky Prize: Best Women's role (The Cherry Orchard, 2003)
- Creativity Magazine Award for Creative Actress Year (The Cherry Orchard, 2003)
- Recipient of the festival performances of chamber "Golden Age" (Fantasies of Ivan Petrovich, 2004)
- Triumph Young Award (2004)
- Kinotavr (2017): Best Actress (Light Up!)
