= Light Up! =

- Directed by: Kirill Pletnyov
- Written by: Kirill Pletnyov
- Produced by: Ruben Dishdishyan; Vadim Goryainov; Pavel Odynin; Kirill Pletnyov
- Starring: Viktoriya Isakova; Inga Strelkova-Oboldina; Vladimir Ilyin
- Cinematography: Sergey Mikhalchuk
- Music by: Artyom Mikhayonkin
- Production companies: Mars Media Entertainment; Sputnik
- Distributed by: Nashe Kino
- Release date: December 7, 2017 (Russia)
- Running time: 97 min.
- Country: Russia
- Language: Russian

Light Up! (Russian: Жги!, romanized: Zhgi!) is a 2017 Russian musical drama film directed and written by Kirill Pletnyov. The film took part in the main competitive program of the film festival Kinotavr 2017. The film tells the story of a female supervisor at a women's prison who is given the chance to participate in a major Russian music show, with unexpected help from an inmate who is also a singer.

== Plot ==
A strict warden at a women’s correctional facility in the town of Aprelsk, Alevtina Romanova, nicknamed "Romashka" (played by Inga Oboldina), possesses an extraordinary singing talent. She has been singing since childhood. As a little girl, she even performed on stage at this same facility, accompanied by her grandmother, singing The Old Clock from Alla Pugacheva's repertoire. However, Alevtina is very self-conscious about her talent, and as an adult, she rarely sings, doing so only in private.

On her fortieth birthday, just before her well-deserved retirement, her coworkers and family give her a karaoke machine as a gift and urge her to sing. After much persuasion, she agrees and chooses the same song she sang as a child, "The Old Clock". During her performance, one of the inmates, Maria Star, a former opera singer and conservatory graduate nicknamed "The Lame" (played by Viktoria Isakova), secretly records Alevtina’s singing on her phone and uploads the video online. In a short time, the video garners over a million views and becomes a huge success. Alevtina catches the attention of talent scouts in Moscow and is invited to participate in a popular televised talent show, "Light Up!". She truly wants to change her life but is entirely unprepared for the competition. Maria Star, who is serving a three-year sentence for manslaughter under Article 107 of the Russian Criminal Code, helps Alevtina prepare for the performance and find her voice.

== Cast ==
- Viktoriya Isakova as Masha Star
- Inga Strelkova-Oboldina as Alevtina
- Vladimir Ilyin as Ivanych
- Tatyana Dogilevaas Yelena Sysoeva
- Anna Ukolova as Vera
- Aleksey Shevchenkov as Sergey
- Daniil Steklov as Mazhor
- Aleksandra Bortich as Zhenya, Sysoeva's daughter
- Yekaterina Ageeva as Shurka
- Olga Buzova as cameo
- Nikita Kologrivyy as overseer

== Production ==
The script is based on the true story of British singer Sam Bailey, the winner of the 10th season of musical TV show The X Factor (2013), who worked as a warden in a men's prison.

The main role in the script written by Pletnyov specifically for the actress Inga Oboldina, who starred in his short film Nastya. The second main female role was written for Ksenia Rappoport, but played it in the end Viktoria Isakova. Both Actresses sing with their voices, with the exception of Opera arias.
