= Dark like the Night. Karenina-2019 =

2019 Russian short film

Dark like the night. Karenina-2019
- Directed by: Radda Novikova
- Written by: Aleksander Tsypkin
- Produced by: Aleksander Malis
- Starring: Yulia Peresild; Ingeborga Dapkunaite; Konstantin Khabensky; Maksim Sukhanov; Matvey Lykov
- Cinematography: Yuri Nikogosov
- Music by: Boris Grebenshchikov
- Production company: Fresh Films
- Release date: March 20, 2019
- Running time: 8 minutes
- Country: Russia
- Language: Russian

Dark like the night. Karenina-2019 (Russian: Темная как ночь. Анна Каренина 2019, romanized: Tyomnaya kak noch. Anna Karenina 2019) is a Russian 2019 short film directed by Radda Novikova and written by Aleksander Tsypkin. The film is loosely based on Leo Tolstoy's 1877 novel Anna Karenina and features the song "Dark like the night" by Boris Grebenshchikov.

== Cast ==
- Yulia Peresild as Karenina
- Maksim Sukhanov as Karenin
- Matvey Lykov as Vronsky
- Ingeborga Dapkunaite as journalist
- Konstantin Khabensky as train driver

== Awards ==
The film received Best Music Video award at the Prague Independent Film Festival, and also received Best Short Film and Best Supporting Actor (Konstantin Khabensky) awards at the Vienna Independent Film Festival in 2019.
