= The Conductor (film) =

- Film poster
- Russian: Дирижёр
- Directed by: Pavel Lungin
- Written by: Pavel Lungin; Valery Pecheykin
- Produced by: Sasha Klein; Pavel Lungin; Yevgeny Panfilov
- Starring: Vladas Bagdonas; Inga Strelkova-Oboldina; Karen Badalov; Sergey Koltakov; Sergey Barkovskiy
- Cinematography: Igor Grinyakin; Aleksandr Simonov
- Edited by: Karolina Maciejewska
- Music by: Ilarion Alfeyev
- Production company: Pavel Lungin Studio
- Release date: June 2012 (Shanghai)
- Running time: 86 minutes
- Country: Russia
- Language: Russian

The Conductor (Russian: Дирижёр, romanized: Dirizhyor) is a 2012 Russian drama film directed by Pavel Lungin.

== Plot ==
The film tells about a conductor who goes to Jerusalem with his orchestra, but suddenly a tragedy happens.

== Cast ==
- Vladas Bagdonas as Vyacheslav Petrov
- Inga Strelkova-Oboldina as Alla
- Karen Badalov as Nikodimov
- Sergey Koltakov as Nadezhkin
- Sergey Barkovskiy as Pushenkov
- Darya Moroz as Olga
- Arseniy Spasibo as Senya
- Vsevolod Spasibo as Seva
- Ania Bukstein as Anna
- Andrei Sirotin as Dima
- Elena Antoshkina as Stewardess #2 (as Ye. Antoshkina)
