= Waiting for a Miracle (film) =

- Russian: В ожидании чуда
- Directed by: Yevgeny Bedarev
- Written by: Yevgeny Bedarev
- Produced by: Marianna Balashova; Sergey Gribkov; Paul Heth; Michael Schlicht; Ruslan Vitryanyuk
- Starring: Yekaterina Kopanova; Vladimir Krylov; Stanislav Bondarenko; Tatyana Vasilyeva; Nina Ruslanova; Anna Antonova
- Cinematography: Maksim Shinkorenko
- Edited by: Alexander Hachko
- Music by: Andrey Zuyev
- Production company: Monumental Pictures
- Distributed by: 20th Century Fox
- Release date: 2007
- Running time: 95 min.
- Country: Russia
- Language: Russian
- Box office: $4 459 800

Waiting for a Miracle (Russian: В ожидании чуда, romanized: V ozhidanii chuda) is a 2007 Russian romantic comedy-drama film directed by Yevgeny Bedarev.

== Plot ==
The film tells about a young girl Maya who is unlucky in her personal life and at work, but despite this she continues to believe that miracles do happen and she will meet love. And now the dream begins to come true.

== Cast ==
- Yekaterina Kopanova as Maya
- Vladimir Krylov as Fairy Paphnutius
- Grigory Antipenko as a passenger on an airplane
- Tatyana Vasilyeva as Renata Genrikhovna
- Nina Ruslanova as Valentina Petrovna
- Olesya Sudzilovskaya as Kate
- Mariya Aronova as seller of happiness
- Lev Durov as judge
- Sergey Zverev as cameo
- Stanislav Bondarenko as Marat
- Vladimir Dolinskiy as Advocate
- Artyom Tkachenko as passer-by
- Vladimir Epifantsev as trainer in a fitness club
