= A Dog Named Palma =

- Theatrical release poster
- Directed by: Aleksandr Domogarov Jr.
- Written by: Yekaterina Mavromatis; Aleksandr Domogarov Jr.; Yevgeny Kazachkov
- Based on: Waiting for Two Years by Yuri Rost
- Produced by: Ruben Dishdishyan (ru); Leonard Blavatnik; Anton Zlatopolskiy; Narek Martirosyan; Kristina Reylyan
- Starring: Viktor Dobronravov; Leonid Basov; Vladimir Ilyin; Valeriya Fedorovich; Evgeniya Dmitrieva; Igor Khripunov; Pavel Maykov; Vladimir Simonov
- Cinematography: Sergey Dyshuk
- Edited by: Maksim Smirnov; Aleksandr Domogarov Jr.
- Music by: Ivan Burlyayev (ru); Konstantin Kupriyanov; Dmitriy Noskov
- Production companies: Mars Media Entertainment; AMedia (ru); Russia-1; Okko Studios; Ministry of Culture; Cinema Fund
- Distributed by: Central Partnership
- Release date: March 18, 2021 (Russia)
- Running time: 110 minutes
- Country: Russia
- Language: Russian
- Budget: ₽95 million; ~$1 million
- Box office: ₽>341 million; >$5,449,847

A Dog Named Palma (Russian: Пальма) is a 2021 Russian children's drama film directed by Aleksandr Domogarov Jr., based on real events that took place in 1974–1976 at the Moscow's Vnukovo International Airport.

It was released theatrically on March 18, 2021, by Central Partnership.

== Plot ==
In 1977 Soviet Union, a German Shepherd named Palma was abandoned at airport by her owner who went abroad by plane .Palma hides at the airport and waits for her owner to return. She befriends nine-year old boy named Kolya Lazarev whose mother dies leaving him with a father he barely knows - a pilot who finds the dog at the airport. It is a story of amazing adventures, true friendship and unconditional love.

== Cast ==
- Viktor Dobronravov as Vyacheslav Lazarev, an aircraft commander
- Liliya (German Shepherd) as Palma
- Leonid Basov as Kolya Lazarev, a boy
- Vladimir Ilyin as Sergey Tikhonov, an airport technician, Nina Tikhonova's father
- Valeriya Fedorovich as Nina Tikhonova, a stewardess, Sergey Tikhonov's daughter
- Evgeniya Dmitrieva as Lyubov Zhurina, head of the flight squad of OJSC "Soviet Aeroflot"
- Igor Khripunov as Evgeny Golikov, head of the Soviet Security Service
- Anna Volkova as Anya
- Pavel Maykov as Georgy Krasilov, co-pilot
- Vladimir Simonov as Ivan Lysko
- Yan Tsapnik as Igor Polsky, owner of the shepherd Palma
- Filipp Savinkov as Kravchenko, a male flight attendant
- Darya Luzina as Anna, a flight attendant
- Elena Anisimova as Raisa Semenovna, an aviation cashier
- Bain Bovaldinov as Fedya, a policeman

== Production ==
In 1976 the Komsomol Truth published an article about this called Waiting for Two Years, written by Yuri Rost, in 1988, based on the article, a feature film was made Tethered to the Runway (ru), directed by Vladimir Khmelnitsky.

=== Casting ===
More than 300 children passed the casting for the role of the boy Kolya Lazarev, before the director approved Leonid Basov. For him, this is his film debut.

=== Filming ===
Principal photography of the film took place in one of the airports near Moscow and the Belarusian Brest. The local airport, which retained its Soviet interiors and was not very busy, was best suited to reproduce the atmosphere of the 70s. About 500 residents of Brest were used as extras for the crowd scenes.

== Release ==
The Russian premiere of the film took place on March 18, 2021 by Central Partnership.

== Sequel ==
In October 2021, the film's creators announced they had begun work on a sequel, Palma 2. It was scheduled for release on March 20, 2025.
