= Kyung-won (name) =

- Hangul: 경원
- RR: Gyeongwon
- MR: Kyŏngwŏn
- IPA: [kjʌŋwʌn]

Kyung-won, also spelled Kyong-won, is a Korean given name.

People with this name include:

- Park Kyung-won (1901–1933), Korea's first female aviator
- K. W. Lee (born 1928), Korean-born American male journalist
- Kyongwon Ahn (born 1937), Korean-born American male taekwondo master
- Na Kyung-won (born 1963), South Korean female politician and lawyer
- Moon Kyungwon (born 1969), South Korean female artist
- Lee Kyung-won (born 1980), South Korean female badminton player
- Yoon Kyung-won (born 1982), South Korean male ice hockey player
- Kwon Kyung-won (born 1992), South Korean male footballer

== See also ==
- List of Korean given names
