= Kirill Pletnyov =

Russian actor and film actor

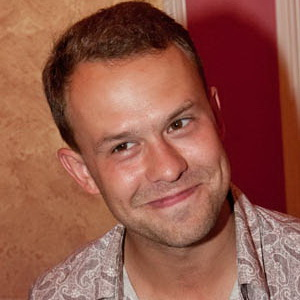
- Born: Kirill Vladimirovich Pletnyov; 30 December 1979 (age 45); Kharkiv, Ukrainian Soviet Socialist Republic, Soviet Union
- Occupation(s): actor, film director, film producer, film editor, screenwriter
- Years active: 2000–present
- Awards: Kinotavr (2015); Golden Eagle Award (2017)

Kirill Vladimirovich Pletnyov (Russian: Кири́лл Влади́мирович Плетнёв; born December 30, 1979, Kharkiv, USSR) is a Russian theater and film actor, film director, screenwriter, producer. Winner of the Sochi Open Russian Film Festival (2015) and Golden Eagle Award (2017).

== Selected filmography ==
Actor

- Deadly Force (2000) as Dmitry (2nd season)
- Bear's Kiss (2002) as Nick
- Children of the Arbat (2004) as Fyodor
- Russian Translation (2006) as investigator Kondrashov
- Nine Lives of Nestor Makhno (2005) as Vladislav Danilevsky
- The Admiral (2008) as midshipman Frolov
- High Security Vacation (2009) as Gennady Vasilkov
- The Priest (2009) as Aleksandr Lugotintsev
- August Eighth (2012) as tank driver
- Friday (2016) as Maxim
- Yolki 5 (2016) as Kostya
- Collector (2016) as Yevgeny (voice)
- The Perfect Ones (2018) as Vanya

Director

- Light Up! (2017)
- The Perfect Ones (2018)
- Seven Dinners (2018)
