= Azrael (film) =

2024 film by E. L. Katz

- Theatrical release poster
- Directed by: E. L. Katz
- Written by: Simon Barrett
- Produced by: Dan Kagan; Simon Barrett; Dave Caplan
- Starring: Samara Weaving; Vic Carmen Sonne; Nathan Stewart-Jarrett
- Cinematography: Mart Taniel
- Edited by: Ben Baudhuin
- Music by: Tóti Guðnason
- Production companies: Traffic.; C2 Motion Picture Group
- Distributed by: IFC Films; Shudder
- Release dates: March 9, 2024 (SXSW); September 27, 2024 (United States)
- Running time: 85 minutes
- Country: United States
- Language: Esperanto
- Box office: $666,611

Azrael is a 2024 American action horror film directed by E. L. Katz and written by Simon Barrett. The film stars Samara Weaving, Vic Carmen Sonne and Nathan Stewart-Jarrett. It premiered at the 2024 South by Southwest festival on March 9, 2024, and was released theatrically by IFC Films and Shudder in the United States on September 27, 2024.

== Plot ==
Years after the Rapture, the remaining human survivors on Earth are plagued by the Burned Ones, demonic humanoid creatures who are drawn to and prey upon human flesh and blood. Azrael and her lover, Kenan, are ousted from a forest-dwelling cult who believe that speech is a sin, and who have surgically removed their vocal cords to cease speaking. Josephine, one of the cult's leaders, captures and separates the couple with the help of her henchmen. The cultists attempt to sacrifice Azrael to the Burned Ones, but Azrael manages to escape, killing one of the henchmen in the process.

Azrael flees through the woods and infiltrates the cult's fenced encampment, where a woman named Miriam leads the cult as a spiritual interpreter, believing the wind speaks God's will, and listening to it through a hole in the wall of a ramshackle church. Azrael is discovered by Josephine and narrowly escapes the encampment. Late that night, Azrael stumbles upon a road where a man in a truck offers her a ride, but the vehicle crashes after a cultist shoots and kills the driver. After a protracted battle, Azrael manages to kill the cultist with his own rifle.

In the woods, Azrael finds Kenan nailed to a tree, and is caught in a booby trap by one of the cultists, leaving her dangling upside down by a rope. Several of the Burned Ones descend on the scene and attack and kill the cultist before also killing Kenan. Azrael manages to hoist herself onto a tree, hanging and killing one of the Burned Ones in the process.

Azrael returns to the encampment and confronts Miriam in the church. Azrael prepares to execute her, but pauses when noticing that Miriam is pregnant, allowing Miriam a moment to attack. Miriam incapacitates her, causing Azrael to scratch Miriam's pregnant stomach as she falls to the floor. At Josephine's behest, the cultists bury Azrael in a coffin connected to a tunnel where a Burned One descends upon her, but the creature stops and backs away after it senses Miriam's blood on Azrael's hand.

Enraged, Azrael manages to climb out of the buried casket and return to the encampment, lighting it on fire and assassinating the members of the group one by one. In the church, she confronts Miriam, and a fight ensues in which Azrael bites into Miriam's neck, severely injuring her. Miriam goes into labor while an injured Josephine comes to her aid, attacking Azrael. Azrael drives a cleaver into Josephine's neck, mortally wounding her just as the cries of Miriam's newborn baby are heard. Miriam recoils in horror from the child before slitting her own throat. Azrael approaches the newborn, which is revealed to be a goat-like creature resembling the Antichrist. As the Burned Ones enter the church, they all begin to wail, as Azrael smiles and stands holding Miriam's baby.

== Cast ==
- Samara Weaving as Azrael
- Vic Carmen Sonne as Miriam
- Nathan Stewart-Jarrett as Kenan
- Katariina Unt as Josephine

== Production ==
Azrael was announced in September 2022 with plans for E. L. Katz to direct the film written by Simon Barrett. Samara Weaving would star in the action-horror film. The film began shooting in Harju County, Estonia, in October 2022 with local production assistance from Katrin Kissa at Homeless Bob Production. The production had considered filming in Ontario, but decided on Estonia instead, with some post-production activities taking place in Estonia as well. Approximately 70% of the crew was hired locally, including cinematographer Mart Taniel, as were several cast members. The production created an artificial moon in the Pärispea forest during filming by using a system of connected floodlights hoisted by a crane.

The film is mostly without spoken dialogues - with a few exceptions of untranslated Esperanto spoken by a random passerby.

After filming was completed, it was taken to the 2023 European Film Market to find distribution. In September 2023, Republic Pictures announced that it purchased the North American distribution rights.

== Release ==
Azrael had its world premiere on March 9, 2024, at the South by Southwest festival in Austin, Texas. It also screened at the Overlook Film Festival on April 5, 2024, and at the 28th Fantasia International Film Festival on August 2, 2024. In July 2024, IFC Films and Shudder acquired North American distribution rights to the film from Republic Pictures, scheduling it for a theatrical release on September 27, 2024, before streaming on Shudder on October 25, 2024.

=== Home media ===
The film was released on Blu-ray and DVD by IFC Films on February 4, 2025.

== Reception ==
On the review aggregator website Rotten Tomatoes, 71% of 80 critics' reviews are positive, with an average rating of 6.2/10. The website's consensus reads: "Lead by another bloody fantastic performance from Samara Weaving, Azrael sacrifices depth on the altar of storytelling economy but delivers pure adrenaline in the bargain." Metacritic, which uses a weighted average, assigned the film a score of 52 out of 100, based on nine critics, indicating "mixed or average" reviews.
