= Shirin Abdullaeva =

Uzbek singer, model and actress (2005–2025)

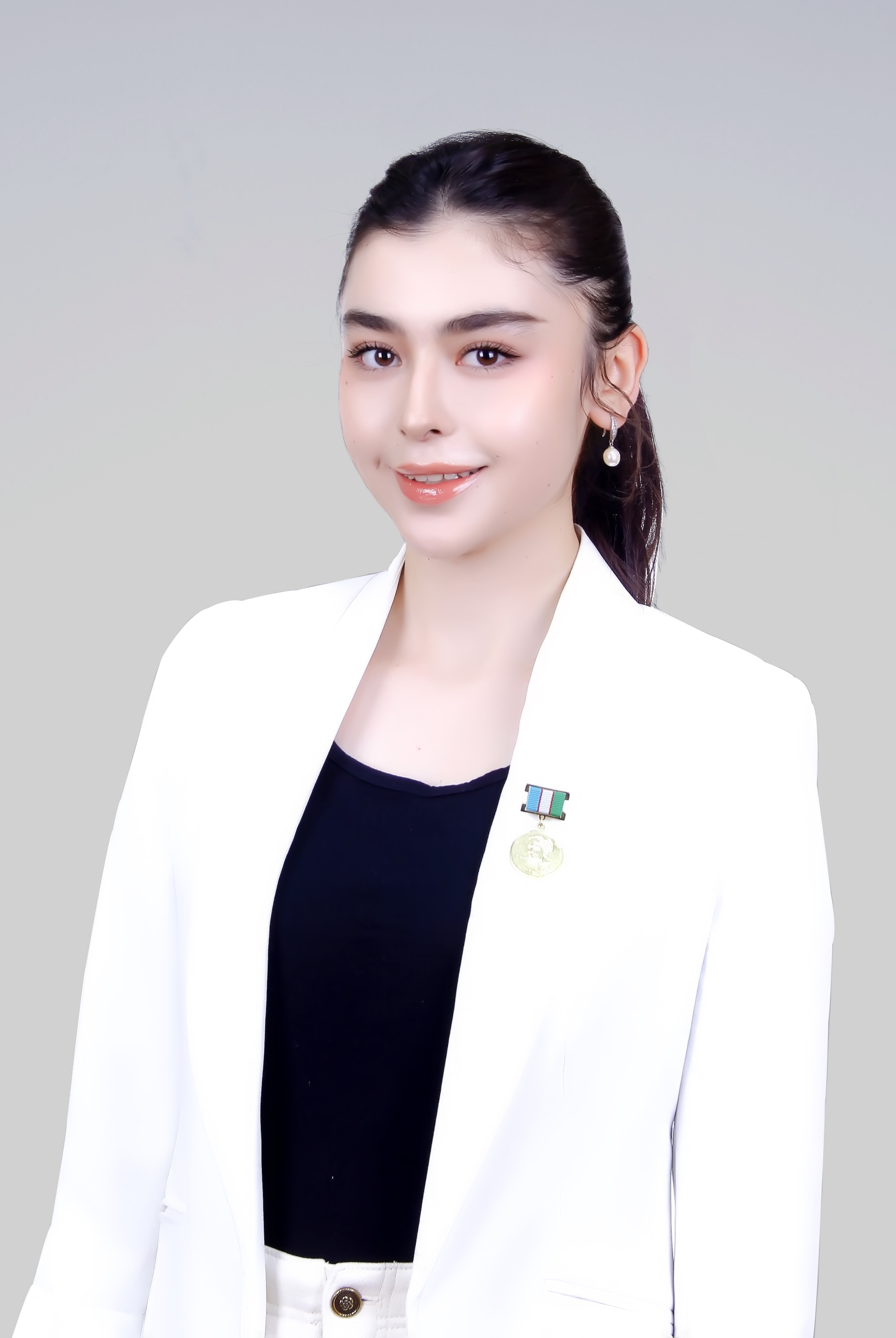

Background information
- Born: 14 December 2005; Namangan, Uzbekistan
- Died: 15 February 2025 (aged 19) Beijing, China
- Education: Tsinghua University
- Genres: Pop
- Occupations: Singer, actress, model
- Years active: 2008–2025
- Award: Zulfiya State Prize (2023)

Shirin Abdullaeva (14 December 2005 – 15 February 2025) was an Uzbek singer and actress based in China. She was nicknamed the "Voice of Central Asia" because of her multilingual ability and cross-cultural performances.

== Life and career ==
Born in Namangan, she began singing at age three and later composed her own music. Her popular songs included Luli, Metro, and Bezori. Abdullaeva represented Uzbek culture in major Chinese television galas and worked with Chinese singer Fei.

In 2022 she appeared in the Russian film Mister Knockout. Abdullaeva was a student at Tsinghua University. In 2023 she received the Zulfiya State Prize for the arts.

== Death ==
Abdullaeva died in Beijing on 15 February 2025 after an illness, reportedly meningitis, following a two-month coma.
