= Cop (TV series) =

Russian crime drama television series

- Genre: Crime drama; Police procedural; Comedy-drama
- Directed by: Radda Novikova
- Starring: Kirill Zaytsev; Anna Snatkina; Prokhor Dubravin
- Composer: Sergei Kashirin
- No. of seasons: 1
- No. of episodes: 8

Production
- Producers: Alexander Tsekalo; Aleksandra Remizova; Ivan Samokhvalov; Anastasia Fateeva
- Running time: 48 minutes
- Production company: Sreda

Original release
- Network: C1R
- Release: 27 May 2019

Cop (Russian: Коп) is a Russian crime comedy-drama television series produced by Sreda for Channel One Russia. The series is directed by Radda Novikova and stars Kirill Zaytsev and Anna Snatkina. The series is about an American police officer who comes to Russia to work with the local police. It debuted on 27 May 2019 on Channel One Russia.

== Plot ==
Under a professional exchange program, Sergeant John McKenzie arrives in Russia from the United States. The American not only becomes a partner of the investigator Vasilisa Vikhreva, but also temporarily settles in her apartment. It is hard for John and Vasilisa to work together - their differences in personalities and mentalities affect their relations. But the successful results of their joint investigations convince their superiors to create a special department to combat crimes committed by foreigners and against foreigners in Russia and put them in charge. Unraveling one case after another, the partners find themselves embroiled in an international spy game around a major scientific discovery.
