= The Perfect Ones =

2018 Russian film directed by Kirill Pletnyov

- Directed by: Kirill Pletnyov
- Written by: Darya Gratsevich
- Produced by: Ruben Dishdishyan; Nikolay Larionov; Andrey Yepifanov
- Starring: Lyubov Aksyonova; Polina Maksimova
- Cinematography: Mikhail Milashin
- Edited by: Ira Volkova
- Music by: Artyom Mikhayonkin
- Production companies: Columbia Pictures; Sinetrain; Mars Media Entertainment
- Distributed by: Walt Disney Studios Sony Pictures Releasing CIS
- Release date: 11 October 2018
- Running time: 97 minutes
- Country: Russia
- Language: Russian

The Perfect Ones (Russian: Без меня, romanized: Bez menya, meaning Without Me) is a 2018 Russian romantic drama film directed by Kirill Pletnyov. Starring Polina Maksimova and Lyubov Aksyonova. It is available in wide distribution in Russia on October 11, 2018.

== Plot ==
Two girls who loved one man, after his death receive messages, the author of which can only be him. In the hope of a miracle, the two of them will have to go on a journey, which his clues pave to reveal the secret behind the mysterious messages.

== Cast ==
- Lyubov Aksyonova as Ksenia
- Polina Maksimova as Kira
- Rinal Mukhametov as Dima
- Kirill Pletnyov as Vanya
- Anna Kamenkova as Ksenia's mother
- Evgeniya Dmitrieva as Roza
- Vladimir Yaglych as Anton
- Agrippina Steklova as Alyona
- Alexey Shevchenkov as owner of a roadside cafe

== Production ==
Filming lasted 28 shifts and took place in Moscow, Moscow Oblast, Anapa and in the most picturesque places of Krasnodar Krai. For filming the scene in the boat was used the longest camera crane in Russia. Its length is 27 meters.
