= Good as New =

2020 Russian comedy film

- Film poster
- Russian: Хэппи-энд
- Directed by: Evgeniy Shelyakin
- Written by: Konstantin Charmadov; Evgeniy Shelyakin; Pavel Usachev
- Produced by: Nadezhda Anikeeva; Alexey Fursov; Evgeniya Homchenkova
- Starring: Alina Astrovskaya; Evgeniya Dmitrieva; Mikheil Gomiashvili; Roza Khayrullina; Vladimir Mishukov; Charay Mueanprayun; Amporn Pankratok; Patchrida Paykaew; Polina Pushkaruk; Evgeniy Sangadzhiev; Anastasia Somova
- Cinematography: Kseniya Sereda
- Edited by: Daniel Ovrutskiy; Maria Sidelnikova
- Music by: Alexei Aigui
- Production companies: 2D Celluloid; Vita Aktiva; Columbia Pictures
- Distributed by: Sony Pictures Productions and Releasing
- Release date: August 1, 2020
- Running time: 152 minutes
- Countries: Russia; Thailand
- Language: Russian

Good as New (Russian: Хэппи-энд, romanized: Kheppi-end, lit. 'Happy End') is a 2020 Russian comedy film directed by Evgeniy Shelyakin.

== Plot ==
The film tells about a man who finds himself on a beach in Thailand and does not remember anything. He only knows Russian, but despite this he manages to organize an adventurous business. Nevertheless, despite the success, he did not understand why he flew here.

== Cast ==
- Alina Astrovskaya as Lena
- Evgeniya Dmitrieva as Irina
- Mikheil Gomiashvili as Xenophon
- Roza Khayrullina as Zima
- Vladimir Mishukov as Alexey
- Charay Mueanprayun as Buncha
- Amporn Pankratok as Niran
- Patchrida Paykaew as Pim
- Polina Pushkaruk as Mila
- Evgeniy Sangadzhiev as Lom
- Anastasia Somova as Katya
