= Two Fathers, Two Sons =

Television series

- Два отца и два сына
- Genre: Sitcom; Comic science fiction
- Created by: Alexander Trofimov, Sergei Sazonov, Dmitry Krepchuk,
- Directed by: Radda Novikova
- Starring: Dmitry Nagiyev, Maxim Studenovsky, Ilya Kostyukov, Victoria Lukina, Anna Yakunina, Galina Petrova, Victoria Chernysheva, Alexander Voronkov, Yuri Panov, Mikhail Danilin
- Country of origin: Russia
- Original language: Russian
- No. of seasons: 3

Production
- Producer: Radda Novikova
- Camera setup: Multi-camera
- Running time: 24 minutes
- Production companies: Yellow, Black and White

Original release
- Network: STS
- Release: October 21, 2013

Two Fathers, Two Sons (Russian: Два отца и два сына, romanized: Dva otsa i dva syna) is a Russian television sitcom produced by the company Yellow, Black and White. The show is broadcast by the Russian television STS.

== Overview ==
The series was introduced to the Russian audience in October 2013. The main protagonist of the show is Pavel Gurov, a famous actor who lives in his apartment in Moscow with his son and grandson.

The series has a similar premise to the American sitcom Two and a Half Men.

In the third season, Pavel Gyurov moves to a house in the suburbs, and finds out that he has another son - Dima. In contrast to Vitya, Dima inherited from his fathers qualities of inventiveness and cunning.

== Characters ==
- Pavel Gurov (Dmitry Nagiev) – Professional actor
- Victor Teterin (Maksim Studentovsky) – Psychologist
- Vladislav (Vlad) Teterin (Ilya Kostyukov) – student, son of Victor and grandson of Pavel
- Anna Teterina (Viktoria Lukina) - ex-wife of Victor and mother of Vlad
