= Girls with Makarov =

Russian TV series

- Written by: Anton Morozenko; Alexey Slushchev; Ilya Ipatov
- Directed by: Konstantin Smirnov (1); Radda Novikova (2–4); Sergey Harutyunyan (5)
- Country of origin: Russia
- Original language: Russian
- No. of seasons: 5
- No. of episodes: 100

Production
- Producers: Anton Morozenko; Taimuraz Badziev; Andrey Levin; Artur Dzhanibekyan; Vyacheslav Dusmukhametov; Alexey Slushchev (creat.); Ilya Ipatov (creat.); Zaur Bolotaev (creat.); Ella Skovorodina (ling.)

Original release
- Release: March 9, 2021 – February 6, 2025

Girls with Makarov (Russian: Девушки с Макаровым, romanized: Devushki s Makarovym), also known as Makarov and the Girls, is a Russian comedy television series produced by Comedy Club Productions. The main roles are played by Pavel Maykov, Alevtina Tukan, Vladislava Ermolaeva, Valeria Astapova and Elena Polyanskaya.

The series is about a tough police major Pavel Makarov who's in charge of the women's police division in Butovo. The show's title is a pun on the lead characters name and on the Makarov pistol.

The first season aired on TNT from March 9 to April 1, 2021. In the summer of 2021, new episodes were filmed for the second season. The second season premiered on January 31, 2022.

The series has been compared to Interns which was also made by the Comedy Club team, including director Radda Novikova.

== Plot ==
The head of the criminal investigation department in Butovo, police major Pavel Makarov, is sent four young graduates of the Academy of the Ministry of Internal Affairs. The newly minted lieutenants are very different both in appearance and in temperament: the ambitious brown-haired woman with honours Anna Turkina, the daring brunette Alexandra Popova, and the kind naïve single mother Olesya Verba, who thinks more about her three-year-old son than her work. At the same time, they all have one thing in common: with their inexperience, they greatly annoy their boss, who recently broke up with his beloved girlfriend (head of the Investigation Department, Olga Romanova). Despite Makarov's opposition, the young employees strive to prove that they are not in vain serving in the police.

== Cast ==
=== Main roles ===
Actor	Role
Pavel Maykov	Pavel Sergeevich Makarov Criminal Investigation Department in Butovo, Police Major
Olesya Sudzilovskaya	Olga Viktorovna Romanova Head of the Investigation Department, Major of Justice
Alevtina Toucan	Anna Andreevna Turkina Operative, Denis' girlfriend
Elena Polyanskaya	Olesya Viktorovna Verba Operative, Mother of Vitalik
Vladislava Ermolaeva	Alexandra Petrovna Popova Operative
Valeria Astapova	Ekaterina Dmitrievna Sinitskaya Operative

=== Minor roles ===
Actor	Role
Georgy Dronov	Roman Danilovich Zhilin Deputy Head of the Butovo District Department of Internal Affairs for the Protection of Public Order, Police Major
Dmitry Lysenkov	Denis Kurenkov criminologist, Anna's boyfriend
Sergie Astakhov	Vitaly Leonidovich Salamatin Police Colonel, Head of the Butovo District Department of Internal Affairs
Andrey Finyagin	Belov lieutenant colonel of police, deputy head of Moscow for operational work{{{1}}}
Andrei Pinzaru	Anatoly Kostylev senior lieutenant of police, on duty
Ivan Zhvakin	Maxim Alexandrovich Vershinin investigator, senior lieutenant of justice
Denis Shabiliy	Police captain
Anton Schwartz	Kravtsov
Maxim Ivanov	Vitalik Son of Olesya
Nelly Nevedina	Olesya's mother and Vitalik's grandmother
Peter Romanov	Nikolai Olesya's ex-husband and Vitalik's father
Igor Khripunov	Shulya Burglar, Recidivist
Alexey Sokolkov	Drug addict Dealer in stolen equipment

== Series ==
Season	Series	Broadcast period
1 Season	1-20 (20 episodes)	March 9 — April 1, 2021
2 Season	21-40 (20 episodes)	January 31 — February 24, 2022
3 Season	41-60 (20 episodes)	October 24 - November 23, 2022
4 Season	61-80 (20 episodes)	December 11-26, 2023
5 Season	81-100 (20 episodes)	January 20 — February 19, 2025

== Soundtrack ==
Band	Compositions
Warrant	Cherry Pie
Andy Powell and Emily Taylor	The Best You've Had
Ben Cocks	Unforgettable
