= Kirill Zaytsev =

Russian actor, film director and producer

- Кирилл Зайцев
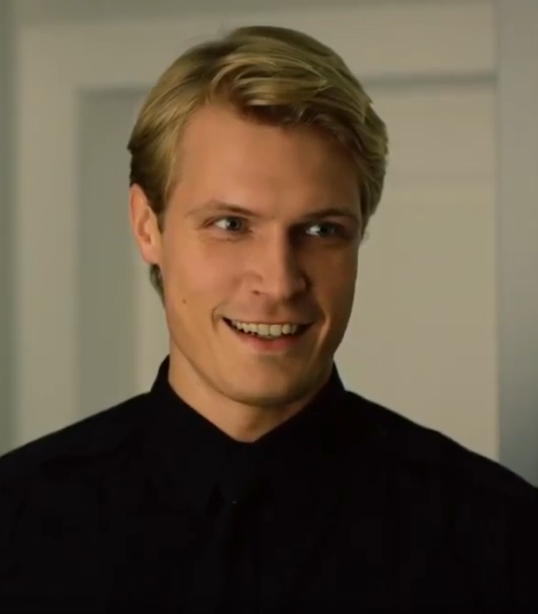
- Kirill Zaytsev, Cop (2019 TV series).
- Born: Kirill Andreyevich Zaytsev; August 16, 1987; Volgograd, RSFSR, USSR
- Citizenship: Russian
- Education: Admiral Makarov State Maritime Academy, Latvian Academy of Culture
- Occupations: Actor; film director; producer
- Years active: 2015–present
- Height: 1.94 m (6 ft 4 in)

Kirill Andreyevich Zaytsev (Russian: Кирилл Андреевич Зайцев; born August 16, 1987) is a Russian actor, film director, and producer. For his role in Going Vertical he received the Golden Eagle Award in 2019.

== Life and career ==
Kirill Zaytsev was born in Volgograd, Russian SFSR, Soviet Union (now Russia). In his youth he studied music, dancing, basketball. In 2011 he graduated from the Admiral Makarov State Maritime Academy, moved to Riga, where he was accepted into the troupe of The Mikhail Chekhov Riga Russian Theatre.

In 2016, Kirill Zaytsev starred in one of the main roles in the highest-grossing Russian film Going Vertical, playing the legendary Soviet basketball player Sergei Belov, based on whose book the film was filmed.

In 2018, he played the main role of American John Mackenzie, who comes to the Investigative Committee of Russia for the exchange of experience, - in the Channel One television series Cop by Radda Novikova.

Since 2018 he has been collaborating with the Moscow Provincial Theatre. Plays Nicholas I in Sergei Bezrukov's production of Pushkin about the Russian poet and Erast Fandorin in the production of Fandorin's Adventures. In 2021, Kirill Zaitsev acted in the premiere of the solo play My Lermontov staged by director Elena Chernaya. The script of the performance was written based on the poems, prose and letters of Mikhail Lermontov.

In 2020 Zaytsev directed his debut short film, war drama Sashka. A Soldier's Diary. The film won various awards at international film festivals, including the Prague Independent Film Festival (in 2021). It was also the first short film to have a wide cinematic release in Russia (in 2022).

In 2021, he took part in the ice-dancing TV show Ice Age on Channel One. His partner in the project was the Russian world champion figure skater Oksana Domnina. The couple reached the grand final and took third place.

In 2022 Zaytsev had a supporting role in streaming fantasy series Aeterna.

== Selected filmography ==
=== Film ===
List of film credits
Year	Title	Role	Notes
2016	The Chronicles of Melanie	Lieutenant of the NKVD troops	
2018	Going Vertical	Sergei Belov	
2018	Gogol. Terrible Revenge	Kazimir Mazovetsky	
2019	Union of Salvation	Mikhail Bestuzhev	
2020	The Silver Skates	Prince Arkadiy Trubetskoy (English: Prince Arkady Trubetskoy)	
2021	The Last Warrior: Root of Evil; The Last Warrior 2	Finist the Falcon, the bogatyr is a warrior	
2021	The Last Warrior: A Messenger of Darkness; The Last Warrior 3	Finist the Falcon	
2022	Mira	Antonov	
2024	Komandir	Gennady Zaytsev	
2025	Finist. The First Warrior	Finist the Falcon	
2025	The Crazy Empress		

=== Television ===
List of television credits
Year	Title	Role	Notes
2017	Trotsky	Fyodor Raskolnikov (English: Fedor Raskolnikov)	
2018	Godunov	Nechay Kolyvanov	
2019	Cop	John McKenzie	(ru)
2022	Aeterna	Lionel Savignac	

== Awards and nominations ==
- 2019 - Winner of the Golden Eagle Award in the nomination "Best Supporting Actor") - for the role of Soviet basketball player Sergei Belov in the feature film "Going Vertical".
- 2019 - Nominated for the TEFI Award in the category "Best Actor in a Television Film / Series" - for the role of John Mackenzie in the television series "Cop".
