= Natalya Merkulova =

Russian filmmaker (born 1979)

Natalya Fyodorovna Merkulova (Russian: Наталья Фёдоровна Меркулова; born 19 September 1979 in Orenburg Oblast) is a Russian filmmaker. She is well known for her films which she directs together with her husband Aleksey Chupov. Her directorial debut Intimate Parts (2013, co-directed with Alexey Chupov) was included in the Kinotavr film festival and won an award for the best debut, and The Man Who Surprised Everyone (2018, codirected with Aleksey Chupov) that was a members for the Horizons (Orizzonti) section of 75th Venice International Film Festival.

Her 2021 film Captain Volkonogov Escaped (codirected with Aleksey Chupov) was selected for the main competition at the 78th Venice International Film Festival.

== Awards and honors ==
- 2003 — Artyom Borovik Award of the International Press Club of America (documentary film The Cage).
- 2008 — Winner of the Special Jury Prize in the “Borders of Shock” competition at the Kinotavr Film Festival (documentary film Traumatism).
- 2013 — XXIV Open Russian Film Festival Kinotavr in Sochi (Intimate Parts):
  - Best Debut Award,
  - Diploma of the Guild of Film Scholars and Film Critics of Russia.
- 2018 — Festival of Russian Cinema in Honfleur: Grand Prix for the film The Man Who Surprised Everyone.
- 2018 — Award of the Russian Federation of Film Clubs for Best Film of the Year (The Man Who Surprised Everyone).
- 2019 — Zinegoak International Film Festival in Bilbao, Spain: Grand Prix for the film The Man Who Surprised Everyone.
- 2019 — Crossing Europe Film Festival in Linz, Austria: Best Fiction Film Award (The Man Who Surprised Everyone).
- 2019 — Uruguay International Film Festival: Grand Prix for the film The Man Who Surprised Everyone.
- 2019 — Al Este de Lima Film Festival, Peru: Grand Prix for the film The Man Who Surprised Everyone.
- 2019 — Kinenova International Film Festival in Skopje, North Macedonia: Best Screenplay Award (The Man Who Surprised Everyone).
- 2019 — International Film Award East–West. Golden Arch: Best Screenplay Award (The Man Who Surprised Everyone).
- 2019 — Pilot TV Series Festival, Ivanovo: Best Screenplay Award (TV series Call Center).
- 2021 — Kinotavr Film Festival: Grigory Gorin Award for Best Screenplay for the film Captain Volkonogov Escaped (jointly with Alexey Chupov)
- 2021 — Golden Unicorn Award:
  - Best Film — Captain Volkonogov Escaped (jointly with Alexey Chupov),
  - Best Screenplay — Captain Volkonogov Escaped (jointly with Alexey Chupov)

== Filmography ==
- Intimate Parts (2013)
- Yana+Yanko (2017)
- About Love. For Adults Only (2017, anthology film)
- The Man Who Surprised Everyone (2018)
- Call-center (2020, TV series)
- Captain Volkonogov Escaped (2021)
