= Stone (2012 film) =

- Theatrical release poster
- Directed by: Vyacheslav Kaminsky
- Produced by: Vyacheslav Kaminsky; Sergei Svetlakov
- Starring: Sergei Svetlakov; Olesya Sudzilovskaya; Nikolai Kozak; Yelena Koreneva; Valda Bickute; Aleksandr Kolesnikov
- Cinematography: Ruslan Gerasimenkov
- Edited by: Timofey Goloborodko; Yana Kulikova; Evgeniy Ryzhonkov
- Music by: Yuri Shevalin; DJ Shved
- Production company: Slava Film Company
- Distributed by: Bazelevs Group
- Release date: January 19, 2012 (Russia)
- Running time: 90 Minutes
- Country: Russia
- Language: Russian
- Budget: $2,000,000
- Box office: $4,069,176

Stone (Russian: Камень, romanized: Kamen) is a 2012 Russian crime thriller film directed by Vyacheslav Kaminsky (In English-speaking countries it was released as Orphan). It is based on the 2009 novel Do not live (Russian: Не жить, romanized: Ne zhit) by Yurii Brigadir.

The film was released on January 19, 2012 as a world premiere, but before that it was pre-screened in mid-December 2011 in select movie theaters in Russia. The film was released on DVD on February 16, 2012.

When a well-known businessman's 7-year-old son is kidnapped, it turns out that the mysterious kidnapper does not need any ransom, and his demand to the father is to commit suicide. For the next day he must decide who will die of the two: his child or himself.

== Plot ==
The film begins with the murder of an old man on a boatyard with a 200 mm nail. Then a 7-year-old boy named Kolya is kidnapped who turns out to be the son of businessman Vlad Gireyev. The kidnapper later calls the father, and confronts him with a choice: either Gireyev kills himself or the kidnapper will kill the son.

24 hours are allotted, until 6 pm. The kidnapper drives Kolya to a rented house on the lake in the suburbs, and keeps him there in a closed room with no windows. He treats the child roughly, but does not mock, hit, or starve him, takes the child outside immediately when he asks, takes him along for trips, permits to play computer games, gives tips on how to survive alone, teaches how to makes fire and shoot (the gun is not loaded), and then gives him a cartridge as a souvenir. He demands Kolya to call him "Stone". Although Stone seems gloomy to others, everyone thinks that he is a polite rich man. With the neighbor, who in the past was the headmistress of an orphanage, he often plays chess. Once he starts a conversation with her about former pupils, to which the woman makes uncomplimentary comments about orphans in general.

Vlad decides not to shoot himself and hires a professional special effects expert for staging suicide. On the phone, Stone puts pressure on Vlad's wife, urging her to kill her husband in order to save their son. And she almost does it, but at the last moment throws away the gun. Vlad can not figure out what he did to deserve the kidnapper's wrath.

Through flashbacks it turns out that Stone and Vlad grew up together in the same orphanage where they were mistreated by the headmistress and the physical education teacher. Once Vlad stole condensed milk from a warehouse, and Stone did not tell on him. Then Vlad persuades the boy to steal a folder with their personal affairs and to escape from the orphanage (Vlad hopes that his grandmother will take him, who for some reason did not issue guardianship over him). On the way, Vlad says to Stone that when he grows up, he will set his own rules, and no one will give orders to him. But after destroying the case folders, Vlad suddenly abandons Stone, claiming that his grandmother will not take the two of them. He only needed Stone to steal the folders – he was younger and could crawl under the window in to the archive. In parting, he hands him his nail, which was used as a weapon of self-defense. Realizing that in the orphanage he will be severely punished, and wish to be adopted was burned together with the case (before the escape he was eligible for adoption), Stone tries to cut his own throat using the nail. But he is caught and returned to the orphanage, where the headmistress and the physical education teacher torture the boy by dousing him in cold and hot water.

Vlad, using expensive tracking equipment, tries to track down Stone during telephone conversations, but Stone is skillfully encrypted. Finally, Vlad manages to get a personal meeting at a large parking lot where Stone furtively enters his car. When Vlad requires explanation, Stone puts a nail in front of him on the seat and leaves. Vlad understands. Stone visits his neighbor, who was headmistress of his orphanage (she does not recognize Stone) and kills her. It becomes clear that the dead man in the beginning of the movie was the former physical education teacher. At the appointed hour, Vlad goes to the square to stage a suicide, but under the pressure of conscience shoots himself. Even before the death of Vlad, Stone releases Kolya, drops him off on the road near the house. However, Stone does not feel the moral satisfaction from the death of Vlad – childhood's desire to avenge a betrayal eventually became the meaning of life to Stone, which is now simply gone. After some time, Stone, not feeling the desire to live, shoots himself too.

In the last scene on the river banks Kolya buries the cartridge, which Stone gave him. When his mother asks what he is doing, the boy replies: "Collecting stones", — in one scene, Stone, when explaining the reason for his vengeance against Vlad, he says: "It's time to collect stones."

== Cast ==
- Sergei Svetlakov - Pyotr Naidyonov "Stone"
- Olesya Sudzilovskaya - Natalia Giryeeva, Kolya's mother
- Nikolai Kozak - Vladimir "Vlad" Giryeev, Kolya's father
- Alexander Kolesnikov - Kolya Giryeev
- Valda Bichkute - Valya
- Yelena Koreneva - Kira
- Sergei Nasibov - Milevich
- Vyacheslav Harhota - Police Major
- Semyon Okonochnikov - Derbent
- Roman Volodkin - Lennon
- Pavel Ash - Technician
- Maria Kozlova - Kira in his youth
- Constantine Glushkov - physical education teacher
- Arseni Zaitsev - Pyotr as a child
- Dennis Tumashev - Vladimir as a child
