= Garbage Man (film) =

- Russian: Мусорщик
- Directed by: Georgy Shengeliya
- Written by: Yuriy Korotkov; Ivan Okhlobystin
- Produced by: Vasili Anisimov; Galina Belinskaya; Aleksei Guskov
- Starring: Aleksei Guskov; Olesya Sudzilovskaya; Yelena Baromykina; Aleksandr Berda; Yuriy Gorin
- Cinematography: Sergey Astakhov
- Edited by: Tatyana Egorycheva
- Music by: Aleksandr Chaykovskiy
- Release date: 2001
- Country: Russia
- Language: Russian

Garbage Man (Russian: Мусорщик) is a 2001 Russian romance film directed by Georgy Shengeliya. The film takes place in a small provincial town during the winter. The film tells about the relationship of the garbage man and a girl who, for some reason, ended up in this city.

== Plot ==
A young woman arrives in a small provincial town on a secret mission, where she meets a garbage man who, by night, transforms into a sophisticated and witty gentleman. Drawn to each other, they begin a game of trying to guess one another's pasts. Through this game, the woman reveals a surprising knowledge of the garbage man's background, which becomes evident in his reaction to her revelations. After several evenings together, fully convinced that he is the person she’s looking for, she offers him an advance of several hundred thousand dollars to "take out the trash" in his line of work. However, the garbage man declines and instead proposes that she stay and build a life with him there. Despite developing deep feelings for him, the woman, accustomed to a luxurious lifestyle, leaves the town without ever revealing her real name. Before departing, she calls her employers to inform them that the garbage man accepted the money from her.

== Cast ==
- Aleksei Guskov
- Olesya Sudzilovskaya
- Yelena Baromykina
- Aleksandr Berda
- Yuriy Gorin
- Vladimir Gusev
- Valeriy Ivakov
- Yuri Kolokolnikov
- Mikhail Levchenko
- Dmitri Matrosov
