= Call-center (TV series) =

- Genre: Thriller; Drama
- Created by: Natalya Merkulova; Alexey Chupov
- Written by: Natalia Merkoulova; Aleksey Chupov
- Directed by: Natalia Merkoulova; Alexey Chupov
- Starring: Pavel Tabakov; Yulia Khlynina; Vladimir Yaglych; Polina Pushkaruk; Sabina Akhmedova; Levan Khurtsia; Olga Venikova; Nikita Tarasov; Zoya Kaidanovskaya; Askar Nigamedzyanov; Egor Sheremetyev; Alisa Selnikova
- Theme music composer: The Grus – "A Secret Place"
- Composers: Liza Tikhonova; Mark Dorbsky
- Country of origin: Russia
- Original language: Russian
- No. of seasons: 1
- No. of episodes: 8

Production
- Executive producer: Maya Tszo
- Producers: Valery Fedorovich; Evgeny Nikishov
- Cinematography: Gleb Filatov
- Running time: 43–63 minutes
- Production company: 1-2-3 Production

Original release
- Network: TNT; Premier
- Release: 23 March – 2 April 2020

Call Center (Russian: Колл-центр) is a Russian television thriller drama series produced by Premier Studios and created by Natalya Merkulova and Alexey Chupov.

The series premiered on 23 March 2020 on TNT and the streaming service Premier. The TNT broadcast aired a censored 16+ version, while the uncensored 18+ version was released on Premier. The final episode aired on 2 April 2020.

In September 2019, the series won the award for Best Pilot Screenplay at the II Pilot TV Series Festival.

== Plot ==
Twelve employees of the call center of an online adult boutique are trapped on the 12th floor of the Gloria Plaza business center in Moscow. Suddenly, unknown criminals who call themselves "Mom" and "Dad" contact them and claim that the building is rigged with a bomb.

To prevent the explosion, the hostages must follow the criminals’ increasingly disturbing instructions. Over the course of eight hours, the employees are forced to confront their darkest secrets, moral boundaries, and fears.

== Cast and characters ==
Actor	Character	Description
Pavel Tabakov	Kirill Romanchuk	Call center operator, former medical student
Yulia Khlynina	Katya	Call center operator, Kirill's ex-girlfriend
Vladimir Yaglych	Denis Viktorovich	Head of the call center
Polina Pushkaruk	Liza Nekrasova	Operator, former ISIS captive
Sabina Akhmedova	Jemma	Cleaner, migrant worker
Levan Khurtsia	David	Delivery courier
Olga Venikova	Yana	Call center operator
Nikita Tarasov	Zhenya	Divorced father of four
Zoya Kaidanovskaya	Galina Maizel	Operator with mental illness
Askar Nigamedzyanov	Pavlik Borisov	Intern
Egor Sheremetyev	Vitalik	Call center operator
Alisa Selnikova	Sonya	Call center operator

== Production ==
According to Merkoulova and Chupov, the series was influenced by Lost and Black Mirror.

Filming took place at the Matrex business center in the Skolkovo Innovation Center.

In October 2020, producer Evgeny Nikishov announced that the series had been renewed for a second season, but it was never produced.
