= Swingers (2022 film) =

- Directed by: Dmitry Fiks; Andreys Ekis
- Written by: Slava Se; Andreys Ekis; Rasa Bugavicute-Pece; Viktoriya Bugaeva
- Produced by: Kristians Alhimionoks; Andreys Ekis; Dmitry Fiks; Sergey Fiks; Tatyana Ostern
- Starring: Dmitry Nagiyev; Irina Pegova; Ilya Noskov; Darya Rudenok; Natalya Rudova; Olesya Sudzilovskaya; Ivan Zlobin
- Cinematography: Yuri Bekhterev
- Production companies: Cinevilla Studio; Motor! Film Studio
- Release date: January 6, 2022
- Country: Russia
- Language: Russian

Swingers (Russian: Свингеры) is a 2022 Russian romantic comedy-drama film directed by Dmitry Fiks and Andreys Ekis. It was theatrically released in Russia on January 6, 2022.

== Plot ==
A wealthy businessman, his girlfriend Olga, who dreams of becoming a designer, doctor Andrey and his pharmacist wife Irina find themselves at a New Year swinger's party.

== Cast ==
- Dmitry Nagiyev as Igor
- Irina Pegova as Irina
- Ilya Noskov as Andrey
- Darya Rudenok as Svetka
- Natalya Rudova as Olga
- Olesya Sudzilovskaya as Tatyana
- Ivan Zlobin as Ivan
