= Alexey Chupov =

Russian film director (born 1973)

Alexey Vladimirovich Chupov
- Алексей Владимирович Чупов
- Born: Alexey Vladimirovich Chupov; May 29, 1973 (age 53); Moscow, Russian SFSR, USSR
- Occupations: Film director, screenwriter, producer, journalist
- Spouse: Natalya Merkulova

Alexey Vladimirovich Chupov (Russian: Алексе́й Влади́мирович Чу́пов; born 29 May 1973) is a Russian film director, screenwriter, and producer. He previously worked as a television journalist.

== Biography ==
Alexey Chupov was born on 29 May 1973 in Moscow to Vladimir Vasilyevich Chupov and Natalia Ivanovna Chupova.

In 1992, he spent several months studying under an exchange program at Wake Forest University (North Carolina, United States), where he studied world cinema history and completed a course in journalistic writing.

In 1993, he began working with the Moscow Television Channel (MTK) as a correspondent for the programs Moskovsky Teletype and Good Evening, Moscow. From 1995 to 1997, he served as a correspondent and one of the presenters of Moskovsky Teletype.

In 1995, Chupov graduated from the Faculty of Journalism of Lomonosov Moscow State University, Department of International Journalism.

From June 1997 to January 2000, he worked as a special correspondent for the news programs of the TV channel TV Center. He specialized in covering the activities of the Government of Moscow and the Mayor of Moscow. He accompanied Yury Luzhkov on official visits to the United States, the United Kingdom, Japan, Israel, and Germany. In early 1998, he covered the parliamentary elections to the Supreme Council of Crimea. In May 1998, he undertook an internship in Italy and Belgium under the TACIS program. In August 1998, he interviewed The Rolling Stones during their tour in Moscow.

In 2000, he hosted the television program Television of Special Purpose (Telespetsnaz) on RTR.

From October to December 2000, together with journalist Sergey Ageyev, he worked on the gubernatorial election campaign of Pskov Oblast governor Yevgeny Mikhailov. He was the author and host of the programs Pskovskoye Oko and Pskov-Scandal on the Pskov State Television and Radio Company.

From 2006 to 2009, Chupov served as Director of Special Projects at the PR agency Production Ru Communication Group.

In 2008, he completed an advanced professional course for screenwriters and directors taught by Alexander Mitta.

== Film career ==
Chupov made his directorial debut in 2013 with the drama Intimate Parts, which he co-wrote and co-directed with Natalya Merkulova. The film won awards for Best Debut and Best Actress, as well as a diploma from the Guild of Film Critics, at the Kinotavr Film Festival. It also received the Special Jury Prize at the Black Nights Film Festival in Tallinn and was screened at major international festivals including Karlovy Vary, Busan, and Gothenburg.

In 2016, Merkoulova and Chupov directed their first television series, Crisis of Tender Age, for the TNT channel.

Between 2017 and 2018, the Gogol trilogy starring Alexander Petrov was released, based on scripts by Merkoulova and Chupov. Streaming rights were acquired by Amazon Prime Video.

Chupov co-wrote the screenplay for the space drama Salyut 7, which won two Golden Eagle Awards, including Best Film and Best Editing.

In 2018, the drama The Man Who Surprised Everyone was selected for the main competition at the Venice Film Festival, where it won the award for Best Actress. The film later received two Nika Awards.

In 2020, the thriller series Call-center premiered simultaneously on TNT and the PREMIER streaming platform and won Best Screenplay at the Pilot Series Festival.

== Filmography ==
=== Director ===
- Intimate Parts (2013)
- Crisis of Tender Age (2016)
- About Love. For Adults Only (2017)
- The Man Who Surprised Everyone (2018)
- Call-center (2020)
- Captain Volkonogov Escaped (2021)

=== Screenwriter ===
- VKontakte with Classmates (2008)
- Sleeping District (2009–2010)
- Secrets of the First World War (2013, documentary series)
- Intimate Parts (2013)
- Yana + Yanko (2017)
- Gogol. The Beginning (2017)
- About Love. For Adults Only (2017)
- Salyut 7 (2017)
- Gogol (2018)
- Gogol. Viy (2018)
- Gogol. A Terrible Vengeance (2018)
- The Man Who Surprised Everyone (2018)
- Call Center (2020)
- Captain Volkonogov Escaped (2021)

=== Actor ===
- Intimate Parts (2013) — Sergey

=== Producer ===
- Rodchenko’s Staircase (2015, short film)

== Awards and nominations ==
- Kinotavr Film Festival (2013): Best Debut; Guild of Film Critics Diploma
- Honfleur Russian Film Festival (2018): Grand Prix — The Man Who Surprised Everyone
- Golden Unicorn Awards (2021): Best Film and Best Screenplay — Captain Volkonogov Escaped
