= Ilya Masodov =

Soviet writer

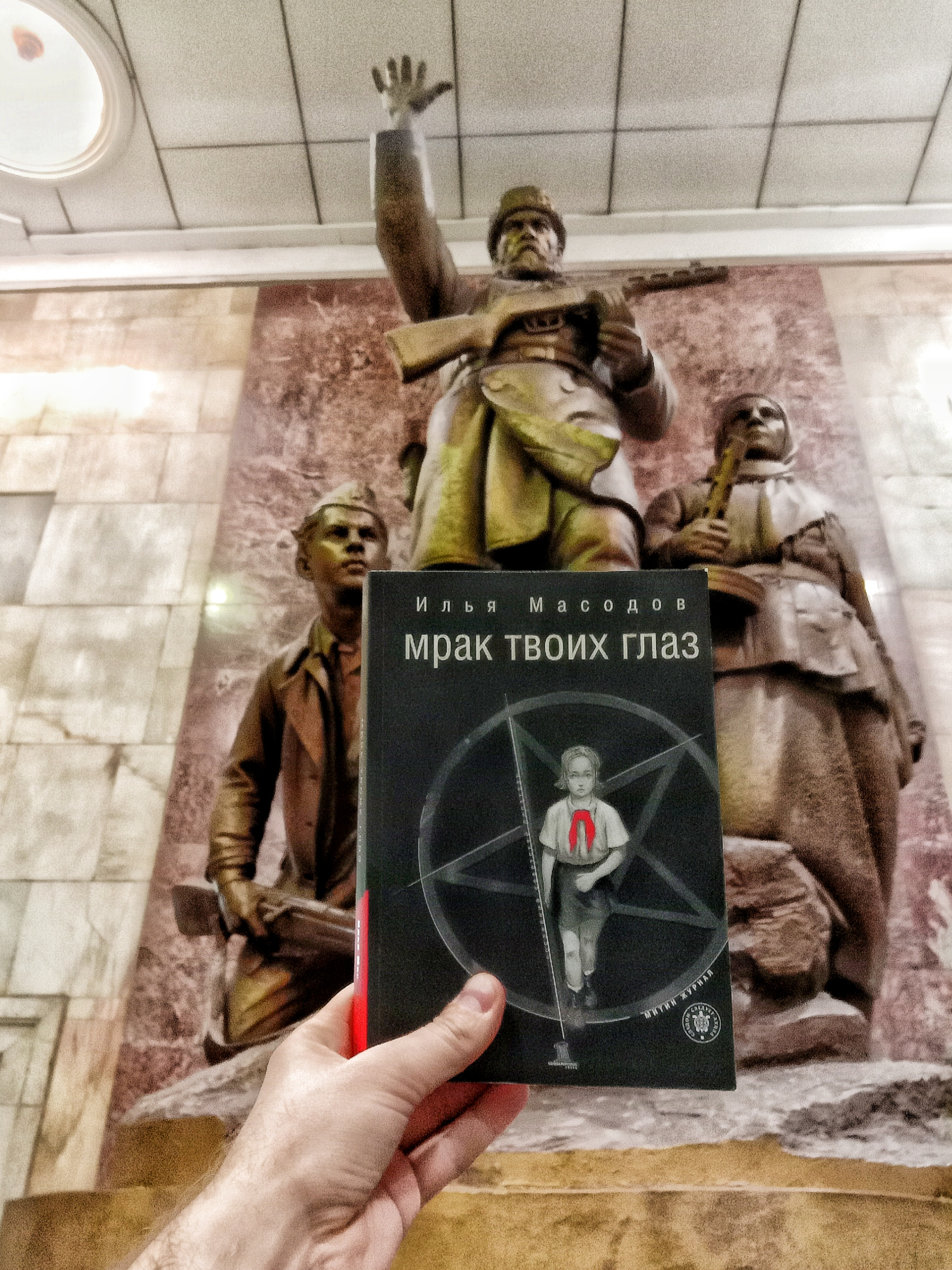
- Edition of the trilogy The Gloom of Your Eyes (2021) in front of a sculpture of Zoya Kosmodemyanskaya.

Ilya Masodov (unknown; some sources state 1966) is a modern Russian writer.

== Biography ==
According to the publisher, Ilya Masodov was born in 1966 in Leningrad. He worked as a school teacher for a while and moved to Germany. There is no trustworthy evidence of the existence of the writer. An agent of the writer, Dmitry Volchek, stated that Masodov is a real person, but Volchek himself is not aware of the fate of the writer after 2003.

== Debate over the identity of Masodov and the authorship ==
There is a discussion about whether Ilya Masodov is a real writer. According to one theory, Masodov is a pseudonym derived from the names of other Russian writers such as "Ma-" for Mamleev, "-so-" for Sorokin and "-dov" for Radov (or less commonly, for "Dovlatov"). Other people consider the name as an anagram from von Sacher-Masoch and Marquis de Sade. It is also argued that Ilya Masodov is a project of Marusya Klimova or her publisher named Dmitry Volchek.

== Style and language ==
Some critics found Masodov uses the "pared to the bones" creative approach of Vladislav Krapivin. Masodov works between two genres, namely "Necrorealism" and "guro" or "vampire horror".

== Works ==
Trilogy of novels 2001:

- The Gloom of Your Eyes (Мрак твоих глаз) - a mocking and surreal story about a teenage undead girl who travels across eschatologic post-soviet Russia to Black Moscow in order to raise Lenin from the dead.

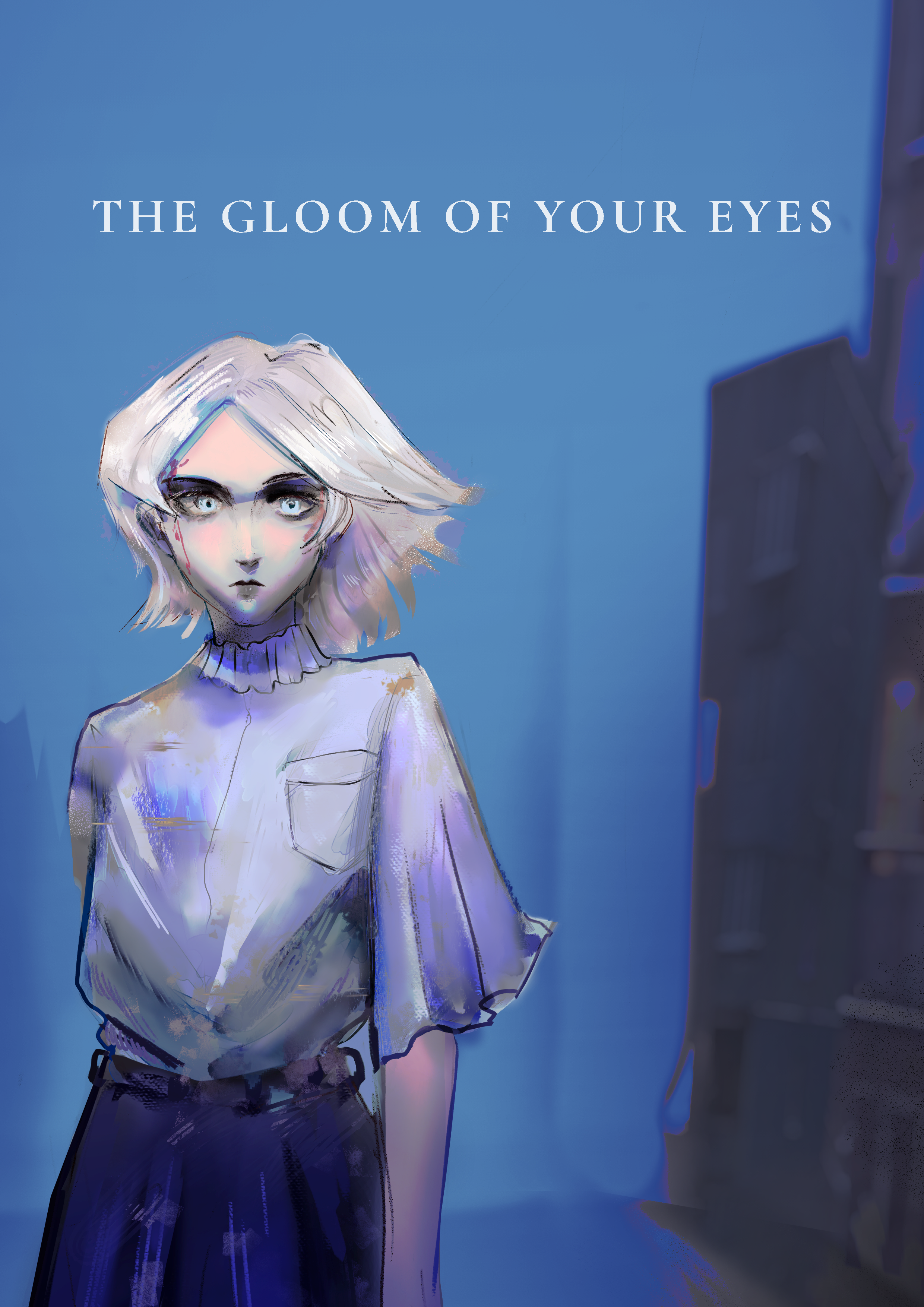
Cover of The Gloom of Your Eyes English translation

In early 2026, the first complete faithful English translation of the novella was released as an unabridged digital edition.

- The Heat of Your Hands (Тепло твоих рук)
- The Sweetness of Your Soft Lips (Сладость губ твоих нежных)

Additionally, a publisher of Masodov has stated that there is at least one unpublished novel by the author.

Another English translation is available here.

The second novella in the trilogy has also been translated.
