= Evgeniya Dmitrieva =

Russian actress

- Евгения Дмитриева
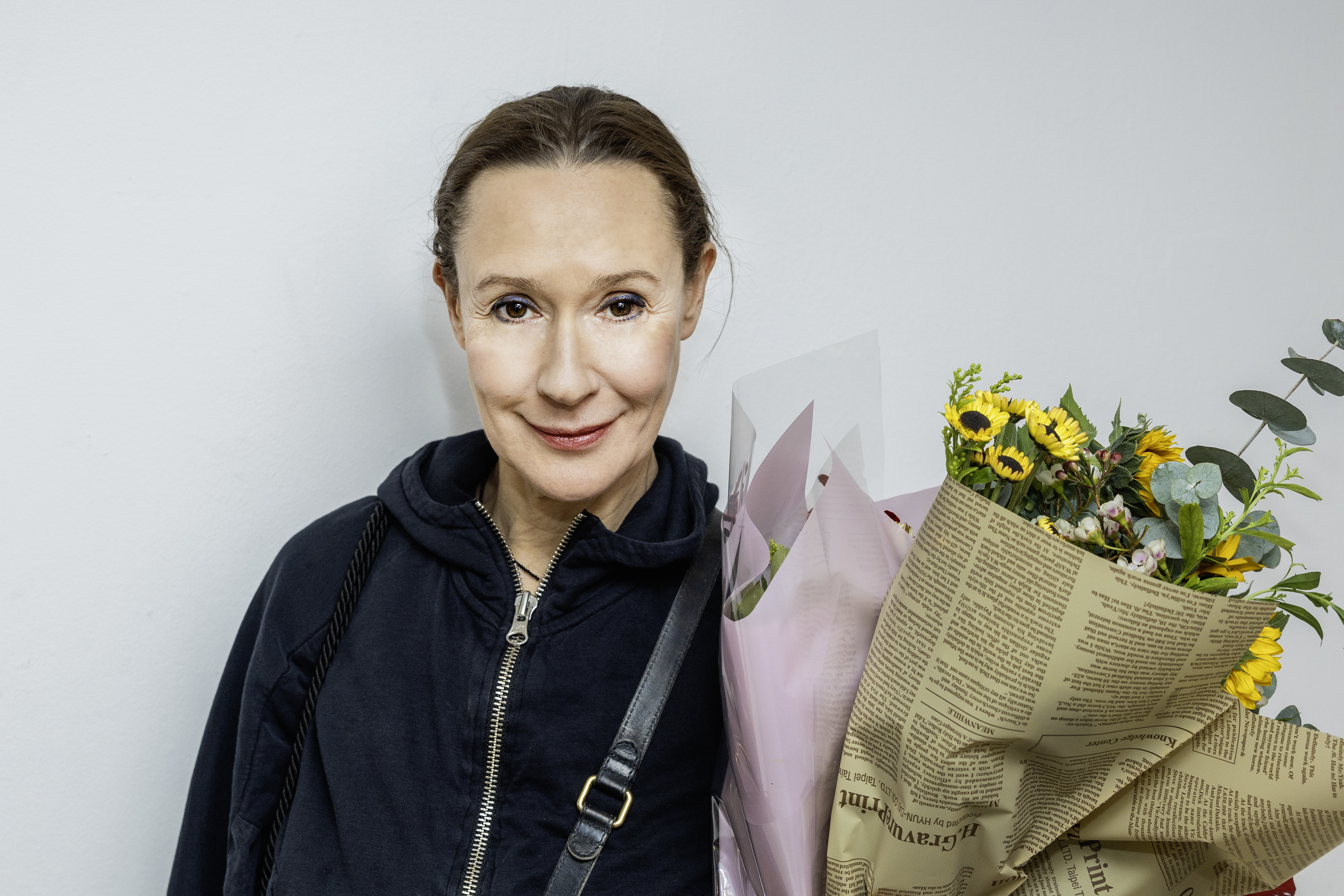
- Born: Evgeniya Olegovna Dmitrieva; 19 December 1972 (age 53); Moscow
- Occupations: Actress; Theatre director; Pedagogy
- Years active: 1994–present

Evgeniya Olegovna Dmitrieva (Russian: Евгения Олеговна Дмитриева; born 1972) is a Russian actress. She has appeared in over 140 films.

== Biography ==
Evgeniya Dmitrieva was born on December 19, 1972, in Moscow. Since childhood, she was fond of theater and attended the theatrical studio of the Kozhukhov House of Creativity. She studied at the Mikhail Shchepkin Higher Theatre School, after which she became part of the troupe of the Maly Theatre. In 1995 she made her film debut.

== Selected filmography ==
Year	Title	Role	Notes
1999	Chinese Service	Kvyatkovskaya	
2000	Brother 2	high school teacher	
2003	Bless the Woman	episode	
2005	Poor Relatives	Olga	
2011	Home	Tamara Shamanov	
2017	Loveless	hair stylist	
2018	The Perfect Ones	Roza	
2018	The Golden Horde	Matrena	
2020	Good as New	Irina	
2020	Fire	Nina	
2021	A Dog Named Palma	Lyubov Zhurina	
2023	The Librarian	Margarita Selivanova	
2025	Palma 2	Lyubov Zhurina	
