= Mark Boswell (film director) =

American cinematographer

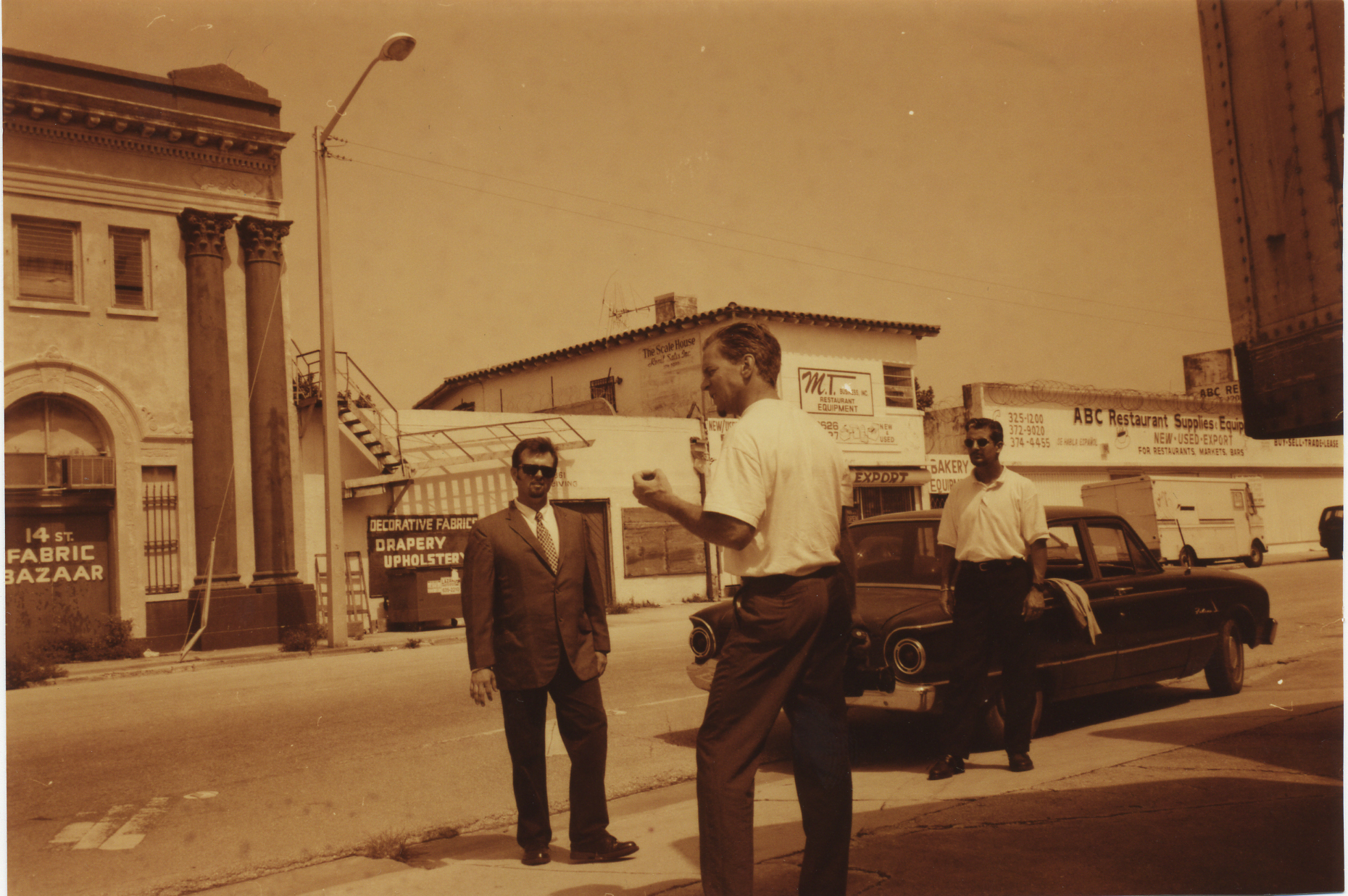
Mark Boswell (center) directing a scene in The Subversion Agency

Mark Boswell is the founder and leading theorist of the NOVA-KINO experimental cinema movement.

Born 1960 in Asheville, North Carolina, Boswell studied film, film theory, and art history in Switzerland, France, Germany and the Florida Space Coast from 1984–1992. He co-founded the Alliance Film/Video Cooperative in 1993 (with William Keddell) and the Anti Film Festival in 1994. Some of his most widely screened films are Unknown Unknown(s) (2009), USSA: Secret Manual of the Soviet Politburger (2001), Agent Orange, the feature film The Subversion Agency (2004) and the documentary 60 Seconds of Solitude in Year Zero.

For many years Boswell has taught at the San Francisco Art Institute, The Ringling College of Art and Design, Florida, and the Pratt Institute in New York. He was awarded the 2004 International Media Art Award from The ZKM Museum in Karlsruhe Germany for his film The End of Copenhagen. KultKino, Boswell's five minute 1997 experimental short film, was included in the 1999 Venice Biennale. He has also lectured internationally on agit-prop cinema at the UCLA Hammer Museum in Los Angeles, the Wolfsonian/FIU Museum Of Propaganda in Miami Beach, the Magis Film Conference in Italy, and the Ruskin School of Art at Oxford University, England. During the mid-nineties he edited numerous projects for Doris Wishman during the last phase of her career in Miami Beach.

== Cinematic style ==
Boswell’s work is sometimes noted for its elliptical montage structure featuring a wild concoction of appropriated film materials coupled with his own production footage. Another aspect of this process is his usage of subtitles over original scenes from iconic films that leads toward an entirely different storyline.

During the 2009 Cambridge Film Festival in England the British film critic Laura J Smith wrote: He refers to his work as “Nova-Kino” a pertinent cinematic theory for filmmakers and media artists alike who, as Boswell describes, “utilise found footage as source material to be re-edited or re-animated, giving radical rebirth or second life in their reconstructed state.” A vital element of Nova-Kino is “the usage of critical, political, and other highly charged points of view embedded within the structure of the work that challenge hegemonic power structures at large or in more specific realms.” By no accident, these aesthetics are undeniably similar to those of Agit-Prop cinema, which Boswell labels “the eternal bi-product of the Russian Revolution.”

In Helsinki 2003 during the Avanto Festival, for the European premiere of his first feature film The Subversion Agency – the Finnish film critic Manu Haapalainen wrote: The black and white film feels and looks like a version of Francis Ford Coppola's "The Conversation", set in Cuba, directed by Jean-Luc Godard and scripted by William Burroughs. The film's intricate and non-linear plot has to do with the adventures of an American arms dealer in a perplexing country called K-Zone. K-Zone is like a cross between Cuba and a kind of socialist America imaginable only in an alternative reality. "The Subversion Agency is an extremely stylish work on the level of both image and sound. The aged, grainy archival material has been allowed to dictate the visual look of the whole film. The soundtrack of The Subversion Agency" is chock full of something resembling electronic music, hissing sounds, beeps and interferences. The film's narrative is repeatedly interrupted by auditive and visual discontinuities and disturbances. The experience is voyeuristic and somewhat enigmatic.

== Nova-Kino manifesto ==
Nova-Kino is an experimental cinematic movement with departure points from the Russian twenties, film noir, situationism, the classical avant-garde, and post-modern appropriationist theory. The movement is blatantly left with variations of classical anarchism, situationism and Marxist paranoia of unrestrained capitalism. Nova-Kino is a technologically advanced medium that incorporates digital, celluloid, analog, and pseudo-redundant motion picture technologies that en somme, actualize the free market mantra of "the democratization of technology." Nova-Kino's fire-brand critique of Capitalism, Americanism, and Technotopia will make its acceptance into the traditional venues of exhibition, distribution, and production DIFFICULT - but not impossible. Nova-Kino is an investigation into the political structure of the past, present, and future. It does not operate under any sequential formula. Therefore, it is a Buddhist attack on the narrative structure of History. However, unlike the old guard/avant-garde, Nova-Kino wholeheartedly embraces the telling of "stories." Nova-Kino is therefore the simultaneous raconteur of the past and prophet of the present. Nova-Kino does not recognize the traditional property rights of the West. More specifically, the further Hollywood advances its tautological consumerism on Society, the further WE attack! Nova-Kino is like an Indian Casino; paradoxical, autonomous, and ultimately wise...

== Filmography ==
- Nova Conspiracy (currently in post-production)
- Trust, But Verify (2016)
- Boswell on T.V. (2013)
- Royal Flush (2011)
- Unknown Unknown(s) (2009)
- The St.Petersburg Paradox (2007)
- The End of Copenhagen (2004)
- The Subversion Agency (2003)
- Deep Blue (2003)
- Stars & Stripes Forever (2003) Music Video Collaboration with experimental electronic group Matmos (Matador Records)
- Agent Orange (2002)
- USSA: Secret Manual of the Soviet Politburger (2001)
- The Life and Times of Harry D.Boswell (2001)
- Liquidation of the Wild West (2000)
- Golf Caddies and Madness (2000)
- Galaxie 500 (1999)
- Rausch & Burn (1999)
- Vast Floridias (1999)
- Maintenance (1998)
- KultKIno (1997)
- The Memory Corporation (1996)
- State Sponsored Cinema (1995)
- Words Eat Death (1994)
- The Football Man (1993)
- The Job (or) the Home Movies of V.I. Lenin (1992)
- Mongoloid (1992)

== Gallery ==
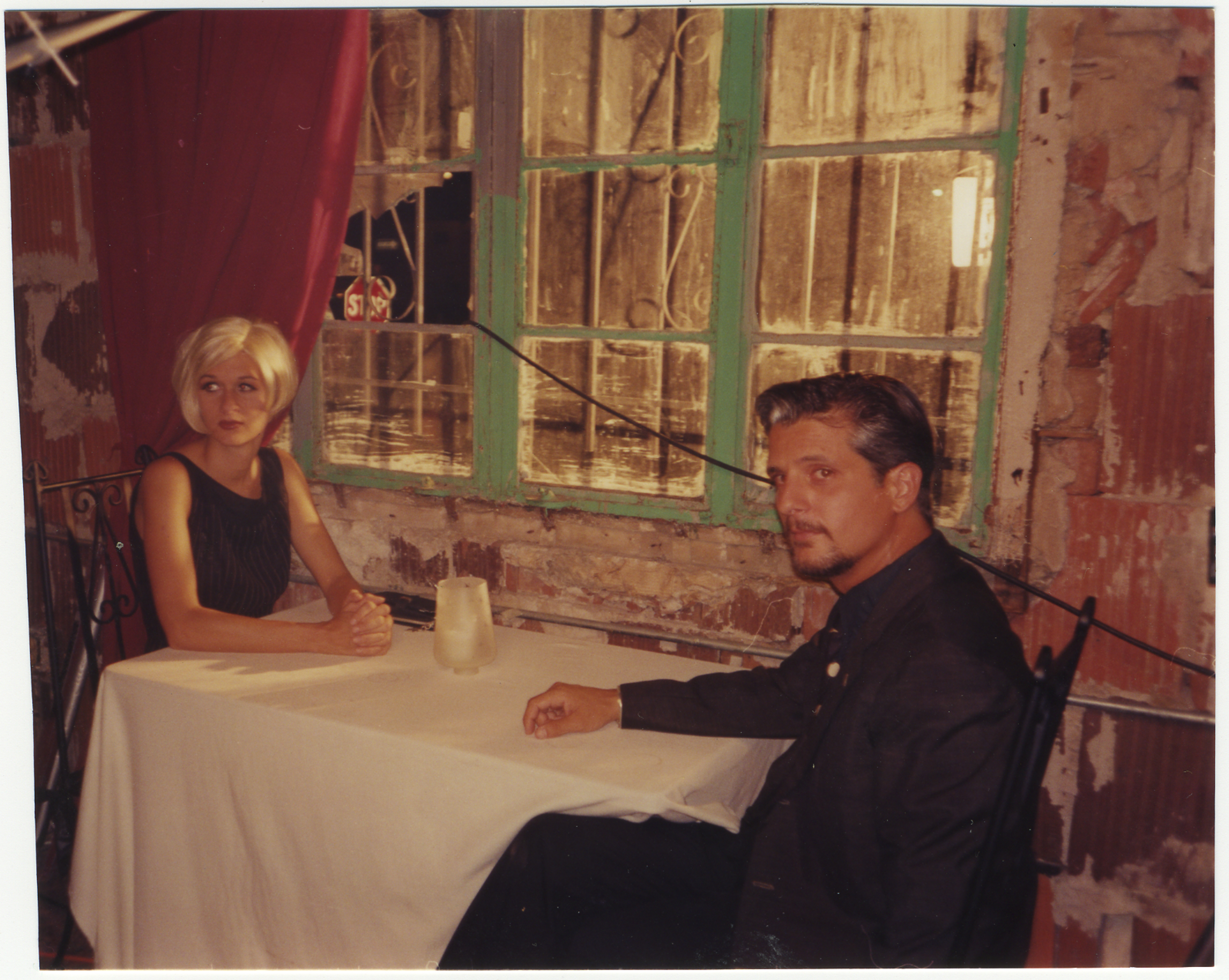
Susanne Boswell and Gregg Shumann in The Subversion Agency

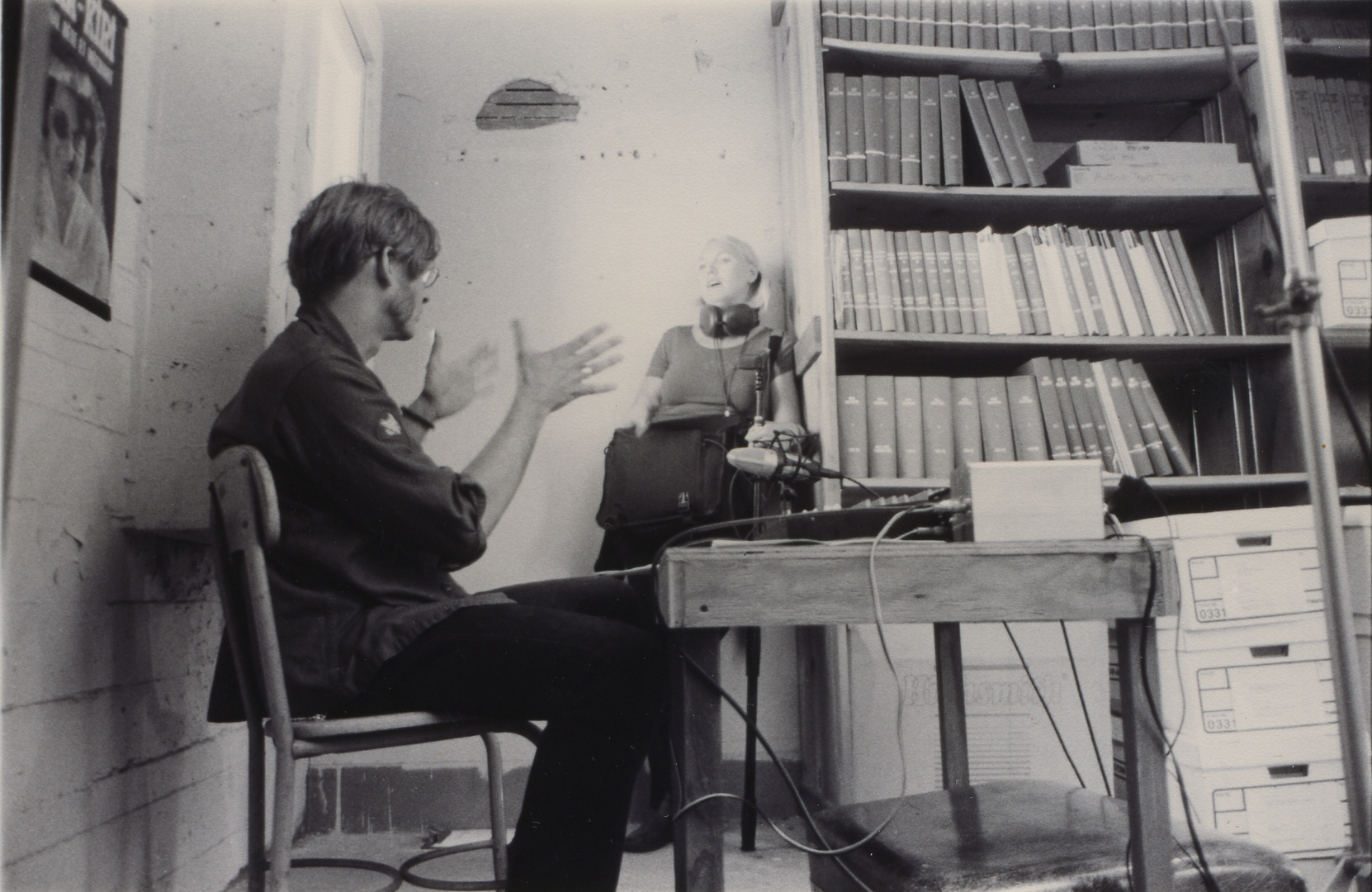
Miles Sherwood and sound recordist Synne Bull during radio broadcast scene in The Subversion Agency
