= Pavel Maykov =

Russian actor

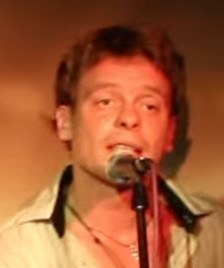
Maykov in 2012

Pavel Sergeevich Maykov (Russian: Па́вел Серге́евич Ма́йков; born October 15, 1975, in Mytishchi) is a Russian theater, film and voice actor, TV presenter, singer and musician. Maykov is best known for starring as Viktor Pchyolkin in the TV series Brigada and in the title role of sitcom Girls with Makarov. He is the older brother of singer and actress Anastasia Stotskaya.

== Life and career ==
Maykov was born on October 15, 1975. His father was a driver and mother an artist from a noble family. From 1982 to 1992 he lived in Kyiv, Ukraine.

In 1992 he graduated from high school No. 1 there. In 1994 he entered GITIS as an actor of the drama theater (workshop of Pavel Chomsky), which he graduated in 1998. In the graduation performance The Two Gentlemen of Verona based on the play by William Shakespeare, he played one of the main roles of Proteus.

Maykov was part of the Mossovet Theater troupe in the years 2000–2005.

Pavel Maykov's acting breakthrough came in 2002 when he starred in the cult Russian crime miniseries Brigada as the public-enemy gang member Viktor "The Bee" Pchyolkin. In 2018 Maykov described the series as a crime against Russia because he felt the popular series glamourised violence and influenced young people into becoming criminals.

In 2003 he participated in the Russian version of the Fort Boyard game show. The team also included Ernest Mackevicius, Ekaterina Guseva, Vladimir Vdovichenkov, Dmitry Dyuzhev and Elena Vykhodtseva (Winnings - 90,030 rubles)

In 2011, Maykov together with actor Mikhail Prismotrov founded the band "ButterBrodsky" where he himself composed the music and used lyrics from existing poems, including by Joseph Brodsky. In 2017 he founded another music group - "Magrit".

In 2020 Maykov was cast as police major Pavel Makarov who's in charge of the women's police division in procedural sitcom Girls with Makarov which airs on TNT. As of 2022, two seasons of the series have aired, and the third is set to air.

In 2021 he starred in drama television series Contact by Yevgeny Stychkin. 9 episodes of the series have aired.

=== Personal life ===
- First wife (2001-2005) - Ekaterina Maslovskaya, actress and singer (born 1982)
  - Son - Daniil Maykov (born 2003)
- Second wife (since 2006) - Maria Saffo (Slidovker), actress (born 1978)

== Selected filmography ==
- 2002 — Brigada as Viktor Pchyolkin
- 2017 — You All Infuriate Me as Arseny, Galya's husband
- 2017 — Maximum Impact as security guard at the cigar club
- 2017 — The Man Who Surprised Everyone as Zakhar
- 2018 — Ice as Gena
- 2019 — Tobol as Alexander Danilovich Menshikov
- 2020 — Sherlock in Russia as Lavr Trudniy
- 2020–2025 — Girls with Makarov as Pavel Makarov
- 2021 — A Dog Named Palma as Georgy Krasilov
