= Moon Kyungwon =

Seoul-based artist

- Hangul: 문경원
- Hanja: 文敬媛
- RR: Mun Gyeongwon
- MR: Mun Kyŏngwŏn

Moon Kyungwon and Jeon Joonho, El Fin Del Mundo, 2012, HD Film installation view at Documenta Halle

Moon Kyungwon (Korean: 문경원; born 1969) is a Seoul-based artist who received her Masters of Fine Arts from the California Institute of the Arts (CalArts) and Ph.D in Visual Communication from Yonsei University, South Korea. Moon held her solo exhibition at the Fukuoka Asian Art Museum in 2004. Her recent exhibitions include Poiesis of Collective Intelligence at Yamaguchi Center Arts and Media in 2013 and A Different Similarity at BOCUM Museum, Germany in 2010. In 2012, Moon and a fellow artist, Jeon Joonho, participated in Documenta (13) in Kassel, Germany and collectively received the 2012 Noon Award Grand Prize and 2012 Korea Artist Prize at Gwangju Biennale. In 2013, the two artists put on a large-scale exhibition called News from Nowhere at the Sullivan Galleries inside the School of the Art Institute of Chicago (SAIC). Curated by Sook-Kyung Lee from Tate Modern, Moon Kyungwon and Jeon Joonho were selected to showcase their collaborative video installation, The Ways of Folding Space and Flying at the Korean Pavilion for 2015 Venice Biennale. Moon currently works and resides in Seoul, South Korea and teaches at the College of Art and Design, Ewha Womans University
