= Interns (TV series) =

- Интерны (Interny)
- Genre: Sitcom
- Written by: Vyacheslav Dusmukhametov
- Directed by: Maksim Pezhemsky; Zaur Bolotayev; Radda Novikova
- Starring: Ivan Okhlobystin; Aleksandr Ilyin Jr.; Oksana Akinshina; Vadim Demchog; Odin Biron; Kristina Asmus
- Country of origin: Russia
- Original language: Russian
- No. of seasons: 14
- No. of episodes: 280

Production
- Running time: 25 minutes

Original release
- Network: TNT
- Release: 29 March 2010 – 25 February 2016

Interns (Russian: Интерны, romanized: Interny) is a Russian medical sitcom, produced by NTV-Kino. The show aired on TNT Russia channel from 29 March 2010 to 25 February 2016.

== Premise ==
The sitcom follows various staff working at a hospital. The staff includes four young inexperienced medical interns, who constantly get into troublesome situations. Their mentor, Andrey Bykov, harshly and jokingly mentors them.

== Series overview ==
Seasons	Episodes	Release date	Directors
1	1—20 (20 episodes)	31.03.2010 — 05.05.2010	Maxim Pezhemsky, Zaur Bolotayev
2	21—40 (20 episodes)	15.06.2010 — 21.09.2010	Zaur Bolotayev, Milan Kilibarda
3	41—60 (20 episodes)	31.01.2011 — 04.03.2011	Evgeny Nevsky
4	61—80 (20 episodes)	30.05.2011 — 04.07.2011	Evgeny Nevsky, Milan Kilibarda, Radda Novikova
5	81—100 (20 episodes)	29.08.2011 — 29.09.2011	Milan Kilibarda, Radda Novikova
6	101—120 (20 episodes)	02.04.2012 — 26.04.2012	Radda Novikova
7	121—140 (20 episodes)	27.04.2012 — 01.11.2012	Radda Novikova
8	141—160 (20 episodes)	25.01.2013 — 22.05.2013	Radda Novikova
9	161—180 (20 episodes)	23.05.2013 — 25.09.2013	Radda Novikova
New year episode № 1		31.12.2013	Dina Shturmanova
10	181—203 (23 episodes)	03.02.2014 — 13.03.2014	Dina Shturmanova
11	204—223 (20 episodes)	06.10.2014 — 06.11.2014	Dina Shturmanova
New year episode № 2		31.12.2014	Kirill Sedukhin
12	224—238 (15 episodes)	09.02.2015 — 05.03.2015	Dina Shturmanova
13	239—258 (20 episodes)	07.09.2015 — 07.10.2015	Kirill Sedukhin
14	259—278 (20 episodes)	25.01.2016 — 25.02.2016	Giorgi Kalatozvilishvili

== Characters ==
- Dr Andrey Bykov (Ivan Okhlobystin) is the sarcastic and cynic head of the therapy department, who combines some features of both Perry Cox (from Scrubs) and Gregory House (from House M.D.). While he does often say that he hates being in charge of the interns, when asked to fire one he could not pick one, claiming that they were all "equally bad". At the beginning of the first season, it was mentioned multiple times that he is a recovering alcoholic (for example, when he is criticised by his best friend, Dr Kupitman, for being less fun now that he is sober in episode 1), but he has since been seen drinking, suggesting that this storyline has been dropped. His relationship with Dr Kisegach has later caused problems between him and Romanenko. Bykov is very fond of video games, which is often used for comic effect. Bykov has a 20-year-old daughter, Alisa, from his previous marriage and in the 180th episode, Bykov's son Ilya is born. Bykov is a former biker and is still known in that environment as "Lizard"; in several episodes we can see his biker-pals, like "Boar". His fetishistic love for his bike, Izolda, and a plant, Igor, sometimes proves useful to the interns in emergencies.
- Semyon Lobanov (Aleksandr Ilyin Jr) is one of the interns. He is physically big, and often intimidates people (most often his fellow intern Levin). He is often violent, having no qualms about hurting people, particularly those who annoy him. He is a former boxer (master of sports) and in one of the episodes he engages in a boxing match with his patient while the staff of the hospital make bets. Lobanov often tries to make some money on the side, indulging in somewhat illegal or morally ambiguous activities and always fails due to his irresponsibility and laziness. At the start of the show, he was the only married intern and his wife, Olga, was a lawyer (in one episode, it was mentioned that she graduated cum laude). The two of them had trouble conceiving a child, and it was revealed that Lobanov's slow-moving sperm were to blame for this. Lobanov's reluctance to quit smoking or drinking led to a rift between him and his wife, and the two filed for divorce in Season 3. In the 180th episode, Lobanov's daughter has been born. In the latest episodes he works in the receiving department and rarely appears in the series.
- Boris "Borya" Levin (Dmitrijus Šarakojis) is another intern. Levin graduated from university cum laude and believes that he is by far the most intelligent and medically gifted of the interns. He also considers himself Bykov's favourite. He is socially inept (he always gets himself beaten and tricked by his patients and colleagues) and has trouble making his opinion heard. He is bullied by both Romanenko and Lobanov. He lost his virginity to, and entered into a long-term relationship with the senior nurse, Lyubov Scriabina. She is older and rather mothering. Levin is physically scrawny and wears thick glasses. He would like to one day win the Nobel Prize. He left the show during the third season to pursue an internship at the Princeton–Plainsboro Clinic in America (this is an homage to the television series House M.D.).
- Gleb Romanenko (Ilya Glinnikov) is Dr Kisegach's son from a previous marriage. He has no desire to be a doctor, but succumbed to pressure from his mother, who financially supports him and with whom he lives. He partied a lot in med school and thus has a lot of knowledge regarding clubs and drugs. He had many one night stands, and a reputation as a womanizer. He is by far the worst doctor of the four interns. He is crafty and witty, but mostly uses his connections to get by. Since the beginning of the show, Romanenko has shown interest in Chernous, and hated Bykov for sleeping with Kisegach, but it is implied that the two have genuine affection for each other. Romanenko has the most antagonistic relationship with Bykov, mostly because of the older man's sexual relations with his mother. He is friends with Lobanov and Phil and they even live together in seasons 2 and 3. In the latest episodes Romanenko is engaged in a relationship with Sophia, a new intern and the niece of Kupitman.
- Varvara "Varya" Chernous (Kristina Asmus) is the only female intern and is frequently subjected to derogatory, stereotypical remarks on being female, naive, and needing a man to get by. Although she initially rejected Romanenko's advances due to his reputation, the two eventually embarked on a relationship, which has since ended (in part due to Chernous developing a crush on Bykov). Chernous is smart and compassionate, and thus is a fairly good doctor, but her overemotional reactions sometimes get her into trouble. In Season 3, she transfers to surgery, mostly because of the much nicer staff. While initially dismayed that Bykov took the news so well (he immediately snapped out of his depression), she then learns that he's glad that one of his charges has finally spread their wings to leave the nest.
- Dr Ivan Kupitman (Vadim Demchog) is the head of the dermatovenerology department and Dr Bykov's best friend who gladly supports him when the latter plays pranks on interns. A Russian Jew, and an alcoholic, he is intelligent and cunning, but more often a ladies’ man and a passionate individual. He has a fondness for cognac and reacts extremely sensitively to remarks about his indulgence, as well as his appearance and age. In his work, he considers himself a priest of Venus, the goddess of love, as he treats patients afflicted by her. He is known as an everyday philosopher, which is why many seek his advice.
- Dr Darya "Dasha" Skryabina (Oksana Akinshina) is the senior nurse of the therapy department, later transferred to the dermatovenerology department. Skilled and efficient at her job, yet overly amorous and talkative, she is known as a gossip and maintains friendships with Dr Kupitman and Dr Bykov. She was briefly engaged in a romantic affair
- Dr Anastasia Kisegach (Svetlana Kamynina) is the chief physician of the hospital. She is Romanenko's mother and Dr Bykov's long-time love mate. A woman of stern character, she only occasionally shows sentimentality.
- Lyubov "Lyuba" Skryabina (Svetlana Permyakova) is the senior nurse of the therapy department, later transferred to the dermatovenerology department. Skilled and efficient at her job, yet overly amorous and talkative, she is known as a gossip and maintains friendships with Dr Kupitman and Dr Bykov. She was briefly engaged in a romantic affair with Levin. Prone to daydreaming, though she deliberately presents herself as a woman of vast experience—particularly in front of Varya.
- Philip "Phil" Richards (Odin Biron) is an American intern from Boston who came to Russia as an exchange resident from Princeton-Plainsboro Clinic, replacing Levin. Phil debuted in the series in 67th episode. He was raised by gay fathers. Upon learning that a new intern would join his department, Dr Bykov was outraged and gave Phil a cold reception. Realizing that Phil was just as much of a know-it-all as Levin had been, Bykov decided to send him back home. Unlike Boris, who was solely focused on medicine, Phil had a broad academic curiosity, including other sciences. Well-versed in law, he attempted to reform hospital procedures. Despite his fluent Russian, Phil occasionally struggles to understand his fellow interns. Over time, he adapted to the new environment, gradually improving his relationships with colleagues and superiors.

== Comparison and similar shows ==
Similarities have been noted between Interny and American shows, for example House M.D. and Scrubs. Although the show is officially original, the parallels are undeniable. Like Scrubs, the show is centered on the lives of interns having to put up with an unreasonable (yet talented) boss. Also, the show has used "daydream" scenarios that echoed J.D's daydreams. Bykov's derogatory comments towards Chernous also echoed Cox's nicknaming Elliot "Dr Barbie". Like Elliot, Chernous revealed that she previously tried to commit suicide. She is also good friends with Lybov Mihaylovna, the Head Nurse, like Carla Espinosa was friends with Elliot. Also, Scrubs saw the Head Nurse enter a relationship with one of the interns (Turk) and similarly, Lybov started dating Levin.

House and Bykov similarly share traits, and parallels between the Huddy relationship and Bykov's relationship with Kisegach are easy to see. Chernous echoes early Cameron, especially with her reluctance to enter relationships and her moral high-ground. Both entered relationships with the less talented sons of renowned doctors, after much pursuit on the part of the men (Cameron dated, and eventually married and divorced, Chase, whilst Chernous had a failed relationship with Romanenko). Moreover, Chernous also developed a crush on Bykov which echoed an early House plotline which involved Cameron being in love with her boss. Interny has referenced these similarities with a tongue-in-cheek attitude, which include a House spoof episode that centred on Bykov trying to get his interns to diagnose a "difficult case" in House's typical style, and many of House's favourite diagnoses were rattled off. This episode also used the House catchphrase "Everybody Lies" repeatedly, for comic effect. It involved Bykov spraining his ankle and walking around with a cane. Bykov also tells a tale about him being a model for House because some American producer was much impressed with him while getting in the hospital several years before. Interny also paid homage to House by naming Princeton–Plainsboro Teaching Hospital as the clinic where Levin intends to do an internship.

== The prohibition on display and distribution in Ukraine ==
On December 9, 2014 the State Agency of Ukraine for Cinema banned showing and distributing the series Interns in Ukraine, along with another 70 films and TV shows featuring Ivan Okhlobystin. According to the department, the ban is related to anti-Ukrainian chauvinist actions of Okhlobystin, and violation of the ban on entry to Ukraine. Shortly before the activists, including members of "Boycott Russian Films", protested about the ban.
