= Mart Taniel =

Estonian film director

Mart Taniel (born 11 August 1976 in Tallinn) is an Estonian cinematographer and film director.

2000-2005 he studied at Tallinn University in operator speciality.

== Filmography ==
- Tühirand (2006)
- Müümise kunst (2006)
- Jan Uuspõld Iäheb Tartusse (2007)
- Sügisball (2007)
- Püha Tõnu kiusamine (2009)
- Free Range (2013)
- 1944 (2015)
- November (2017)
- Captain Volkonogov Escaped (2021)
- Azrael (2024)
