= List of Russian films of 2023 =

A list of films produced in Russia in 2023 (see 2023 in film).

== Box office ==
The highest-grossing Russian films released in 2023, by global box office gross revenue, are as follows:

Highest-grossing films released in 2023
Rank	Title	Distributor	Worldwide gross
1	Cheburashka	Soyuzmultfilm	$77,609,926
2	Wish of the Fairy Fish	CTB Film Company	$28,782,236
3	The Challenge	Channel One	$23,404,037
4	Tzadik	Studio Trite	$7,800,584
5	Baba Yaga Saves The World	Fresh Film	$6,857,309

== Film releases ==
Opening		Title	Russian title	Cast and crew	Details
J A N U A R Y	1	Cheburashka	Чебурашка	Director: Dmitry Dyachenko; Cast: Olga Kuzmina, Sergei Garmash, Fyodor Dobronravov, Elena Yakovleva, Polina Maksimova, Sergei Lavygin	Central Partnership / Yellow, Black and White / START Studio / Soyuzmultfilm; The film is based on the children's book Gena the Crocodile and His Friends by Eduard Uspensky.
J A N U A R Y	1	Grom: Boyhood; Major Grom. Special	Гром: Трудное детство	Director: Oleg Trofim; Cast: Kay Aleks Getts, Sergey Marin, Aleksei Vedernikov, Vladimir Yaganov, Daniil Vorobyov, Irina Rozanova	Digital release by KinoPoisk / Bubble Studios; This is a prequel to the superhero movie Major Grom: Plague Doctor and tells about the childhood of Police Major Igor Grom and his father's work.
J A N U A R Y	5	Clipmakers	Клипмейкеры	Director: Grigory Konstantinopolsky; Cast: Alexander Gorchilin, Aleksandr Kuznetsov, Mariya Shalayeva, Vladimir Epifantsev	"Cinema Atmosphere" film distribution / CTB Film Company
F E B R U A R Y	9	To Be	Быть	Director: Aleksandr Kovtunets; Cast: Oleg Gaas, Dmitry Vlaskin, Margarita Abroskina	National Media Group film distribution A young rapper finds himself in the past and must do everything not to disappear from the future.
F E B R U A R Y	9	Loose Relationship	Свободные отношения	Director: Dmitry Nevzorov; Cast: Aglaya Tarasova, Boris Dergachev, Ilya Sobolev	"KaroRental" film distribution / 1-2-3 Production; A romantic film in which a couple decides to try an open relationship to save their unhappy marriage.
F E B R U A R Y	14	Naughty	Непослушная	Director: Dmitry Suvorov; Cast: Alexander Petrov, Anastasiya Reznik, Semyon Arzumanov	Erotic drama film
F E B R U A R Y	16	Tzadik	Праведник	Director: Sergei Ursuliak; Cast: Aleksandr Yatsenko, Sergei Makovetsky, Fyodor Dobronravov, Yevgeny Tkachuk, Mark Eidelstein, Lyubov Konstantinova	Central Partnership / Russia-1 / Moskino Film Studio / Studio Trite / WeiT Media; Soviet partisan Nikolay Kiselyov (soldier), who led 200 Jews out of the ghetto in the Belarusian village of Dolginovo, USSR behind the front line.
F E B R U A R Y	16	The Snow Queen & The Princess	Снежная Королева: Разморозка	Director: Aleksey Tsitsilin, Andrey Korenkov; Voice cast: Irina Chumantieva	VLG.FILM / Wizart Animation
F E B R U A R Y	23	Rabies	Бешенство	Director: Dmitry Dyachenko; Cast: Aleksei Serebryakov, Vsevolod Volodin, Yevgeny Tkachuk	VLG.FILM / Backup Copy / Hype Film; The film is based on the real story of the wild animal rabies outbreak in the Amur Oblast in 2019.
M A R C H	2	Intensive Care	Здоровый человек	Director: Pyotr Todorovsky; Cast: Nikita Yefremov, Irina Starshenbaum, Yevgeny Tkachuk	"KaroRental" film distribution
M A R C H	2	Nuremberg	Нюрнберг	Director: Nikolai Lebedev; Cast: Sergey Kempo, Lyubov Aksyonova, Yevgeny Mironov, Sergey Bezrukov, Aleksey Bardukov, Igor Petrenko	National Media Group film distribution / Cinema Production Producer Center; Historical film about the preparation and course of the international military tribunal in 1945-46.
M A R C H	4	Fine Line	Между отчаянием и надеждой	Director: Anna Barsukova	This documentary was shot in the urban-type settlement of Sinegorye, Yagodninsky District, Magadan Oblast.
M A R C H	8	Off the Rails	Поехавшая; Traveling by bike	Director: Anton Maslov; Cast: Olga Lerman, Viktor Khorinyak, Dmitry Chebotaryov, Elena Yakovleva, Askar Ilyasov	Central Partnership / Yellow, Black and White / START Studio; A road movie based on the book Why stay at home?, which is based on the real story of Anna Smolina.
M A R C H	16	Emergency Landing	На солнце, вдоль рядов кукурузы	Director: Sarik Andreasyan; Cast: Egor Beroev, German Modyagin, Olga Khokhlova	Aviation film about the successful emergency landing of a passenger plane near Zhukovsky on August 15, 2019.
M A R C H	23	The Doll Master	Кукольник	Director: Sergey Kuznetsov; Cast: Polina Ryashko, Vitaliya Korniyenko, Mariya Mironova	AVK`PRO / Gorky Film Studios; The sisters find themselves puppets in the hands of an otherworldly puppeteer - a teen horror thriller.

Opening		Title	Russian title	Cast and crew	Details
A P R I L	6	The Flood	Наводнение	Director: Ivan Tverdovskiy; Cast: Anna Slyu, Sofya Shidlovskaya, Maxim Shchyogolev	Cinema Art Pro film distribution / New People Film Company
A P R I L	6	Live	Прямой эфир	Director: Karen Oganesyan; Cast: Kirill Käro, Pavel Chernyshyov, Irina Voronova	The White Nights film distribution company / Kargo Film / Irsna Media
A P R I L	13	Doctor	Доктор	Director: Artyom Temnikov; Cast: Sergei Puskepalis, Olga Tsirsen, Igor Chernevich	AVK`PRO / AT production
A P R I L	13	Zoskin Gas Station	Зоськина заправка	Director: Natalya Uglitsky; Cast: Zoya Berber, Grigory Siyatvinda, Aleksandr Samoylenko	"Paradise" film distribution / Paradise Production Center
A P R I L	20	The Challenge	Вызов	Director: Klim Shipenko; Cast: Yulia Peresild, Miloš Biković, Vladimir Mashkov, Andrey Shchepochkin, Aleksandr Baluev, Igor Gordin, Alexey Barabash, Alexey Grishin, Yelena Valyushkina	Central Partnership / Roscosmos / Channel One / Yellow, Black and White / START Studio; Space docudrama film by Klim Shipenko with Yulia Peresild, which was filmed aboard the International Space Station, 400 km above the Earth's surface.
A P R I L	27	Baba Yaga	Яга и книга заклинаний	Director: Vladimir Sakov; Voice cast: Yulia Khlynina, Fyodor Bondarchuk, Lidiya Chistyakova-Ionova	National Media Group film distribution / Art Pictures Studio / Gluk’oza Animation; Based on Baba Yaga.
M A Y	11	14+: Continued	14+: Продолжение	Director: Andrey Zaytsev; Cast: Gleb Kalyuzhny, Ulyana Vaskovich, Olga Ozollapinya	Central Partnership; The sequel to the 2015 film 14+.
M A Y	18	Khitrovka. The Sign of Four	Хитровка. Знак четырёх	Director: Karen Shakhnazarov; Cast: Konstantin Kryukov, Mikhail Porechenkov, Alexander Oleshko, Anfisa Chernykh, Alexey Vertkov	"KaroRental" film distribution A detective film inspired by the work of Arthur Conan Doyle, based on the works of Vladimir Gilyarovsky. It is set in Khitrovka, 1902.
M A Y	26	Here's to You and Us!	За нас с вами	Director: Andrei Smirnov; Cast: Yuliya Snigir, Andrey Smolyakov, Irina Rozanova	
J U N E	8	The Sun Tastes	Солнце на вкус	Director: Eldar Salavatov; Cast: Leonid Basov, Kamila Yakubova, Aleksandr Ilyin	
J U N E	8	Three Minutes of Silence	Снегирь	Director: Boris Khlebnikov; Cast: Makar Khlebnikov, Oleg Savostyuk, Aleksandr Robak, Timofey Tribuntsev, Yevgeny Sytyy	"Cinema Atmosphere" film distribution / Globus Film Studio / CTB Film Company
J U N E	15	Forgotten Experiment	Сквозь время	Director: Alexandr Boguslavsky; Cast: Egor Koreshkov, Viktor Dobronravov, Valeriya Shkirando	National Media Group film distribution / KinoDanz (KD Studios)

Opening		Title	Russian title	Cast and crew	Details
A U G U S T	24	Ruslan and Ludmila. More than a Fairy Tale; The Rebel Princess	Руслан и Людмила. Больше, чем сказка	Director: Alexey Tsitsylin, Vladimir Nikolaev, Alexey Zamyslov; Voice cast: Artem Krylov, Irina Obrezkova, Valentin Morozov, Artem Kazyukhanov, Alexander Bykovsky	VLG.FILM / Voronezh Animation Studio / CTB Film Company; This animated feature film is a modern version of Pushkin's poem Ruslan and Ludmila.
S E P T E M B E R	7	Holidays	Праздники	Director: Boris Dergachev; Cast: Vitaly Khaev, Mariya Aronova	Central Partnership / Good Story Media / TNT; Comedy film: will the Pyzhovs be able to save their family when everything secret becomes clear?
S E P T E M B E R	21	Lost in the North	Чужая	Director: Alexey Lukanev; Cast: Anna Slyu, Artyom Tkachenko, Nyurgun Bechigen	National Media Group film distribution / Noah Film Company
S E P T E M B E R	28	1993	1993	Director: Alexander Veledinsky; Cast: Ekaterina Vilkova, Yevgeny Tsyganov, Aleksandr Robak	"Cinema Atmosphere" film distribution / Gate Film

Opening		Title	Russian title	Cast and crew	Details
O C T O B E R	5	Lord of the Wind	Повелитель ветра	Director: Igor Voloshin; Cast: Fyodor Bondarchuk, Anna Mikhalkova, Yevgeny Tkachuk, Andrey Burkovsky, Daniil Vorobyov	Central Partnership / Art Pictures Studio / Vodorod Pictures; The history of the 11-day round-the-world balloon flight that Fyodor Konyukhov made in 2016.
O C T O B E R	12	The Cage is Looking for a Bird	Клетка ищет птицу	Director: Malika Musaeva; Cast: Khadizha Bataeva, Madina Akkieva	"Pioner" film distribution / Alexander Sokurov's Fund / Hype Studios
O C T O B E R	12	KikoRiki are Making a Movie	Смешарики снимают кино	Director: Denis Chernov, Svetlana Mardagolimova, Dmitry Yakovenko	National Media Group film distribution / Riki Group; This cartoon is based on the animated series KikoRiki.
O C T O B E R	19	Matthew Passion	Страсти по Матвею	Director: Sergey Ilyin; Cast: Denis Vlasenko, Valeriia Zoidova, Timofey Tribuntsev, Aleksey Rozin, Olga Medynich	National Media Group film distribution / QS Films / START Studio / Yellow, Black and White; The romantic relationship between an altar boy and a society girl.
O C T O B E R	26	The Empresses	Императрицы	Director: Andrei Kravchuk; Cast: Yulia Peresild, Ivan Kolesnikov, Igor Gordin, Kseniya Utekihina, Anastasia Talyzina	Central Partnership / 1-2-3 Production; Sequel to the film Peter I: The Last Tsar and the First Emperor (2022).
O C T O B E R	26	Wish of the Fairy Fish	По щучьему велению	Director: Alexandr Voitinsky; Cast: Nikita Kologrivyy, Mila Ershova, Alina Alekseeva, Yuri Kolokolnikov, Roman Madyanov, Fyodor Lavrov, Agrippina Steklova	National Media Group film distribution / CTB Film Company / Studio Globus; Slavic peasant fairy tale based on the Russian folk tale At the Pike's Behest by Alexander Afanasyev.
N O V E M B E R	2	The Man from Nowhere	Человек ниоткуда	Director: Renat Davletyarov; Cast: Aleksandr Metyolkin, Varvara Komarova, Irina Medvedeva, Ilya Lyubimov, Ivan Zlobin	Nashe Kino (transl. "Our Cinema") / Interfest; The sci-fi thriller film begins in the 1960s; a Soviet spaceship has crashed, and an astronaut wakes up in Moscow in 2023.
N O V E M B E R	9	Year of Birth	Год рождения	Director: Mikhail Mestetsky; Cast: Eldar Kalimulin, Anastasia Talyzina, Yuri Borisov	VLG.FILM / Droog Drooga / Pinery / Kinoprime Foundation; A young dreamer is torn between family life and fantasies.
N O V E M B E R	9	Syndrome	Синдром	Director: Anton Bormatov; Cast: Oksana Akinshina, Kirill Käro, Alina Alekseyeva, Yevgenia Dobrovolskaya	The company Central Partnership took on the creation of a psychological thriller / Producer center "Gorad"
N O V E M B E R	16	The Legend of Sambo	Легенда о самбо	Director: Andrey Bogatyrev; Cast: Wolfgang Cerny, Dmitry Pavlenko, Anton Vohmin Aleksey Shevchenkov	ABS Film Company; A biography about the sporting clash between the greatest Soviet martial artists Viktor Spiridonov and Vasili Oshchepkov.
N O V E M B E R	23	The White List	Белый список	Director: Alisa Khazanova; Cast: Aleksei Serebryakov, Vladimir Averyanov, Evgeniya Kregzhde	
D E C E M B E R	4	Let’s Go to Macau With You	Поедем с тобой в Макао	Cast & Director: Roman Mikhaylov; Cast: Oleg Chugunov, Yuliya Marchenko, Roman Ageev	VLG.FILM / Fruit Time
D E C E M B E R	21	Bad Habit	Вредная привычка	Director: Mitry Semenov-Aleinikov; Cast: Yan Tsapnik, Anton Zhizhin, Aleksandra Solovyova	National Media Group film distribution A comedy film; a village father and son are getting used to the world of smoothies and Pilates.
D E C E M B E R	21	New Year’s All Inclusive	Новогодний ол инклюзив	Director: Oleg Asadulin; Cast: Yan Tsapnik, Alexandr Zlatopolsky	"Cinema Atmosphere" film distribution Two warring families find themselves under the same roof on New Year's Eve.
D E C E M B E R	28	Three Heroes and the Navel of the World	Три богатыря и Пуп Земли	Director: Konstantin Feoktistov	VLG.FILM / Melnitsa Animation Studio / CTB Film Company

=== Culturally Russian films ===
- The Palace, a 2023 drama film directed by Roman Polanski
- Tetris, a 2023 biographical film directed by Jon S. Baird

== See also ==
- List of Russian films
- List of Russian films of 2024
