= List of 2020 films based on actual events =

This is a list of films and miniseries released in 2020 that are based on actual events. All films on this list are from American production unless indicated otherwise.

== 2020 ==
- 2 Hearts (2020) – romantic drama film based on the true story of Leslie and Jorge Bacardi and Christopher Gregory
- 18 Presents (Italian: 18 regali) (2020) – Italian drama film based on an actual Italian woman, Elisa Girotto, who had planned and allocated 17 years of birthday gifts for her daughter Anna before her death in September 2017 due to a terminal breast cancer.
- Adam (2020) – biographical drama film about a hard-living salesman who becomes a quadriplegic after an accident, based on a true story
- Admitted (Hindi: स्वीकार किया) (2020) – Indian Hindi-language biographical drama film about Dhananjay Chauhan, the first transgender student at Panjab University
- AK-47 (Russian: Калашников) (2020) – Russian biographical film about the experiences of Mikhail Kalashnikov, inventor of the AK-47 assault rifle
- Alex Wheatle (2020) – historical drama television film about Alex Wheatle, a Black British novelist who was sentenced to a term of imprisonment after the 1981 Brixton uprising
- All My Life (2020) – romantic drama film based on the true story of Solomon Chau and Jennifer Carter, a young couple that rushes to put their wedding together after Solomon is diagnosed with liver cancer
- Ammonite (2020) – British-Australian romantic drama film based on the life of English fossil collector, dealer, and palaeontologist Mary Anning
- The Asadas (Japanese: 浅田家!) (2020) – Japanese biographical drama film based on the real-life photographer, Masashi Asada
- BAC Nord (2020) – French crime drama film based on a scandal that took place in 2012 within the anti-crime brigade (BAC) of Marseille: eighteen of its members had been referred to correctional for drug trafficking and racketeering
- The Bad Poet (Italian: Il bad poet) (2020) – Italian biographical drama film focusing on the last years of the poet Gabriele D'Annunzio and on his ambiguous relationship with fascism
- The Banker (2020) – drama film following Joe Morris and Bernard Garrett, two of the first African-American bankers in the United States who bought banks in Texas to give lending opportunities to blacks who aspired to own homes and start business, while Jim Crow laws made such ambitions nearly impossible in the Deep South in the 1950s
- Barbarians (German: Barbaren) (2020) – German historical war drama miniseries based on events during the Roman Empire's occupation of Germania, and the resulting rebellion of the Germanic tribes led by Arminius.
- Beans (2020) – Canadian drama film directed by Mohawk filmmaker Tracey Deer, telling the story of the Oka Crisis, which Deer experienced herself as a child, through the story of Tekehentahkhwa (nicknamed "Beans"), a young Mohawk girl whose perspective on life is radically changed by the events of the crisis
- The Best Is Yet to Come (Chinese: 不止不休) (2020) – Chinese drama film based on the real figure of journalist Han Fudong, who exposed the social stigma against hepatitis B-suffering people in China
- Betrayed (Norwegian: Den største forbrytelsen) (2020) – Norwegian sports drama film based on the true story of the Norwegian boxer Charles Braude and his family being persecuted, arrested and murdered by the Nazis during World War II with the collaboration of the Norwegian government as part of their operation to exterminate all Jews in Europe
- Betrayer (2020) – Czech historical drama television film about Emanuel Moravec
- Beyond That Mountain (Korean:저 산 너머) (2020) – South Korean biographical film about the childhood of Stephen Kim Sou-hwan, former Cardinal of the Roman Catholic Church and Archbishop of Seoul
- The Big Hit (French: Un triomphe) (2020) – French comedy drama film based on the experiences of Jan Jönson when he staged a theatre performance with prison inmates
- Blackjack: The Jackie Ryan Story (2020) – biographical sports drama film depicting the story of Brooklyn-based streetball player Jack Ryan
- Capone (2020) – biographical gangster film about the notorious gangster Al Capone
- Caught in Time (Chinese: 除暴) (2020) – Chinese-Hong Kong crime action film based on the robber and serial killer Zhang Jun
- Centigrade (2020) – survival thriller film based on the real-life case of Peter Skyllberg, a Swedish man who was pulled barely alive from his snow-covered car having survived on nothing but snow for two months in sub-zero temperatures
- The Champion (Polish: Mistrz) (2020) – Polish sports drama film about Tadeusz Pietrzykowski, a real-life Polish boxer who became famous for his nearly undefeated strings of victories in the Nazi concentration camps
- Charlatan (Czech: Šarlatán) (2020) – Czech-Polish-Irish-Slovak drama film based on the healer Jan Mikolášek, who cured hundreds of people using plant-based remedies
- Chhapaak (Hindi: छपाक) (2020) – Indian Hindi-language drama film based on the life of Laxmi Agarwal
- The Clark Sisters: First Ladies of Gospel (2020) – biographical film about Gospel group The Clark Sisters
- Clouds (2020) – biographical romantic musical drama teen film about the life of Zach Sobiech, a teenager from Minnesota who had osteosarcoma and decided to follow his dream of becoming a musician, after finding out he is dying
- The Comey Rule (2020) – political drama miniseries following FBI director James Comey in the run-up to the 2016 election, and later in the early months of Donald Trump's presidency
- The Courier (2020) – historical spy film about Greville Wynne, a British businessman who was recruited by the Secret Intelligence Service to deliver messages to secret agent Oleg Penkovsky during the Cuban Missile Crisis in the 1960s
- Coven (Basque: Akelarre) (2020) – Spanish historical drama film based on real events from the 17th-century Spanish Inquisition and the witch trials that occurred in the Basque region of Spain
- Critical Thinking (2020) – biographical drama film based on the true story of the 1998 Miami Jackson High School chess team
- Curveball (2020) – German political satire film based on true events leading up to the Iraq War of 2003
- Dance of the 41 (Spanish: El baile de los 41) (2020) – Mexican drama film portraying the events leading up to and around a 1901 party of gay men, half of whom were dressed in drag, known as the Dance of the Forty-One
- De Gaulle (2020) – French biographical historical drama film based on married couple, Charles de Gaulle and his wife Yvonne, during military and political collapse as the Battle of France rages
- Dear Comrades! (Russian: Дорогие товарищи!) (2020) – Russian historical drama film about the shooting of a demonstration of workers in Novocherkassk in 1962
- Des (2020) – British drama miniseries based on the 1983 arrest of Scottish serial killer Dennis Nilsen after the discovery of human remains causing the blockage of a drain near his home
- Doctor Liza (Russian: Доктор Лиза) (2020) – Russian biographical drama film about Elizabeth Glinka, a Russian humanitarian worker and charity activist
- Dream Horse (2020) – drama film about thoroughbred racehorse Dream Alliance who won the 2009 Welsh Grand National Race
- The Duke (2020) – British drama film based on the real-life theft of the Portrait of the Duke of Wellington
- The East (Dutch: De Oost) (2020) – Dutch war drama film set in the Dutch East Indies of 1946 during the Indonesian National Revolution
- Education (2020) – drama film based on real-life events of the 1970s, when some London councils followed an unofficial policy of transferring disproportionate numbers of black children from mainstream education to schools for the so-called "educationally subnormal"
- The Eight Hundred (Chinese: 八佰) (2020) – Chinese historical war drama film based on real life events: the defense of Sihang Warehouse in 1937 Shanghai by Chinese NRA troops during the Battle of Shanghai and the Second Sino-Japanese War
- Emperor (2020) – historical drama film based on the true story of Shields Green, an African American slave nicknamed "Emperor", who escaped to freedom and participated in abolitionist John Brown's raid on Harpers Ferry
- Enfant Terrible (2020) – German biographical drama film about the German film director Rainer Werner Fassbinder
- The English Game (2020) – British historical sport drama miniseries about the origins of modern association football in England
- Escape from Pretoria (2020) – Australian biographical prison thriller film based on the real-life prison escape by three young political prisoners from jail in South Africa in 1979
- Fatima (2020) – faith-based drama film based on the 1917 Our Lady of Fátima events
- The Forgotten Battle (Dutch: De Slag om de Schelde) (2020) – Dutch World War II film depicting the Battle of the Scheldt in 1944
- Forgotten We'll Be (Spanish: El olvido que seremos) (2020) – Colombian drama film based on the true story of Héctor Abad Gómez, a Colombian university professor who challenges the country's establishment.
- Four Good Days (2020) – drama film based upon Eli Saslow's 2016 Washington Post article "How's Amanda? A Story of Truth, Lies and an American Addiction"
- Fukushima 50 (Japanese: フクシマフィフティ) (2020) – Japanese drama film based on the Fukushima Daiichi nuclear disaster which was caused by the 2011 Tōhoku earthquake and tsunami
- The Glorias (2020) – biographical drama film about American activist and journalist Gloria Steinem
- The Good Traitor (Danish: Vores mand i Amerika) (2020) – Danish historical drama film about Henrik Kauffmann and the signing of the Greenland treaty with the United States after the Nazi occupation of Denmark during World War II
- Grant (2020) – historical drama miniseries chronicling the life of Ulysses S. Grant, the eighteenth President of the United States
- The Great (2020) – comedy miniseries loosely based on the rise of Catherine the Great, Empress of Russia
- Gul Makai (Hindi: गुल मकई) (2020) – Indian Hindi-language biographical drama film based on the life of Malala Yousafzai, a Pakistani activist for female education and the youngest Nobel Prize laureate
- Gunjan Saxena: The Kargil Girl (Hindi: गुंजन सक्सेना) (2020) – Indian Hindi-language biographical drama film about Indian Air Force pilot Gunjan Saxena, one of the first Indian female air-force pilots in combat
- Hamilton – historical fiction musical drama film covering the life of American Founding Father Alexander Hamilton and his involvement in the American Revolution and the political history of the early United States
- Hammamet (2020) – Italian biographical drama film based on the last years of life of Bettino Craxi, a controversial Italian politician who was the Secretary of the Italian Socialist Party, served as Prime Minister during the 1980s and later fled to Tunisia to avoid legal prosecution on corruption charges during the Mani Pulite scandal
- Havel (2020) – Czech historical film based on the life of dissident and former Czech president Václav Havel
- The Heist of the Century (Spanish: El robo del siglo) (2020) – Argentine comedy thriller film based on the robbery of the Banco Río branch in the Buenos Aires town of Acassuso on 13 January 2006, which was attacked by a gang of six robbers armed with toy weapons
- Hidden Away (Italian: Volevo nascondermi) (2020) – Italian biographical drama film about Italian painter Antonio Ligabue, who lived a notoriously reclusive life, troubled with physical problems and mental illness
- Hillbilly Elegy (2020) – drama film about the Appalachian values of Vice President-elect JD Vance's family from Kentucky and the socioeconomic problems of his hometown of Middletown, Ohio, where his mother's parents moved when they were young
- Honour (2020) – British drama miniseries depicting the investigation into the real-life disappearance and murder of honour killing victim Banaz Mahmod
- I Carry You with Me (Spanish: Te Llevo Conmigo) (2020) – Mexican romantic drama film based on the true story of an aspiring chef and a teacher and the societal pressures they faced
- I Still Believe (2020) – religious biographical drama film based on the life of singer-songwriter Jeremy Camp and his first wife, Melissa Lynn Henning-Camp, who was diagnosed with ovarian cancer shortly before they married
- I Was Lorena Bobbitt (2020) – biographical drama film about John and Lorena Bobbitt, a Virginia couple whose troubled marriage became international news in 1993 when Lorena cut off her husband's penis with a knife
- The Investigation (Danish: Efterforskningen) (2020) – Danish crime drama miniseries based on the investigation of the death of Kim Wall, a 30-year-old Swedish journalist
- Joe Bell (2020) – biographical road drama film following the true story of a father and his gay son who set out to bond while walking across the country
- Josep (2020) – French-Belgian-Spanish animated biographical film detailing the life of Catalonian cartoonist and revolutionary Josep Bartolí, following his experience during the Spanish Civil War, after the Second World War and his relationship with the Mexican painter Frida Kahlo
- Kupała (Belarusian: Купала) (2020) – Belarusian biographical drama film dramatizing the turbulent and tragic life of Belarusian poet Yanka Kupala
- Lata Bhagwan Kare (Marathi: लता भगवान करे) (2020) – Indian Marathi-language biographical drama film based on the life of Lata Bhagwan Kare, who participated in a marathon at the age of 65 for her husband's medical treatment
- Leap (Chinese: 夺冠) (2020) – Chinese biographical sports film based on the China women's national volleyball team's stories spread over more than 40 years
- The Liberator (2020) – adult animated war drama miniseries about World War II where maverick U.S. Army officer Felix Sparks and the 157th Infantry Regiment fought for over five hundred days alongside the Allied forces during the Italian campaign
- Lost Girls (2020) – drama mystery film based on the life of American activist and murder victim advocate Mari Gilbert, a woman tirelessly looking for her missing daughter Shannan, during her search, police found 10 other bodies across Long Island during the Long Island killings
- Louis van Beethoven (2020) – German-Czech-Austrian biographical drama film telling the story of the world-famous composer (Ludwig van Beethoven) from different perspectives
- Ma Rainey's Black Bottom (2020) – biographical drama film focusing on Ma Rainey, an influential blues singer, and dramatizing a turbulent recording session in 1920s Chicago
- Main Khudiram Bose Hun (Hindi: मैं खुदीराम बोस हूं) (2020) – Indian Hindi-language biographical drama film about Indian revolutionary leader Khudiram Bose from West Bengal
- The Man Standing Next (Korean: 남산의 부장들) (2020) – South Korean political drama film telling the story of the high-ranking officials of the Korean government and the Korean Central Intelligence Agency (KCIA) during the presidency of Park Chung Hee 40 days before his assassination in 1979
- Mank (2020) – biographical drama film about screenwriter Herman J. Mankiewicz, and his battles with director Orson Welles over screenplay credit for Citizen Kane (1941)
- The Marijuana Conspiracy (2020) – Canadian drama film based on a group of young women in 1972, who were confined to a hospital for 98 days and made to smoke marijuana daily as part of a medical research study into the effects of cannabis on women
- Memories of My Father (Spanish: El olvido que seremos) (2020) – Colombian drama film about Héctor Abad Gómez, a university professor who fought against oppression and social inequality in Colombia in the seventies
- Minamata (2020) – biographical drama film about W. Eugene Smith, an American photojournalist who documented the effects of mercury poisoning on the citizens of Minamata, Kumamoto, Japan
- Misbehaviour (2020) – British comedy drama film about Jennifer Hosten, the first black competitor in the 1970 Miss World competition
- Miss Marx (2020) – Italian-Belgian historical biographical drama film about the life of Eleanor Marx
- The Mother Eagle (French: Le Sang du pélican) (2020) – Canadian French-language biographical drama film about the life of Marie of the Incarnation, an Ursuline nun in New France who was instrumental in the founding of the historically significant Ursuline monastery in Montreal
- Mrs. America (2020) – historical drama miniseries depicting the unsuccessful political movement to pass the Equal Rights Amendment and the unexpected backlash led by conservative activist Phyllis Schlafly in the 1970s
- My Left Nut (2020) – Northern Irish comedy drama miniseries drawing heavily on Michael Patrick's own teenage years, following a 15-year old as he discovers a swelling on his left testicle
- The One and Only Ivan (2020) – fantasy drama film inspired by the true story of Ivan the gorilla
- One Breath (Russian: Один вдох) (2020) – Russian biographical sport drama film based on the life of world freediving champion Natalia Molchanova, who founded the first internationally recognized national school of freediving (Freediving Federation) with her colleagues in Russia, has authored her own method of teaching freediving, books and films on freediving
- One Night in Miami... (2020) – drama film depicting a fictionalized account of a real February 1964 meeting of Malcolm X, Muhammad Ali, Jim Brown, and Sam Cooke in a room at the Hampton House, celebrating Ali's surprise title win over Sonny Liston
- Operation Buffalo (2020) – Australian comedy drama miniseries inspired by true events of British nuclear bomb tests in the 1950s at remote Maralinga, in outback South Australia, specifically the four tests codenamed Operation Buffalo
- Operation Christmas Drop (2020) – Christmas romantic comedy film loosely based on the real-life U.S. Air Force Operation Christmas Drop humanitarian mission
- The Outpost (2020) – war film about the Battle of Kamdesh in the War in Afghanistan
- Pardon? Alberto Sordi (Italian: Permette? Alberto Sordi) (2020) – Italian historical biographical film narrating the twenty years of Alberto Sordi's life, from 1937 to 1957, from his beginnings to his celebrity, retracing his friendships, loves and his career
- Penguin Bloom (2020) – Australian-American drama film based on the book of the same name about the struggling Bloom family in the aftermath of an accident which left Sam Bloom with partial paralysis
- Percy (2020) – Canadian-American-Indian biographical drama film about 70-year-old small-town Saskatchewan farmer Percy Schmeiser, who takes on a giant corporation after their GMOs interfere with his crops
- Quiz (2020) – British crime drama miniseries focusing on Charles Ingram, a former army major in the Royal Engineers, and how he unexpectedly won the £1,000,000 jackpot on the quiz show Who Wants to Be a Millionaire? in 2001, followed by a criminal trial in which he and his wife were convicted of cheating their way to success.
- Quo Vadis, Aida? (2020) – Bosnian war drama film dramatizing the events of the Srebrenica massacre, during which Serbian troops sent Bosniak men and boys to death in July 1995 led by Serbian convicted war criminal Ratko Mladić
- Resistance (2020) – biographical drama film based on the life of French actor and mime artist Marcel Marceau
- The Right Stuff (2020) – historical drama miniseries exploring the origins and growth of the United States' space program
- Rise of Empires: Ottoman (Turkish: Ottoman: Mehmet ve Vlad Karşı Karşıya) (2020) – Turkish historical drama miniseries based on the Ottoman Empire and Mehmed the Conqueror and telling the story of the Fall of Constantinople
- Roald & Beatrix: The Tail of the Curious Mouse (2020) – drama television film inspired by the true story of a six-year-old Roald Dahl meeting his idol Beatrix Potter
- Roe V. Wade (2020) – political legal drama film that serves as a dramatization of the 1973 landmark decision of the same name, rendered by the U.S. Supreme Court on the issue of the constitutionality of laws that criminalized or restricted access to abortions
- Rose Island (Italian: L'incredibile storia dell'Isola delle Rose) (2020) – Italian comedy drama film based on the true story of engineer Giorgio Rosa and the Republic of Rose Island
- Safety (2020) – biographical sports drama family film based on the story of Ray McElrathbey, a football player who battled family adversity to join the Clemson Tigers
- The Salisbury Poisonings (2020) – British biographical drama miniseries which portrays the 2018 Novichok poisonings and decontamination crisis in Salisbury, England, and the subsequent Amesbury poisonings
- Scam 1992 (2020) – Indian Hindi-language biographical financial thriller miniseries based on the 1992 Indian stock market scam committed by many stockbrokers including Harshad Mehta
- Self Made (2020) – biographical drama miniseries portraying a fictionalized depiction of "the untold story of black hair care pioneer and mogul Madam C. J. Walker and how she overcame the hostilities of turn-of-the-century America, epic rivalries, and tumultuous marriages to become America's first Black, self-made female millionaire
- Sergio (2020) – biographical drama film about United Nations diplomat Sérgio Vieira de Mallo
- Shakeela (Hindi: शकीला) (2020) – Indian Hindi-language biographical drama film about the eponymous adult star of the 1990s who acted in adult films in several Indian languages
- Shakuntala Devi (Hindi: शकुन्तला देवी) (2020) – Indian Hindi-language biographical drama film tracing the life of mathematician Shakuntala Devi, who was also known as the "human computer"
- Shirley (2020) – biographical drama film about novelist Shirley Jackson's life during the time period she was writing her 1951 novel Hangsaman
- Sitting in Limbo (2020) – drama television film about the Windrush scandal focusing on the real-life experiences of a Jamaican-born British man, Anthony Bryan, one of the victims of the UK Home Office hostile environment policy on immigration
- Son of the South (2020) – biographical historical drama film, based on Bob Zellner's autobiography, The Wrong Side of Murder Creek: A White Southerner in the Freedom Movement
- Stardust (2020) – British-Canadian biographical drama film about English singer-songwriter David Bowie and his alter-ego Ziggy Stardust
- Street Survivors: The True Story of the Lynyrd Skynyrd Plane Crash (2020) – musical survival drama film about the rock band Lynyrd Skynyrd, whose plane crashed on 20 October 1977, killing three band members and the two pilots, while the tour plane ran out of fuel over Mississippi
- Streltsov (Russian: Стрельцов) (2020) – Russian biographical sport drama film about the Soviet footballer, Eduard Streltsov, and his difficult path to national fame
- Suarez: The Healing Priest (2020) – Philippine biographical film depicting the life of Filipino priest and faith healer Fernando Suarez
- Tanhaji (Hindi: तानाजी) (2020) – Indian Hindi-language biographical historical action film revolving around the life of Tanhaji Malusare, depicting his attempts to recapture the Kondhana fortress once it passes on to Mughal emperor Aurangzeb who transfers its control to his trusted guard Udaybhan Singh Rathore
- Tesla (2020) – biographical drama film about Serbian-American inventor, electrical engineer, mechanical engineer and futurist Nikola Tesla
- Tigers (2020) – Swedish-Italian sports drama film depicting the true story of teenage football talent Martin Bengtsson's life-and-death journey through a modern-day football industry where everything, and everyone, has a price tag
- Tiny Tim: King for a Day (Swedish: Tiny Tim: Kung för en dag) (2020) – Swedish biographical film about musician Tiny Tim
- Tove (2020) – Finnish biographical film about Swedo-Finnish author and illustrator Tove Jansson
- The Trial of the Chicago 7 (2020) – crime drama film based on the story of the Chicago Seven, a group of seven defendants charged by the federal government with conspiracy, inciting to riot, and other charges related to anti-Vietnam War and countercultural protests that took place in Chicago, Illinois, on the occasion of the 1968 Democratic National Convention
- Walnut Tree (Persian: درخت گردو) (2020) – Iranian biographical war drama film revolving around the Chemical bombing of Sardasht of 1987
- Washington (2020) – war drama miniseries chronicling the life of George Washington, the first President of the United States
- White House Farm (2020) – British crime drama miniseries based on the real-life events that took place in August 1985
- White Snow (Russian: Белый снег) (2020) – Russian biographical sport drama film based on events that happened at the 1997 FIS Cross-Country World Cup
- The Windermere Children (2020) – biographical drama film based on the experience of child survivors of the Holocaust, it follows the children and staff of a camp set up on the Calgarth Estate in Troutbeck Bridge, near Lake Windermere, England, where the survivors were helped to rehabilitate, rebuild their lives, and integrate into the British society
- Worth (2020) – biographical film depicting Kenneth Feinberg's handling of the September 11th Victim Compensation Fund
