= Catherine the Great (2025 film) =

- Directed by: Morad Abdel-Fattakh
- Written by: Andrei Kravchuk; Anton Cherenkov; Andrey Rubanov; Aleksey Miller; Ivan Zavaruev
- Produced by: Tina Kandelaki; Ivan Golomovzyuk; Aleksandr Zharov; Boris Khanchalyan; Vadim Vereshchagin; Vladimir Shaposhnikov; Marina Razumova; Elena Torchinskaya; Lyubov Grebenkina; Anton Kiselev; Pyotr Shakhlevich; Elena Shabunina
- Starring: Olga Lerman; Anna Mikhalkova; Nina Kucheruk
- Cinematography: Morad Abdel-Fattakh
- Edited by: Aleksandr Koshelev
- Music by: Vasily Teterin
- Production company: 1-2-3 Production
- Distributed by: Central Partnership
- Release date: February 20, 2025 (Russia)
- Running time: 112 minutes
- Country: Russia
- Language: Russian

Catherine the Great (Russian: Екатерина Великая) is a 2025 Russian historical documentary film directed by Morad Abdel-Fattakh about the reign of one of Russia's most celebrated empresses, Catherine II; the third film in the Rus' franchise. The role of Catherine II was played by three actresses: Anna Mikhalkova, Olga Lerman and Nina Kucheruk.

It was released on February 20, 2025, by Central Partnership.

== Plot ==
The era of palace coups had ended, and Catherine II emerged as a prominent historical figure. Rather than remaining solely the emperor's wife, she became ruler of Russia and promoted ideas associated with the Enlightenment.

== Cast ==
- Anna Mikhalkova as an adult Catherine II
  - Olga Lerman as Catherine II
  - Nina Kucheruk as a young Catherine II
- Viktor Dobronravov as Alexey Orlov
- Kirill Kuznetsov as Grigory Orlov
- Yevgeny Shvarts
- Yevgeny Kharitonov as Potemkin
- Konstantin Kryukov as Bibikov

== Production ==
Filming took place in Saint Petersburg.

== Sequel ==
Catherine the Great will be a direct sequel to the documentaries Peter I: The Last Tsar and the First Emperor (2022 film) and The Empresses (2023 film).
