= Bearer of the Sword =

Bearer of the Sword can refer to:

- Abu Sayyaf, an Islamist separatist group based in and around the southern Philippines
- An office at the coronation of English Kings and Queens
- Bearer of the sword (Hungary), an office at the coronation of the Hungarian monarch
- Miecznik, an office in the Kingdom of Poland and after Union of Lublin in Polish-Lithuanian Commonwealth

== See also ==
- The Sword Bearer, 2006 Russian action film
- Swordbearer (disambiguation)
