= Jumpman =

Jumpman may refer to:

== Sports ==
- Jumpman (logo), based on a silhouette of Michael Jordan and first used on Nike's Air Jordan shoes

== Arts and media ==
- "Jumpman" (song), by Drake and Future
- Jumpman (film), 2018 Russian film
- Jumpman (video game), an early platform game written by Randy Glover and released by Epyx in 1983
- Jumpman, the original name of the Nintendo character Mario in the 1981 game Donkey Kong
