= Peter I: The Last Tsar and the First Emperor =

- Movie poster
- Directed by: Andrei Kravchuk
- Written by: Anton Cherenkov; Andrei Kravchuk; Andrey Rubanov
- Produced by: Ivan Golomovzyuk; Lili Shiroziya; Pyotr Shakhlevich
- Starring: Ivan Kolesnikov; Aleksei Lukin; Daniil Muravyov Izotov; Wolfgang Cerny; Maksim Ivanov; Kseniya Utekihina; Anastasiya Mishina; Yuliya Bocharova
- Cinematography: Morad Abdel Fattakh
- Edited by: Ekaterina Pivneva
- Music by: Kuzma Bodrov
- Production company: 1-2-3 Production
- Distributed by: Central Partnership
- Release date: November 3, 2022 (Russia)
- Running time: 112 minutes
- Country: Russia
- Language: Russian

Peter I: The Last Tsar and the First Emperor (Russian: Пётр I: Последний царь и первый император, romanized: Pyotr I: Poslednyy tsar i pervyy imperator) is a 2022 Russian historical documentary film directed by Andrei Kravchuk about the fate of one of the brightest Russian rulers, who forever rewrote the history of the country.

It was released on November 3, 2022, by Central Partnership.

== Plot ==
A large-scale reconstruction project about events in Russia in the 17th and 18th centuries, telling about the transformation of Ancient Rus' into the Russian Empire and the construction of a state that became the foundation for modern Russia. The film tells the story of the formation and reign of Peter the Great, the fourteenth child in the family, who took the throne, won access to the sea in the absence of a professional army and navy, and over the course of several decades brought a country that no one reckoned with into world leadership.

== Cast ==
- Ivan Kolesnikov as Tsar and Emperor Peter I (the Great), Emperor of All Russia
  - Aleksei Lukin as Peter I in his youth
  - Daniil Muravyev-Izotov as Peter I in childhood
- Wolfgang Cerny as François Le Fort, advisor to Peter I
- Igor Gordin as Menshikov
  - Maksim Ivanov as Menshikov in his youth
- Kseniya Utekihina as Catherine I of Russia, Empress of All Russia
- Anastasiya Mishina as Sophia Alekseyevna of Russia, Peter I's elder sister
- Ivan Dobronravov as Alexei Petrovich, Peter I's son
- Yuliya Bocharova as Natalya Naryshkina
- Roman Konoplev as Ivan Alekseyevich
- Aleksandr Bolshakov as Patriarch Joachim of Moscow
- Aleksandr Klyukvin as Fyodor Romodanovsky
- Ivan Stepanov as Mikhail Mikhailovich Golitsyn
- Aleksandr Vysokovsky as Ivan Tsykler
- Valentin Stasyuk as Aleksei Shein
- Vasily Michkov as Artamon Matveyev

== Release ==
The premiere of the tape is scheduled for November 3, 2022. The release of the project is dedicated to the 350th anniversary of Peter the Great. The film can be seen in Russian cinemas.

== Sequel ==
- The Empresses (2023 film)
- Catherine the Great (2025 film)
