= Swordbearer =

Swordbearer may refer to

- Livonian Brothers of the Sword, also called Christ Knights, Sword Brethren, and The Militia of Christ of Livonia
- The Swordbearer, a 1982 fantasy novel by Glen Cook
- The Sword Bearer, a 2006 Russian action film
- Swordbearer (ceremonial), civic official
- Swordbearer (role-playing game), published by Heritage Games in 1982 and Fantasy Games Unlimited in 1985

== See also ==
- Swordsman
- The Sword Bearer, 2006 Russian action film
- Bearer of the Sword (disambiguation)
