= Rodnina (film) =

- Directed by: Konstantin Statsky
- Written by: Svetlana Dali; Anna Ozar; Irina Rodnina; Anna Trefts
- Based on: The Tear of a Champion by Irina Rodnina
- Produced by: Timur Vaynshteyn; Yuliya Sumachyova; Anton Zlatopolsky; Mikhail Pogosov; Yevgeny Mishiev; Ksenia Sokolova; Alina Borisova; Nonna Aristarkhova
- Starring: Vladislava Samokhina; Ivan Kolesnikov; Yevgeny Tkachuk; Fedor Fedotov; Daniil Vorobyov; Marat Basharov; Igor Petrenko; Maria Mironova
- Cinematography: Vyacheslav Lisnevsky
- Edited by: Maria Sergeenkova; Oleg Goncharenko
- Music by: Pavel Yesenin
- Production companies: WeiT Media; Gold Media Production; Russia-1; ivi.ru; R1 Film Company; Cinema Fund
- Distributed by: Central Partnership
- Release date: March 6, 2025 (Russia)
- Running time: 134 minutes
- Country: Russia
- Language: Russian
- Budget: ₽425 million

Rodnina (Russian: Роднина) is a 2025 Russian biographical sports drama film directed by Konstantin Statskiy. The film is based on Irina Rodnina's autobiographical memoirs "The Tear of a Champion", published in 2013. The strong cast was joined by Vladislava Samokhina, Ivan Kolesnikov, Yevgeny Tkachuk, Fedor Fedotov, Daniil Vorobyov, and many others.

This film was theatrically released on March 6, 2025, by Central Partnership.

== Plot ==
Ill Ira, at her parents' insistence, began figure skating to gain strength, but she discovered her calling in the sport. She enrolled in the CSKA figure skating school and discovered incredible fortitude and a thirst for victory. She won a series of championships, and now she wants to change the perception of figure skating...

== Cast ==
- Vladislava Samokhina as Irina Rodnina
- Ivan Kolesnikov as Alexander Zaitsev, pair skater
- Yevgeny Tkachuk as Stanislav Zhukov, а coach (the prototype is Stanislav Zhuk)
- Fedor Fedotov as Mikhail Bulanov (the prototype is Alexei Ulanov)
- Daniil Vorobyov as Alexei Pankratov (the prototype is Oleg Protopopov)
- Kristina Stepanova as Elena Belova (the prototype is Lyudmila Belousova)
- Olga Bodrova as Natalia, a coach (the prototype is Tatiana Tarasova)
- Marat Basharov as Albert Lisov
- Igor Petrenko as Konstantin, Rodnina's father
- Maria Mironova as Bulanov's mother
- Aleksandr Semchev as Vasily
- Alexei Yagudin as John Nix, Babilonia and Gardner's trainer
- Anastasia Ignatyeva as Tai Babilonia
- Andrey Mirin as Randy Gardner
- Stasya Miloslavskaya as Nadezhda Lyubimova
- Aleksei Maklakov as Pavel Borisov

== Production ==
=== Casting ===
For artistic purposes, some of the surnames of real people from the world of sports have been changed. So the legendary coach Stanislav Zhuk became Zhukov, Alexey Ulanov, paired with whom Irina Rodnina won Olympic gold in 1972 in Sapporo, turned into Mikhail Bulanov, and the rivals of the Rodnina-Ulanov sports pair Lyudmila Belousova and Oleg Protopopov, according to the will of the screenwriters, began to receive the names Belova and Pankratov.

Olympic champion Alexei Yagudin plays a cameo role as American coach John Nix, who helped the pair of Tai Babilonia and Randy Gardner win the 1979 World Championships and become favorites for the 1980 Olympic Games in Lake Placid, but withdrew from the competition after suffering an injury during warm-up.

=== Filming ===
Filming took place in Moscow, Yekaterinburg, and Pervouralsk.
