= Gagarin: First in Space =

2013 Russian biopic

- English release film poster
- Directed by: Pavel Parkhomenko
- Written by: Andrey Dmitriev; Oleg Kapanets
- Based on: Vostok 1
- Produced by: Andrey Dmitriev; Oleg Kapanets
- Starring: Yaroslav Zhalnin; Mikhail Filippov; Olga Ivanova; Vadim Michman; Vladimir Steklov; Nadezhda Markina; Daniil Vorobyov; Inga Strelkova-Oboldina
- Cinematography: Anton Antonov
- Edited by: Anthony Waller; Marat Magambetov; Maria Manenkova
- Music by: George Kallis
- Production company: Kremlin Films
- Distributed by: Central Partnership (Russia 2013); Entertainment One (UK (2014))
- Release date: 6 June 2013 (Russia (theatrical))
- Running time: 108 minutes
- Country: Russia
- Languages: Russian (with other-languages subtitled)
- Budget: $9.5 million (estimated)

Gagarin: First in Space a.k.a.. First man In Space (Russian: Гагарин. Первый в космосе, romanized: Gagarin. Pervyy v kosmose) is a 2013 Russian docudrama biopic about the first man in space, Yuri Gagarin, and the 1961 mission of Vostok 1. It was released by Central Partnership theatrically in Russia on June 6, 2013, and in the United Kingdom on DVD on June 23, 2014 by Entertainment One. The film's running time of 108 minutes approximates the time it took Gagarin to go around the Earth before returning. It stars Yaroslav Zhalnin as Soviet fighter pilot and cosmonaut, Yuri Gagarin. The film received mixed reviews, with some critics praising the film's acting, direction and storytelling with others touching on the film's "cheap-looking" visual effects. The film received criticism for its state funding and ignoring the aftermath of the flight.

== Plot ==
On April 12 1961, Soviet cosmonaut Yuri Gagarin blasted off in a Vostok rocket, becoming the first human in space and orbiting Earth for 108 minutes. He was one of the first group of cosmonauts who were selected from over three thousand fighter pilots throughout the Soviet Union.

The top twenty who were selected were the ace of aces and none of the pilots knew which of them would make history on the first crewed flight. Once chosen Gagarin is fast-tracked to train for the unknown.

Whilst strapped into his rocket, Gagarin reflects on his life, which is intercut with the determination of the Russian space team and their untiring efforts to send a man into space.

== Cast ==
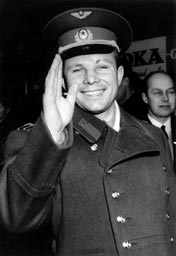
The real Yuri Gagarin, played in the film by Yaroslav Zhalin.

- Yaroslav Zhalnin as Yuri Gagarin
  - Maksim Saprykin as 6-year-old Yuri Gagarin
  - Kristofer Yakovtsev as 14-year-old Yuri Gagarin
- Mikhail Filippov as Sergey Korolev
- Olga Ivanova as Valentina Ivanova
- Vadim Michman as German Titov
- Vladimir Steklov as Nikolai Kamanin
- Viktor Proskurin as Yuri's father
- Nadezhda Markina as Yuri's mother
- Daniil Vorobyov as Grigory Nelyubov
- Inga Strelkova-Oboldina as Adilya Kotovskaya
- Sergey Tezov as Colonel Karpov
- Anatoliy Otradnov as Andrian Nikolaev
- Vladimir Chuprikov as Nikita Khrushchev
- Sergey Laktyunkin as Valeriy Bykovsky
- Anatoliy Gushchin as Alexei Leonov
- Dmitriy Tikhonov as Konstantin Feoktistov
- Sergey Kalashnikov as Pavel Popovich
- Olga Kuzmina as Marina Popovich
- Anzor Kamariddinov as Mars Rafikov
- Sergey Kagakov as Oleg Ivanovsky
- Nina Esina as Zoya
- Olga Yakovtseva as Tanya
- Danila Bukrin as Boriska
- Vadim Golishnikov as Boris Rauschenbach

== Release ==
The film was released on DVD and Digital Download on June 23 2014 by Entertainment One.

== Reception ==
The film ignored the rest of Gagarin's life, Daily Telegraph reviewer Martin Chilton said, and his death, for which there are many conspiracy theories. He noted other criticisms of the film as "sanitized", reporting that Gagarin's family supported the film, after having taken legal action against two previous depictions of Gagarin, in a musical and a fictional drama.
