= List of 2020s films based on actual events =

This is an index of lists of films and miniseries released in the 2020s that are based on actual events.

- List of 2020 films based on actual events
- List of 2021 films based on actual events
- List of 2022 films based on actual events
- List of 2023 films based on actual events
- List of 2024 films based on actual events
- List of 2025 films based on actual events
- List of 2026 films based on actual events
