= The Italian (2005 film) =

2005 film

- English-language poster
- Directed by: Andrei Kravchuk
- Written by: Andrei Romanov
- Produced by: Andrei Zertsalov
- Starring: Kolya Spiridonov; Mariya Kuznetsova; Nikolai Reutov
- Cinematography: Aleksandr Burov
- Edited by: Tamara Lipartiya
- Music by: Alexander Knaifel
- Distributed by: Sony Pictures Classics (US)
- Release date: September 22, 2005
- Running time: 98 minutes
- Country: Russia
- Language: Russian

The Italian (Russian: Итальянец, translit. Italyanets) is a 2005 Russian drama film directed by Andrei Kravchuk. The screenplay by Andrei Romanov, inspired by a true story, focuses on a young boy's determined search for his mother. The film won the Grand Prix of the Deutsches Kinderhilfswerk from the International Jury at the 55th Berlin International Film Festival, and a Special Mention from their Children's Jury and was also selected as the Russian entry for the Best Foreign Language Film at the 78th Academy Awards, but it did not make the final shortlist. It received generally positive reviews from critics.

== Plot ==
Six-year-old Vanya Solntsev lives in a desolate and rundown orphanage run by an alcoholic headmaster. When a wealthy Italian couple wanting to adopt selects him, the other children, especially his good friend, Anton, envy his fortune and name him The Italian. However, when a grief-stricken mother of another boy commits suicide after returning to reclaim her son and discovering he is no longer there, Vanya fears the same fate looms for him. With the aid of some of the older boys, he retrieves his file from the office safe and learns the address of the children's home where he previously lived. Certain the records there will identify his mother, he sets off on his quest with the help of an older girl.

Pursuing him by car as he travels by train is the corrupt go-between, who brokered his remunerative adoption, and her driver, Grisha. Upon arriving in the town where the children's home is located, Vanya is attacked by the homeless boys, but escapes and finds a bus that will take him to his destination. There he is confronted by Grisha but manages to elude him and make contact with the night watchman of the home, who gives him his mother's address. Once again Grisha catches up with him, but when he realizes how determined Vanya is, lets him go. The boy is reunited with his mother. Through a letter Vanya wrote to Anton, who was adopted by the Italian couple instead, we learn Vanya is happy to be living with his mother in Russia.

== Cast ==
- Kolya Spiridonov as Vanya Solntsev
- Mariya Kuznetsova as Madam
- Nikolai Reutov as Grisha
- Yuri Itskov as Headmaster
- Dima Zemlyanko as Anton

== Production ==
Residents of the Lesogorsky Orphanage in Leningrad were cast as orphans in the film.

The film premiered at the Berlin International Film Festival and was shown at the Taipei Film Festival and the Buster Children's Film Festival in Denmark before going into theatrical release in Russia. It was shown at the Telluride Film Festival, the Toronto International Film Festival, the Morelia Film Festival in Mexico and the Paris Mon Premier Festival joden before going into limited release in the United States.

== Reception ==
=== Critical response ===
Based on 92 reviews collected by Rotten Tomatoes, The Italian has an overall approval rating from critics of 91%, with an average score of 7.3/10. The website's critical consensus states,"Poignant and unforgettable, The Italian stands out from other European melodramas. Like its extraordinary child lead, this Russian drama about an orphan's search for his birth mother is small in size and monumental in pathos". On Metacritic, the film has a weighted average score of 74 out of 100, based on 25 critics, indicating "generally favorable reviews"

Manohla Dargis of The New York Times said, "The film’s director, Mr. Kravchuk, throws a beautiful, somewhat gauzy light over this world that gently softens its harder angles. There is something slightly magical about the lighting, almost as if this were a fantasy land from which Vanya might actually make an escape. This sense of unreality, of magical thinking and wishing, carries the story and Vanya through a remarkable journey . . . like something out of a film by Roberto Rossellini, which is very high praise indeed."

Ruthe Stein of the San Francisco Chronicle called the film "a deeply moving experience, alternately funny and sad" and added, "Based on a real incident, it has the ring of truth. Every detail feels right, from the chill of a Russian winter to the coldness displayed by adults profiting from a trade in orphans."

Leslie Felperin of Variety observed, "Briskly helmed by feature debutant Andrei Kravchuk, [the picture] depicts the hard-knock life in a remote Russian children's home with stark realism, evolving smoothly into a taut adventure tale as [the protagonist] hits the road in search of his mom. Possibly a bit too hard-hitting for more protected Western kids, [the picture] might appeal to subtitle-friendly tweens and teens in upmarket territories."

=== Awards and nominations ===
The film won the Grand Prix of the Deutsches Kinderhilfswerk from the International Jury at the 2005 Berlin International Film Festival, and a Special Mention from their Children's Jury. It also won Golden Poznan Goats award for best feature movie at 23rd Ale Kino! Festival. Andrei Kravchuk won the CIFEJ Prize, awarded to the director of films especially designed for children or suitable for them, at the 2005 Carrousel International du Film in Montreal; the Cinekid Film Award at the 2005 Cinekid in Amsterdam; and the Grand Prix at the 2005 Honfleur Festival of Russian Cinema in France.

The film was Russia's submission for consideration in the category Academy Award for Best Foreign Language Film at the 78th Annual Academy Awards.

== See also ==
- International adoption
