= Nadezhda Markina =

Russian actress

- Надежда Маркина
- Born: Nadezhda Konstantinovna Markina; 29 January 1959 (age 67); Dmitriyevka, Nikiforovsky District, Tambov Oblast, RSFSR, USSR
- Occupation: Actress
- Years active: 1983-present
- Awards: Nika Award - 2011; Golden Mask

Nadezhda Konstantinovna Markina (Russian: Наде́жда Константиновна Маркина; born 29 January 1959) is a Soviet and Russian actress. She was nominated for the Best Performance by an Actress at the European Film Awards, the Asia Pacific Screen Awards, and the IFFI Best Actor Award (Female): Silver Peacock Award at the 42nd International Film Festival of India for the film Elena (2011).

== Selected filmography ==
- How Dark the Nights Are on the Black Sea as Sonya (1989)
- The Wedding as Valka (2000)
- Moscow Saga as episode (2004)
- The Sword Bearer as Sasha's mother (2006)
- Elena as Elena (2011)
- In the Fog as Burov's mother (2012)
- Gagarin: First in Space as Yuri's mother (2013)
- Ottepel as Olga Filippovna (2013)
- The White Crow as bureaucrat (2018)
- White Snow as Militsa (2020)
- Passengers as Nadezhda (2020)
