= Nachalnik razvedki =

- Genre: Drama
- Written by: Artem Chashchikhin-Toidze; Igor Ter-Karapetov; Alexander Shcherbakov
- Directed by: Kirill Belevich
- Starring: Sergey Marin; Igor Petrenko; Ivan Dobronravov; Ekaterina Vilkova; Artyom Tkachenko; Egor Beroev
- Composer: Roman Dormidoshin
- No. of seasons: 1

Production
- Producers: Artem Chashchikhin-Toidze; Sergey Titinkov; Yaroslav Generalov
- Cinematography: Andrey Naydenov

Nachalnik razvedki (Russian: Начальник разведки) is a 2022 Russian drama television series directed by Kirill Belevich. It stars Sergey Marin and Igor Petrenko.

== Plot ==
The series tells the story of the head of Soviet foreign intelligence, Pavel Mikhailovich Fitin, who, despite the horrors of war, poverty, and hunger, managed to streamline intelligence work so that representatives of the Soviet special services achieved tremendous success.

== Cast ==
- Sergey Marin as Pavel Mikhaylovich Fitin
- Igor Petrenko as Aleksandr Mikhaylovich Korotkov
- Ivan Dobronravov as Zakhar Nazarov
- Ekaterina Vilkova as Helga
- Artyom Tkachenko as Aleksandr Petrovich Demyanov
- Egor Beroev as Iskhak Abdulovich Akhmerov
