= Sky (2021 film) =

- Russian theatrical release poster
- Directed by: Igor Kopylov
- Written by: Igor Kopylov
- Produced by: Sergey Scheglov; Inessa Yurchenko; Igor Kopylov
- Starring: Igor Petrenko; Ivan Batarev; Sergey Gubanov; Maria Mironova; Ilya Noskov
- Cinematography: Garik Zhamgaryan; Yevgeny Kordunsky
- Edited by: Vitaly Vinogradov
- Production companies: Ministry of Defence; 3xMedia; Russia-1
- Distributed by: Russian Television and Radio; Central Partnership
- Release date: November 18, 2021
- Running time: 126 minutes
- Country: Russia
- Language: Russian
- Box office: ₽108 million

Sky (Russian: Небо, romanized: Nebo) is a 2021 Russian aviation action war film written and directed by Igor Kopylov, about the Russian military pilots in Syria, and the 2015 shootdown of an Su-24 over Turkey-Syrian airspace. The film was shot with the support of the Ministry of Defense of the Russian Federation and is included in the list of films that must be watched in the Armed Forces of the Russian Federation.

The three main characters are: Lieutenant Colonel Oleg Soshnikov (Igor Petrenko), Captain Konstantin Muravyov (Ivan Batarev), and Major Vadim Zakharov (Sergey Gubanov). Three different characters, three different fates, which are destined to converge at the Khmeimim Air Base.

Sky was theatrically released in Russia on November 18, 2021 by Central Partnership.

== Background ==
The film is based on events in the lives of aviators Oleg Peshkov and Konstantin Murakhtin: on November 24, 2015, during a combat flight, their Russian Sukhoi Su-24 fighter jet was shot down by a Turkish fighter in northern Syria. Peshkov and Murakhtin ejected, but Peshkov was still shot by rebels in the air.

Konstantin Murakhtin, who survived, was awarded the Order of Courage.

== Plot ==
The film is about three Russian Officers with different backgrounds, who converge at the Khmeimim military base, involved with the shootdown of a Russian Su-24 by a Turkish F-16 over Turko-Syrian airspace in 2015, and the rescue of the crew shortly after.

== Cast ==
- Igor Petrenko as Lieutenant Colonel Oleg Soshnikov, the Russian Air Force pilot (based on Oleg Peshkov)
- Ivan Batarev as Captain Konstantin Muravyov, a navigator (based on Konstantin Murakhtin)
- Sergey Gubanov as Major Vadim Zakharov, Special Operations Forces Officer of the Russian Army
- Maria Mironova as Gelena Soshnikova, Oleg Soshnikov's wife
- Glafira Kopylova as Arina Soshnikova, Oleg Soshnikov's daughter
- Marina Mitrofanova as Albina Muravyova, Konstantin Muravyov's wife
- Ilya Noskov as Bagaev
- Dmitry Vlaskin as Zavyalov
- Sergey Zharkov as Chusov
- Dmitry Blokhin as Oleg Soshnikov's friend
- Igor Botvin as Grishin
- Ilya Shakunov as Kubalsky
- Anatoly Kot as Russian Defense Minister Sergey Shubin (based on Sergey Shoygu)
- Igor Filippov as Aksyonov, commander-in-chief of the Russian Aerospace Forces (based on Viktor Bondarev)
- Andrey Abramov as President of Russia
- Sofya Priss as Vera Lopakhina

== Production ==
The film was produced by the 3xMedia film company together with the Russian Ministry of Defense.

=== Filming ===
Principal photography began in the Republic of Crimea in October 2020; later they went to Syria, Moscow, Saint Petersburg and Lipetsk, including at the existing facilities of the Ministry of Defense of the Russian Federation.

== Release ==
=== Marketing ===
The first teaser trailer for Mission "Sky" was released on August 23, 2021.

=== Theatrical ===
The pre-premiere screening of the film took place on November 14, 2021 in Saint Petersburg. The first spectators were officers of the 6th Red Banner Leningrad Army of Air and Air Defence Forces, cadets of military educational institutions, servicemen of the military police, filmmakers, heads of veteran organizations and military patriotic clubs.

Mission "Sky" premiered at the Karo 11 October cinema center in Moscow on November 17, 2021. It is scheduled to be theatrically released in the Russian Federation on November 18, 2021 by Central Partnership.
