= Quiet Comes the Dawn =

Russian horror film

- Movie poster
- Directed by: Pavel Sidorov
- Written by: Yevgeny Kolyadintsev
- Produced by: Vladislav Severtsev; Dmitry Litvinov; Alyona Bogatkova; Svetlana Kabanova; Sofya Sokolova
- Starring: Aleksandra Drozdova; Kuzma Kotrelev; Oksana Akinshina; Aleksandr Molochnikov; Anna Slyu
- Cinematography: Ivan Burlakov
- Music by: Garry Judd
- Production companies: Karoprokat; FMP Group
- Distributed by: Karoprokat; Planeta Inform
- Release date: 31 January 2019
- Running time: 90 minutes
- Country: Russia
- Language: Russian
- Budget: 70 million rubles
- Box office: $829, 236

Quiet Comes the Dawn (Russian: Рассвет, romanized: Rassvet) is a 2019 Russian horror film directed by Pavel Sidorov and starring Aleksandra Drozdova and Oksana Akinshina.

It was released in Russia on 31 January 2019.

== Plot ==
Svetlana’s brother dies under mysterious circumstances. Extremely vivid nightmares begin to haunt her and she decides to turn to the Institute of somnology for help. She and other patients are induced into a collective lucid dream. But at dawn, they awake to a completely different reality that is more horrifying than any nightmare.

== Cast ==
- Aleksandra Drozdova as Svetlana
- Kuzma Kotrelev as Anton, Svetlana's brother
- Oksana Akinshina as Maria, Anton's and Svetlana's mother
- Aleksandr Molochnikov as Kirill Pavlovsky
- Anna Slyu as Lilya
- Valery Kukhareshin as Stepan Laberin, Professor
- Oleg Vasilkov as Vitaly

== Reception ==
Pavel Sidorov's film received mixed, mostly negative reviews from film critics. One of their main complaints include the illogical and incoherent plot.
