= Ivan Kolesnikov =

Russian actor (born 1983)

- Иван Колесников
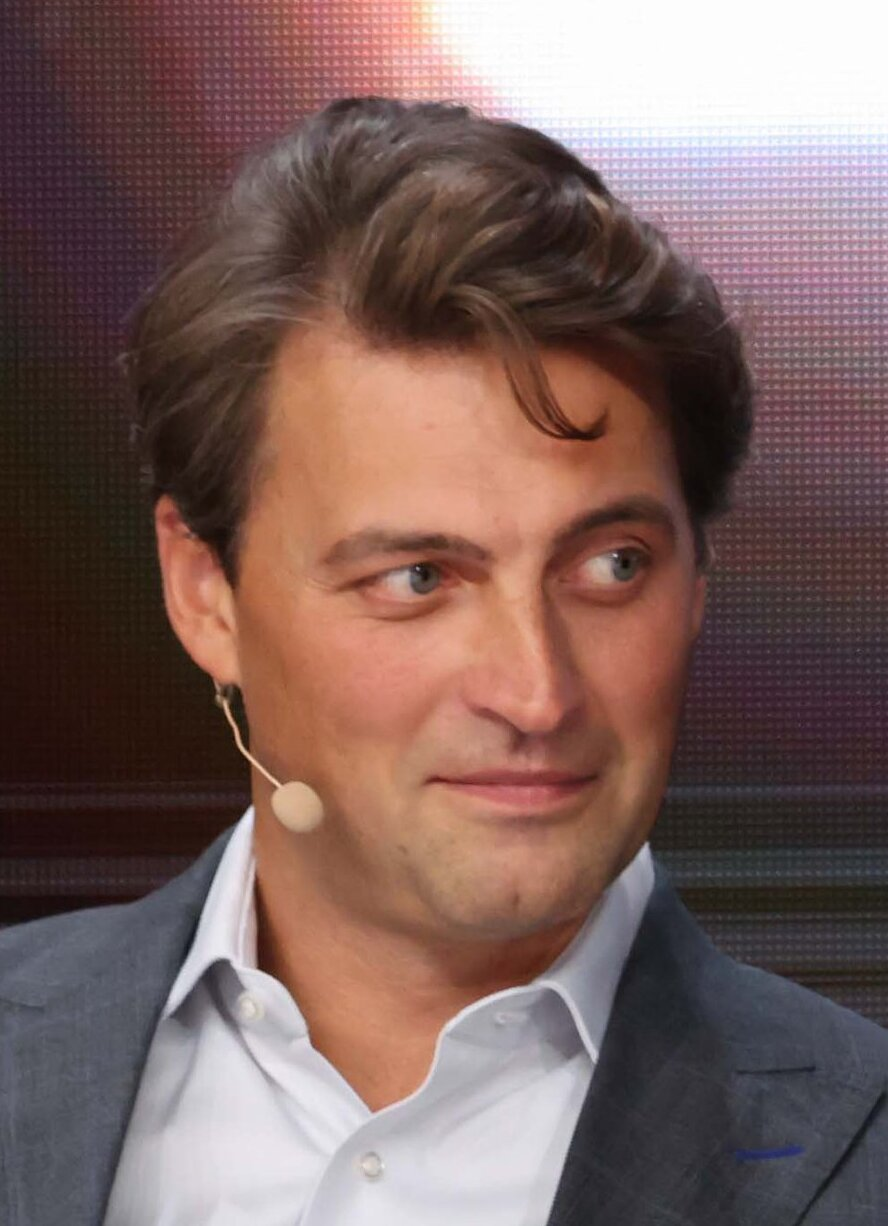
- Kolesnikov in 2026
- Born: Ivan Sergeyevich Kolesnikov; March 18, 1983 (age 43); Moscow, RSFSR, USSR
- Citizenship: Soviet Union; Russia
- Education: Mossovet Theatre
- Occupation: Actor
- Years active: 1991–present
- Height: 1.91 m (6 ft 3 in)
- Spouse: Lina Ramanauskaite
- Children: 3
- Father: Sergei Kolesnikov

Ivan Sergeyevich Kolesnikov (Russian: Ива́н Серге́евич Коле́сников; born March 18, 1983) is a Russian film, television, and stage actor. Nika Award's winner (2016).

== Early life ==
Kolesnikov was born in Moscow, Russian SFSR, Soviet Union. He is son of actor Sergei Kolesnikov.

Since 2002, he has been married to costume designer Lina Ramanauskaitė. Graduated from the Mikhail Shchepkin Higher Theatre School (course of Viktor Korshunov) in 2004. Former actor of Mossovet Theatre.

He appeared in the ninth season of ice show contest Ice Age.

== Personal life ==
They have 3 daughters.

== Filmography ==
List of film credits
Year	Title	Role	Notes
2006	The Sword Bearer	Sergei	
2015	The End of a Great Era	Andrey Lentulov	(ru)
2017	Anna Karenina: Vronsky's Story	Stepan Arkadievich Oblonsky	
2017	Going Vertical	Alexander Belov	
2019	Union of Salvation	Nicholas I	
2022	Peter I: The Last Tsar and the First Emperor	Peter the Great	
2023	Khitrovka. The Sign of Four	Anton Chekhov	
2025	Rodnina	Alexander Zaytsev	

List of television credits
Year	Title	Role	Notes
2005	The White Guard	Galanba	
2016	Sophia	Yuri Vasilievich	
2019	Godunov	Ilya	
2020–present	First Department	Yuri Bragin	(ru)
