= Ad Libitum Corporation =

- Directed by: Polina Oldenburg
- Written by: Polina Oldenburg
- Produced by: Ilya Shemyatov; Natalya Kochetova
- Starring: Shamil Khamatov; Igor Petrenko; Darya Belousova; Evgeniya Kregzhde; Anton Fyodorov; Kristina Babushkina; Karen Badalov; Ivan Stebunov; Aleksandr Ilyin
- Cinematography: Ivan Kolpakov
- Edited by: Dmitry Milyayev
- Music by: Mikhail Morskov; Artyom Fedotov; Aleksey Milovanov; Gleb Nekhoroshev
- Production company: Gramani Film
- Distributed by: Capella Film
- Release date: January 21, 2020
- Running time: 87 minutes
- Country: Russia
- Language: Russian

Ad Libitum Corporation (Russian: Корпорация Ad Libitum) is a 2020 Russian adventure thriller film directed by Polina Oldenburg. It was theatrically released in Russia on January 21, 2020 by Capella Film.

== Plot ==
Ad Libitum Corporation is able to fulfill absolutely any desire. But, if a person has several desires, he will have to pay dearly for their embodiment.

== Cast ==
- Shamil Khamatov
- Igor Petrenko
- Darya Belousova
- Evgeniya Kregzhde
- Anton Fyodorov
- Kristina Babushkina
- Karen Badalov
- Ivan Stebunov
- Aleksandr Ilyin
