= Valery Kukhareshin =

Soviet and Russian stage, film and dubbing actor

- Валерий Кухарешин
- Born: Valery Aleksandrovich Kukhareshin; 7 December 1957 (age 68); Leningrad, RSFSR, USSR
- Citizenship: Soviet Union; Russia
- Occupations: Actor, dubbing
- Years active: 1980—present

Valery Aleksandrovich Kukhareshin (Russian: Валерий Александрович Кухаре́шин; born 7 December 1957) is a Soviet and Russian stage, film and dubbing actor.

Merited Artist of the Russian Federation (1994), People's Artist of Russia (2005). He also was the official Russian voice of Disney's Scrooge McDuck for more than 20 years, first in the animated series Mickey Mouse Works of 1999.

Born on 7 December 1957 in Leningrad, Russian SFSR, Soviet Union (now Saint Petersburg, Russia).

== Selected filmography ==
- Understudy Takes Effect (1983) as episode
- Socrates (1991) as Plato
- The Alaska Kid (1993) as man at the ball
- Life and Adventures of Four Friends 2 (1993) as Nikita's dad
- Operation Happy New Year (1996) as Karl Ivanovich
- Anna Karenina (1997) as doctor
- The Romanovs: An Imperial Family (2000) as Leon Trotsky
- Bandit Petersburg (2001) as Colonel Leikin
- Deadly Force (2001) as Prince
- Streets of Broken Lights (2001) as Boris Sergeevich Gostev
- Killer's Diary (2002) as Alexander Blok
- Muhtar's return (2004) as episode
- Brezhnev (2005) as Unkovsky
- Alexander (2008) as Eric XI of Sweden
- Bury Me Behind the Baseboard (2009) as Aaron Moiseevich
- The White Guard (2012) as pathologist
- Catherine the Great (2015) as Mikhail Illarionovich Vorontsov
- Something for Nothing (2016) as Steven Walker
- Anna Karenina: Vronsky's Story (2017) as station head
- Matilda (2017) as episode
- Quiet Comes the Dawn (2019) as Laberin
- The Silver Skates (2020) as a senior chef
- The Master and Margarita (2024) as Rimsky
