= Normalny tolko ya =

Only Me is Normal
- Directed by: Anton Bogdanov
- Written by: Anton Bogdanov
- Produced by: Anton Bogdanov
- Starring: Anton Bogdanov; Olga Lerman; Konstantin Khabensky; Maksim Vitorgan; Sergey Kutergin; Egor Guskov; Sofi Vitauta; Igor Gasparyan
- Cinematography: Oleg Lukichyov
- Edited by: Anna Kruty
- Music by: Pavel Artemyev; Anton Khabibulin
- Release date: December 2, 2021 (Russia)
- Country: Russia
- Language: Russian

Only Me is Normal (Russian: Нормальный только я, romanized: Normalny tolko ya) is a 2021 Russian comedy film directed by Anton Bogdanov. It was theatrically released in Russia on December 2, 2021.

== Plot ==
The film takes place in the children's camp "Red Falcon", which has been declared an emergency due to a corrupt scheme by its director, Igor Novozhilov, and the local mayor, Viktor Ryurikovich, who plan to demolish it for a new housing project. Suddenly, a group of children with disabilities arrives at the camp, challenging the director's plans. Igor tries everything to make them leave, but his attempts fail. In a last-ditch effort, he insists on bringing in healthy children from poor families, leading to a clash between the two groups: the disabled children, often overprotected at home, and the healthy ones, who feel neglected.

== Cast ==
- Anton Bogdanov as Igor Novozhilov
- Olga Lerman as Nadya
- Konstantin Khabensky as Viktor Ryurikovich
- Maksim Vitorgan as Roma
- Sergey Kutergin as Albert Gennadyevich
- Egor Guskov as Kostya
- Sofi Vitauta as Katya
- Igor Gasparyan as Yusuf

== Production ==
The film's cast included actual disabled children from Perm.
