= The Flood (2022 film) =

- Directed by: Ivan Tverdovskiy
- Written by: Ivan Tverdovskiy
- Produced by: Mila Rozanova; Daria Voloshko; Sofia Belkova
- Starring: Anna Slyu; Sofya Shidlovskaya; Maxim Shchyogolev
- Cinematography: Artyom Yemelyanov
- Edited by: Ivan Tverdovskiy
- Music by: Nikolay Skvortsov
- Production company: New Рeople
- Distributed by: Cinema Art Pro
- Release dates: December 6, 2022 (Zimny Film Festival); April 6, 2023 (Russia)
- Running time: 97 min.
- Country: Russia
- Language: Russian
- Box office: $6 497

The Flood (Russian: Наводнение, romanized: Navodneniye) is a 2022 Russian drama film directed by Ivan Tverdovskiy. It is based on the 1929 short story by Yevgeny Zamyatin.

== Plot ==
Swimming coach Sofya and her husband Trofim take in their orphaned niece, Anya, a talented young athlete who, after losing her parents, has become withdrawn and stopped speaking. This silence creates significant challenges for Anya, leading to difficulties in connecting with her peers, some of whom openly bully her. Meeting a young man named Dima from a boys’ team helps Anya feel valued and allows her to develop a true friendship with him. Meanwhile, Sofya and Trofim's relationship faces its own serious trials.

== Cast ==
- Anna Slyu as Sophia
- Sofya Shidlovskaya as Anya
- Maxim Shchyogolev as Trofim
- Vlad Prokhorov as Dima
- Ekaterina Steblina as Irina
- Natalya Pavlenkova as Lyudmila
- Vladimir Maisinger as Stepan
- Marina Kleshcheva as Svetlana
- Stasya Venkova as Christina
- Ugne Zavistauskaite as Sveta Mikhailova

== Critical response ==
The Flood received generally positive reviews from professional film critics.

Film.ru author Maxim Ershov rated the film 6 points. In his opinion, this is “a hopeless and shocking drama about a series of tragedies in one family”. Anton Fomochkin, in his review for Seans, noted: “Microcosm of “The Flood” is a damp closet, the darkness of which was sharply disturbed by the cold beam of a flashlight. Something is running and fidgeting in the light. Only the cold body of the weakest remains motionless the one who cannot survive this closet night”. Vasily Koretsky (Kommersant) summarizes: “The main thing in Tverdovsky’s interpretation of Zamyatin’s text is the radical destruction of all “feelings” as an apology for violence”.

At the same time, critic of the Rossiyskaya Gazeta publication Dmitry Sosnovsky considered Tverdovskiy's film an “impenetrable piece of dirt”, filmed “with the intent to cause maximum discomfort to the viewer not only moral, but also physical”.

== See also ==
- The Flood (1993 film)
