= Sergei Kolesnikov (actor) =

Russian actor (1955–2023)

- Сергей Колесников
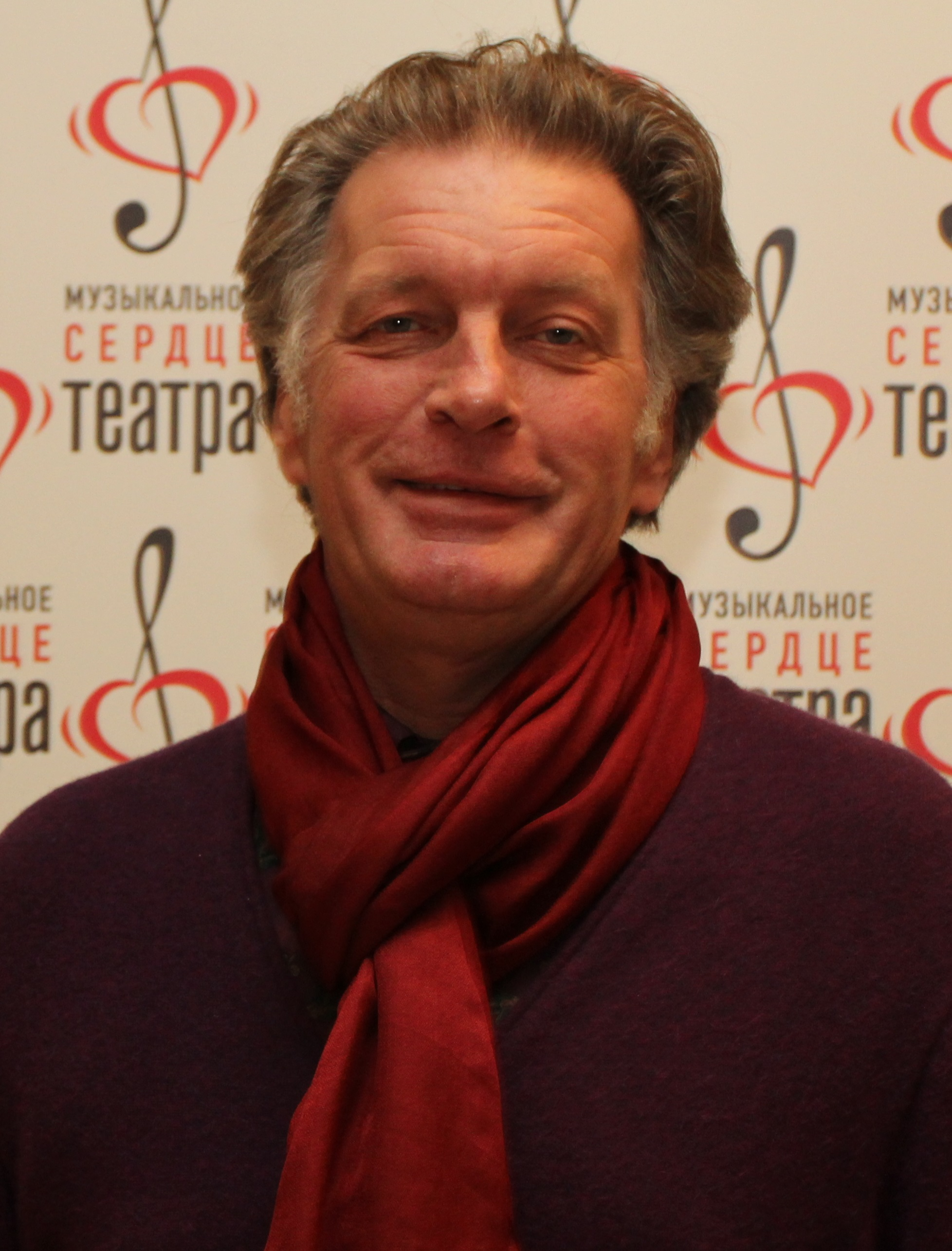
- Kolesnikov in 2012
- Born: Sergei Valentinovich Kolesnikov; 4 January 1955; Moscow, Russian SFSR, Soviet Union
- Died: 29 April 2023 (aged 68)
- Citizenship: Soviet Union; Russia
- Education: Moscow Art Theatre School
- Occupation: Actor
- Years active: 1976–2023
- Spouse: Maria Alexandrovna
- Children: 2, including Ivan

Sergei Valentinovich Kolesnikov (Russian: Серге́й Валенти́нович Коле́сников; 4 January 1955 – 29 April 2023) was a Soviet and Russian film and theatre actor, television presenter, and Honored Artist of Russia (1994).

== Biography ==
Sergei Kolesnikov was born on 4 January 1955, in Moscow in a family of Soviet intellectuals. His mother was Maria Pavlovna Kolesnikova (born 1920) and his father Valentin Kolesnikov (1915–1977). His brothers include Vladimir and Igor Kolesnikov (born 1949).

In 1978 he graduated from the Moscow Art Theatre School (with course leaders Sofya Pilyavskaya and Vladimir Bogomolov) and was accepted into the troupe of the Moscow Art Theater. After the division of the theater he worked in the Gorky Moscow Art Theatre. In 1990 he moved to the Chekhov Moscow Art Theatre, where he worked until October 2011.

From 21 May 2006 to 7 October 2012, he starred in the leading television program Fazenda (Channel One Russia).

Kolesnikov died on 29 April 2023, at age 68.

== Selected filmography ==
- 1985: Man with an Accordion as Lopatin 's son
- 1991: Tsar Ivan the Terrible as Khlopko
- 1992 / 1997: Trifles of Life as Sergei Kuznetsov
- 1994: St. Petersburg Secrets as investigator
- 2004: Daddy as head of the hospital train
- 2005: The Case of Dead Souls as Derzhimorda
- 2007 / 2009: Daddy's Daughters as Permyakov
- 2009: Cold Souls as Dmitry
- 2011: Chapiteau Show (cameo)
- 2013: A Good Day to Die Hard as Viktor Chagarin
- 2013: Secrets of the Institute for Noble Maidens as Prince Aleksey Sergeevich Vyshnevetsky
- 2014: Black Sea as Levchenko
- 2018: McMafia as priest
- 2022: Land of Legends as monk Dionysius

== Personal life ==
- Kolesnikov was married to wife Maria Alexandrovna Kolesnikova (Velikanova), a film, theater, and TV artist. He had two sons, Alexander (born 1981) who graduated from an architectural school, and Ivan (born 1983), an actor. He had two granddaughters, Avdotya (born 2006) and Vera (born 2013), from Ivan.

== Awards ==
- Honored Artist of Russia (1994)
- Medal of the Order "For Merit to the Fatherland" (1998)
