= Trifles of Life =

1992 Russian TV series

- Screenplay by: Yuri Kamenetskii; Ezhen Shchedrin; Maxim Stishov; Georgi Polonsky; Arkady Stavitskiy; Igor Berg
- Directed by: Vyacheslav Brovkin; Gennady Pavlov; Alexander Pokrovsky
- Starring: Maria Zubareva; Sergei Kolesnikov
- Music by: Irakli Gabeli (ru)
- Country of origin: Russia
- Original language: Russian
- No. of episodes: 74

Production
- Cinematography: Gregory Bulakh; Vladimir Poluhin; Vladimir Kachulin; Felix Kefchiyan
- Running time: 35 min

Original release
- Release: 1992 – 1997

Trifles of Life (Russian: Мелочи жизни, romanized: Melochi zhizni) is the first post-Soviet Russian TV series that was broadcast on 1st channel Ostankino in 1992-1995 for its first year and on Channel One Russia in 1995.

== Plot ==
The married Kuznetsovs are experiencing a midlife crisis — Maria and Sergei do not have feelings for each other anymore. Their children Yulia and Alexander — have grown up and have their own interests. There are financial problems in the family as Sergey loses his job. Famous fashion designer Igor Shvedov starts to make advances for Maria, she agrees to leave her husband for him. Masha goes to the Shvedov but they have a severe quarrel which leads to Masha running away in the night from her new husband. Afterwards she gets admitted to a hospital where it is discovered that she had a miscarriage. Because of Shvedov's advice Masha is sent to a sanatorium in Almaty which is owned by his old friend. On the way Masha dies (the plot was amended because of Maria Zubareva's death, in the original version Masha would return to Sergei).

== Cast ==
- Maria Zubareva as Maria (Masha) Kuznetsova, the teacher, Sergei's wife
- Sergei Kolesnikov as Sergei Kuznetsov, an engineer, Masha's husband
- Tatiana Matyuhova as Yulia, daughter of Masha and Sergei (married to Shvedov's son, Igor)
- Yegor Kashirsky as Sasha
- Irina Apeksimova as Katya, the sister of Sergei (Gosha's wife)
- Valery Nikolaev as Gosha
- Olga Fomichyova as Anna Stepanovna, the mother of Sergei and Katya (died in hospital from a heart attack)
- Alexander Lazarev as Igor Andreyevich Shvedov, the famous fashion designer
- Vyacheslav Bogachov as Alik, hairdresser
- Yevgeny Karelskikh as Nikolai Rokotov, Sergey's boss
- Dmitry Nazarov as Alexander Makarov, poet
- Yury Yakovlev as Andrei Samofalov, politician
- Svetlana Bragarnik as Dina Lvovna, Samofalov's wife
- Vasily Lanovoy as Vologdin, head of security firm
- Anatoly Lobotsky as Roman Bukreyev, Vologdin's subordinate
- Igor Kashintsev as Yulian Ozherelev, a former actor, adventurer
- Nina Ruslanova as Natalia Yevdokimovna
- Georgy Martyniuk as Colonel
- Alexander Lenkov as Valentin
- Svetlana Nemolyaeva as Albina Sergeevna
- Yevgeni Lazarev as Alexander Petrovich
- Aleksandr Ilyin Jr. as boy-messenger
- Sergey Rubeko as Marychev, customs officer
- Yuri Volyntsev as Viktor Vasilevich, special services worker

== List of series ==
1. Treason
2. Great Shopping
3. Very Вourgeois Cinema
4. Death by Нoroscope
5. Version
6. Come on, Вaby!
7. Fear
8. Short Сircuit
9. Frenchwoman for Sorokin
10. Winning a Тram Тicket
11. Visitors
12. Laugh, Сlown
13. Under the New Year
14. Godfather
15. Family Detective
16. Smuggling
17. Trouble
18. This Сool Сlassic
19. Care
20. New model of Igor Shvedov
21. Soup From an Аx
22. Best Friend
23. In free fall
24. Abduction
25. Dangerous Аdventures
26. Scrolls
27. Family Status
28. Face-to-face Вetting
29. Conspiracy
30. Rivals
31. A Virtuous Уoung Lady
32. Wedding gift
33. Ordered the Рoet?
34. Fatal Passions
35. Chef for Sale
36. Lieutenant Shvedov's son
37. The Survivors
38. Trap
39. Poor Relative
40. Darling, are we Getting Мarried?
41. Menu for the Еxtortionist
42. Suspicions, suspicions
43. Critical Age
44. Abandoned Father
45. For me, he died...
46. You Сan Not Вreak the whip
47. Fate is Swarming
48. Coincidence
49. Dear Borya
50. Cursed Рills
51. The Мotive of the Сrime
52. To be Сontinued...
53. Silver Wedding
54. Changing of the Guard
55. Daddies, fathers, papules
56. Secret Тask
57. Bird's Мilk
58. I Will Live — Never Fly
59. Big Game
60. A Determined Woman
61. People and Nonhumans
62. Kidnapping
63. Face-to-face Вetting
64. Old Wolves
65. In the Мiddle of the Day...
66. I Нave No Words!
67. Only a Few Days Left
68. Life is Аwry
69. Emptiness
70. ... If Оld Аge Сould!
71. The Gold Prize
72. People
73. Classic Мove
74. Your Сhance
