= Poyekhavshaya =

Off the Rails
- Directed by: Anton Maslov
- Written by: Svetlana Shteba; Mariya Maslova; Friderike Brin; Nzhde Ayrapetyan; Tatyana Goncharova
- Story by: Anna Smolina
- Based on: Why Stay at Home? by Anna Smolina
- Produced by: Eduard Iloyan (ru); Vitaly Shlyappo (ru); Denis Zhalinsky; Aleksey Trotsyuk (ru); Mikhail Tkachenko; Anton Maslov; Ilya Malanin; Sergey Bobza; Natalya Kurenkova; Mariya Maslova; Ivan Kanaev
- Starring: Olga Lerman; Viktor Khorinyak; Dmitry Chebotaryov; Elena Yakovleva; Askar Ilyasov
- Cinematography: Sergey Komarov Jr.
- Edited by: Ekaterina Pivneva
- Music by: Stanislav Becker; Aleksandr Bessonov
- Production companies: Yellow, Black and White; START Studio; Cinema Fund
- Distributed by: Central Partnership
- Release date: March 8, 2023 (Russia)
- Running time: 110 minutes
- Country: Russia
- Language: Russian
- Budget: ₽193 million; $2.343.020
- Box office: ₽524.4 million; $6.5 million

Off the Rails (Russian: Поехавшая, romanized: Poyekhavshaya, lit. 'Traveling by bike') is a 2023 Russian road movie directed by Anton Maslov, author of the book Why Stay at Home? by cyclist Anna Smolina: in 2017, the girl, along with her dachshund, went on a bicycle trip across the country, played by Olga Lerman, together with Viktor Khorinyak, Dmitry Chebotaryov, Elena Yakovleva and Askar Ilyasov starred here.

This film was theatrically released on March 8, 2023. The Central Partnership company acts as a distributor on the territory of the Russian Federation.

== Plot ==
The film follows Anna Smolina, an ordinary woman who makes an unusual decision to break away from her routine life. Seeking change, she embarks on a cross-country bicycle journey through Russia, accompanied by her beloved dachshund, Kapa.

Anna’s destination is the town of Magadan, where she hopes to reconcile with her mother after 13 years of estrangement. Along the way, she encounters new people, makes friends, and faces various challenges. By the end of her journey, Anna gains self-confidence and discovers love.

== Cast ==
- Olga Lerman as Anna "Anya" Smolina, world and Russian champion in long-distance cycling
- dachshund Taisiya as Kapa
- Viktor Khorinyak as Valery "Valera", meeting with whom will bring new positive emotions to Anya's life
- Dmitry Chebotaryov as Roman "Roma", Anya's ex-boyfriend
- Elena Yakovleva as Anna Smolina's mother
- Askar Ilyasov as Alisher Abdalov, delivery man
- Alina Alekseyeva as Marina Komarova, Anya's friend
- Anastasiya Svetlova as Evgenia "Zhenya", a female trucker
- Olesya Zheleznyak as Katerina
- Masha Lobanova as Yana
- Yuliya Topolnitskaya as Kazakova, Anya's classmate
- Anton Maslov as senior flight attendant
- Sophia Zayka as Dasha

== Production ==
=== Filming locations ===
Location filming took place in Moscow, the region of Moscow Oblast, Vladimir Oblast and Nizhny Novgorod Oblast, the Republic of Bashkortostan (Bashkiria), Altai Republic and Lake Baikal - more than 170 locations were specially chosen for this. The team managed to work in completely different weather conditions — from +35 °C at the start of filming to temperatures closer to 0 °C by the end.

== Release ==
=== Theatrical ===
The world premiere was held on March 2, at the capital's cinema "Karo 11 October" on New Arbat Avenue in Moscow. It is scheduled to be theatrically released in Russia should take place in the country's cinemas from the festive International Women's Day on March 8, 2023 by Central Partnership.

== Reception ==
=== Box office ===
The comedy topped the box office in the Russian Federation and the Commonwealth of Independent States in the first week of the show, collecting 135.6 million rubles for the first weekend.
