= One Breath (2020 film) =

Russian film

- Theatrical release poster
- Directed by: Elena Hazanova
- Written by: Alena Alova; Andrey Ivanov
- Produced by: Olga Danova; Svetlana Izvekova; Mariya Smirnova
- Starring: Viktoriya Isakova; Maksim Sukhanov; Vladimir Yaglych; Philip Ershov; Stasya Miloslavskaya; Sergey Sosnovsky; Vladislav Vetrov; Artyom Tkachenko; Olga Lerman
- Cinematography: Ilya Ovsenev
- Edited by: Sergey Ivanov; Anna Mass; Thomas Queille; Maxim Smirnov
- Music by: Sergey Petukhov; Ilia Zelitchonok
- Production company: Public Opinion
- Distributed by: ProfiCinema
- Release date: March 5, 2020
- Running time: 100 minutes
- Country: Russia
- Languages: Russian, English
- Budget: ₽120 million $8 million
- Box office: ₽50 million $648,945

One Breath (Russian: Один вдох, romanized: Odin vdokh) is a 2020 Russian sports drama film directed by Elena Hazanova about the unhappy heroine, whose new hobby, full of adrenaline and dangers, helps her to take a fresh look at life and find herself in this world, the film stars Viktoriya Isakova to prepare for the role of a year engaged in freediving.

The film is based on the biography of multiple champion and world freediving champion Natalia Molchanova, who founded the first internationally recognized national school of freediving (Freediving Federation) with her colleagues in Russia, has authored her own method of teaching freediving, books and films on freediving.

It was theatrically released in Russia on March 5, 2020 by ProfiCinema.

== Plot ==
The film tells the story of the forty-year-old Marina Gordeeva, who suffers in an unhappy marriage, and has a job that brings her no pleasure. She feels she has nothing to look forward to. She then discovers the dangerous, deadly sport of free-diving. Immersion in the underwater world, where she must face her fears, becomes an opportunity to escape from reality and, holding her breath, plunge headlong into a pool of adrenaline, thoughts and new perspectives.

== Cast ==
- Viktoriya Isakova as Marina Gordeeva
- Maksim Sukhanov as Vadim Batyarov, coach
- Vladimir Yaglych as Ignat Kaverin, a rescuer
- Philip Ershov as Sasha Gordeev, Marina's son
- Stasya Miloslavskaya as Anya Gordeeva, Marina's daughter
- Sergey Sosnovsky as Valeriy, Marina's father
- Vladislav Vetrov as sports doctor
- Artyom Tkachenko as director of the sports institute
- Olga Lerman as episode
- Aleksey Matoshin as Marina's ex-husband
- Anastasiya Karaulova as Larisa, freediver
- Elizaveta Khmelevskaya as Nastya, freediver
- Kristian Kiehling as Rupert

== Production ==
To work on underwater shots, a leading world team of open-air specials and director Julie Gautier, known for her artistic shorts, which she shoots with her husband Guillaume Néry, were invited. Both are professionally engaged in freediving, and in the past — champions and champions in this sport.

=== Filming ===
The first Russian feature film shot in the open sea at a hundred-meter depth.

Principal photography began on October 2, 2018 to September 2019 at the Academy of Civil Protection of the Ministry of Emergency Situations of Russia in the city of Khimki, Moscow Oblast, diving scenes were filmed in the open sea off the coast of Malta.

=== Music ===
The music for this sports picture was composed by Sergey Petukhov and Ilya Zelichenok.

== Release ==
The premiere date in Moscow is to take place in the cinemas of the Russian Federation on March 5, 2020 by ProfiCinema.

=== Marketing ===
On November 7, 2019, the official trailer for the film was released.
