= Ivan Dobronravov =

Russian actor

- Born: Ivan Fyodorovich Dobronravov; 2 June 1989 (age 36); Voronezh, Russian SFSR, Soviet Union
- Occupation: Actor
- Years active: 2001–present
- Parent(s): Fyodor Dobronravov; Irina Dobronravova
- Relatives: Viktor Dobronravov (brother)

Ivan Fyodorovich Dobronravov (Russian: Иван Фёдорович Добронравов; born 2 June 1989) is a Russian actor best known for his lead role in the 2003 film The Return. His father is actor Fyodor Dobronravov.

== Filmography ==
- The Return (2003)
- Crush (2009)
- Home (2011)
- Moms (2012)
- Judas (2013)
- Ekaterina (2014)
- The Method (2015)
- Buy Me (2018)
- Has Anyone Seen My Girl? (2020)
- Nachalnik razvedki (2022)
- Kombinaciya (2024)
