= Olga Lerman =

Russian stage and film actress (born 1988)

- Ольга Лерман
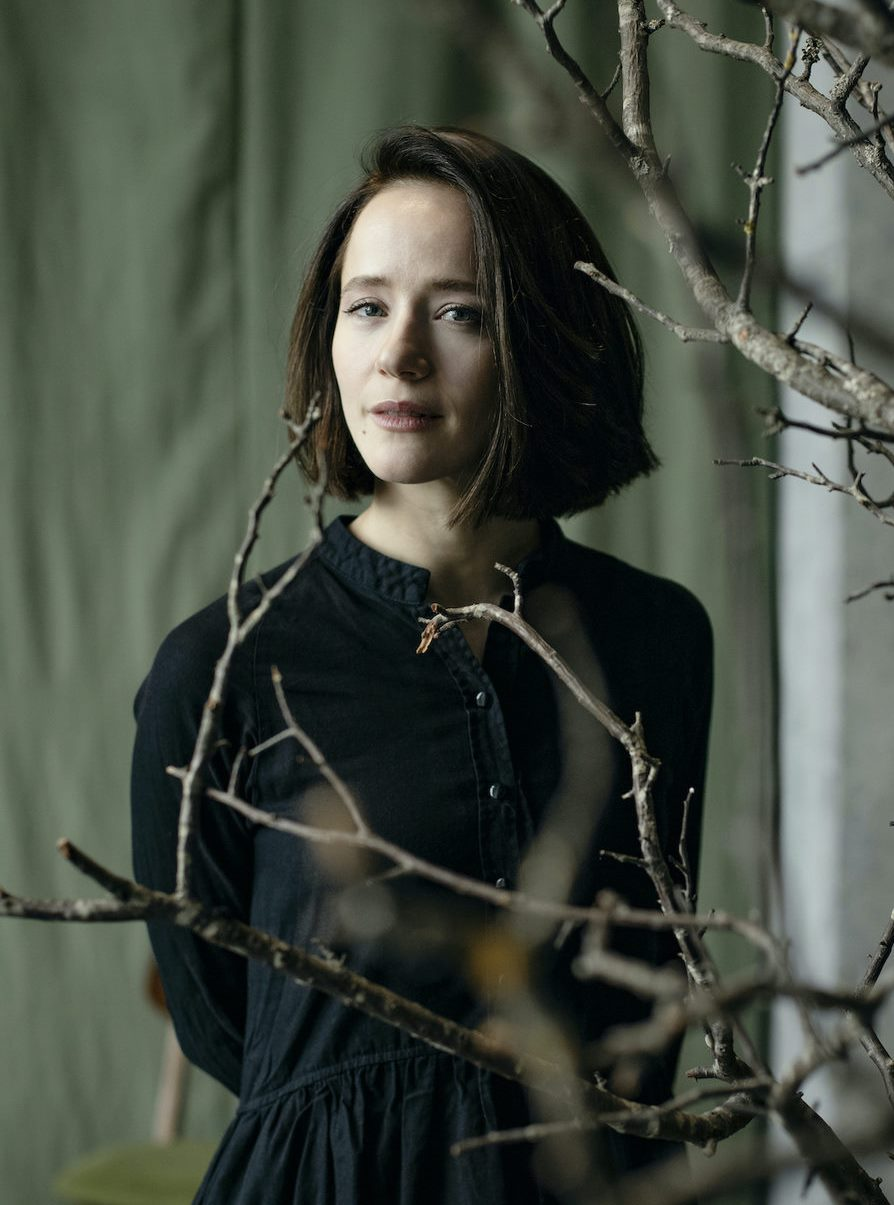
- Born: Olga Leonidovna Lerman; 25 March 1988 (age 38); Baku, Azerbaijan SSR, USSR
- Citizenship: Russian
- Education: Vakhtangov Theatre, Moscow
- Occupation: Actress
- Years active: 2009–present

Olga Leonidovna Lerman (Russian: Ольга Леонидовна Лерман; born 25 March 1988) is a Russian stage and film actress. She appeared in more than 30 films since 2009.

== Biography ==
Olga Lerman was born in Baku, Azerbaijan Soviet Socialist Republic, Soviet Union (now Azerbaijan). She was born in a theatrical family. Mother — Victoria Lerman, head of the production department of the Azerbaijani Russian Drama Theater named after Samad Vurgun. Stepfather — actor of the same theater, People's Artist of Azerbaijan Fuad Tajeddin oglu Osmanov.

Lerman first appeared on stage in early childhood. From the age of 4 to 7, she was engaged in rhythmic gymnastics. She studied at a comprehensive school before entering the Baku Choreographic School. After moving to Krasnodar, she graduated from the Krasnodar Choreographic School's department of folk dances. In 2006-2011, she studied at the B. V. Shchukin Higher Theater School (course of Yu. B. Nifontov). Starting from her 3rd year, she played in the Moscow Satire Theater.

In 2011, immediately after graduating from the Shchukin School, she was accepted into the troupe of the Vakhtangov Moscow Theater.

== Selected filmography ==
=== Film ===
| Year | Title | Role | Notes |
|---|---|---|---|
| 2019 | One Breath | | episode |
| 2020 | AK-47 | Ekaterina 'Katya' Moiseeva | |
| 2021 | White Snow | Yelena Vyalbe | |
| 2021 | Normalny tolko ya | Nadya | |
| 2022 | Eleven Silent Men | Lera Vasilieva | |
| 2023 | Poyekhavshaya | Anna Smolina | |
| 2025 | Catherine the Great | Catherine II | |

=== Television ===
| Year | Title | Role | Notes |
|---|---|---|---|
| 2013 | Pyotr Leschenko. Everything That Was... | Katya Zavyalova in her youth | |
| 2018 | Secrets of Mrs. Kirsanova | Larisa Kirsanova | (ru) |
| 2020 | Rodkom | Svetlana Surkova | |
