= Igor Petrenko =

Russian actor of cinema and theater (born 1977)

- Игорь Петренко
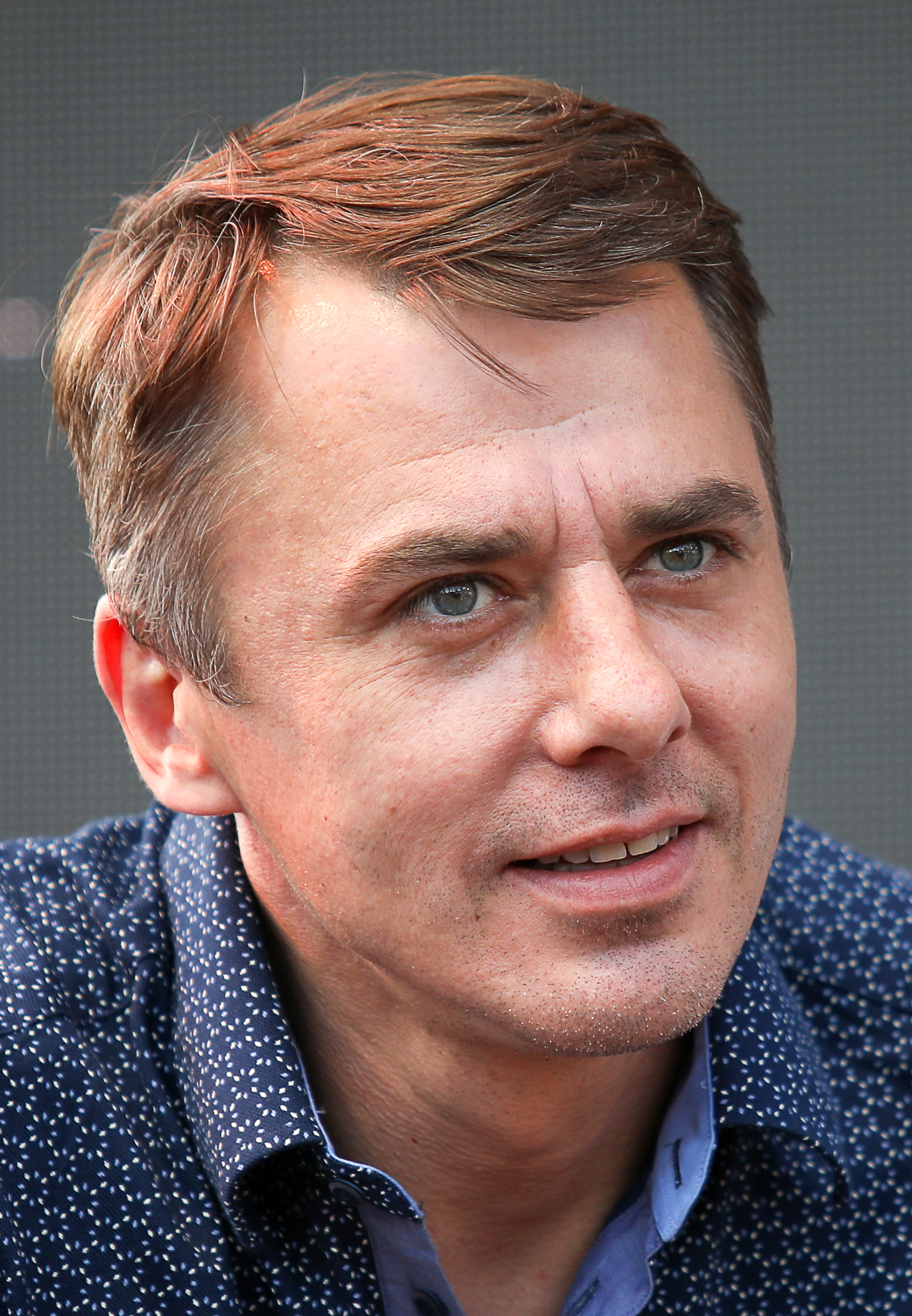
- Petrenko at the Red Square book festival 2019.
- Born: Igor Petrovich Petrenko; August 23, 1977 (age 48); Potsdam, East Germany
- Occupation: Actor
- Years active: 2000–present
- Spouse(s): Irina Leonova (2000 – 2004); Ekaterina Klimova (2004 – 2014; 2 child)
- Children: 2
- Parent(s): Pyotr Vladimirovich Petrenko; Tatyana Anatolievna
- Awards: Nika Award - 2002

Igor Petrovich Petrenko (Russian: И́горь Петро́вич Петре́нко; born August 23, 1977) is a Russian actor of cinema and theater. In 2002, President of Russia, Vladimir Putin gave him The State prize of Russia.

== Biography ==
Igor Petrenko was born on August 23, 1977, in Potsdam (GDR) to a Soviet military family. His father Pyotr Vladimirovich Petrenko was a lieutenant colonel, and in addition to military service, he was a candidate of chemical sciences. Igor's mother, Tatyana Anatolievna Petrenko, was a professional translator from English. When Igor was three years old, the family moved to Moscow.

As a child, his main hobbies were gymnastics, judo and sambo. Among his favorite school subjects was the English language.

In 2000 he graduated from the Shchepkin Higher Theatre School in Moscow. Igor became a famous actor after he appeared in the "Zvezda" TV Series. Thanks to his role in this series he won the "Nika" award in the nomination of the "Discovery of the year" in 2003.

For his acting skills, the actor was awarded the Presidential Award (Officially, the State Prize of the Russian Federation), and in 2004 he was awarded the "Triumph" Award as the best young actor.

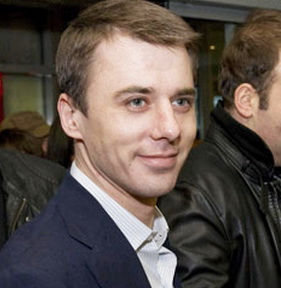
Igor Petrenko at the premiere in cinema Moscow, 2009.

In 2012, he played the role of Sherlock Holmes in a new series based on the works of Arthur Conan Doyle.

== Personal life ==
Petrenko married his classmate, actress Irina Leonova, immediately after they both graduated in 2000. The marriage ended four years later.

In 2004 he divorced Leonova to marry actress Ekaterina Klimova, with whom he struck up a romance on the set of Moscow Windows. In addition to Klimova's daughter from a previous marriage, Liza Khoroshilova, Petrenko and Klimova had two boys together, Matvey and Korney. They divorced on 10 July 2014.

Petrenko has a daughter named Sophia-Karolina (b. 24 December 2014) with St. Petersburg actress Kristina Brodskaya.

== Selected filmography ==
=== Film ===
Year	Title	Role	Notes
2000	The conditioned reflex	Roman Zolotov	(ru)
2002	The Star	Vladimir Travkin	
2003	Carmen	Sergey Nikitin	(ru)
2004	A Driver for Vera	Viktor, the driver	
2004	Name Day	Viktor	(ru)
2006	Wolfhound	Luchezar	
2007	When she did not expect	Dmitry Klimov	
2009	And you, Brutus !? World history of betrayals		(ru)
2009	Taras Bulba	Andrew	
2009	Forbidden Reality	Matthew Sobolev	(ru)
2010	We are from the Future 2	Sergei Filatov, "Borman"	
2010	Everyone has a war	Boris	
2010	Retiree-2: do not throw his	Viktor Zimin	
2012	Dreams of plasticine	Boris	
2013	7 Main Wishes	Anton Tsvetkov	
2013	Bulag	Sergey	
2013	Road	Igor Sokolov (Falcon)	
2015	How to get a woman		
2015	The Secret of the Snow Queen	Van	
2016	Viking	Varyazhko, the prince of Yaropolk's retinue	
2018	Decision to Liquidate		
2019	Pilgrim	Gleb	
2019	Union of Salvation	Baranov, a demoted major, grenadier of the Chernigov Regiment revolt	
2020	Winter	Alexander	
2021	Ad Libitum Corporation		
2021	Sky	Soshnikov	
2023	Nuremberg	Major Bablenkov	
2024	Fedya. Narodnyy futbolist		
2025	Rodnina	Konstantin Nikolayevich	

=== Television ===
Year	Title	Role	Notes
2000	Black Pearl		
2000	Simple Truth	Sasha	
2000	The Black Room		TV series
2001	Moscow Windows	Leonid Terekhov	
2002	Willys		TV series
2003	The Gentlemen of the Sea Star	Igor	TV Mini-Series
2003	The best city in the world	Leonid Terekhov	
2004	Sins of the Fathers	Ivan Kalistratov	
2004	Cadets	lieutenant Dobrov	
2004	Knights of the Sea Star		TV series
2006	Hero of Our Time	Grigory Pechorin	TV series
2009	Cream	Ruslan Bulavin	
2010	Robinson	Alexander Robertson	
2011	"Cedar" pierces the sky	Sergey Vladimirovich Lykov	
2011	Pasha Lucky	Pavel Golubev	
2011	Everyone has a war	Boris Krokhin	
2011	Separation	Alexey Mitrokhin	
2013	Sherlock Holmes	Sherlock Holmes / Mycroft Holmes	TV series
2014	Cancel all restrictions	Alexander Morozov	
2014	Last Janissaries	Ermolai	
2013	Dad rented	Ilia Petrovich Solomatin	TV Mini-Series
2015	The Alchemist. Elixir Faust	Andrew Nevel	
2015	Tamara	Dubrovsky	
2015	Non-jurisdictional	Andrey Voronov, a KGB officer	
2017	You All Infuriate Me	Nikita	TV series
2021	Master	Leonid Yeryomin	TV series
2022	Nachalnik razvedki	Aleksandr Mikhaylovich Korotkov	TV series
