= Jumpman (film) =

- Directed by: Ivan I. Tverdovskiy
- Written by: Ivan I. Tverdovskiy
- Produced by: Natalya Mokritskaya
- Starring: Anna Slyu; Pavel Chinaryov; Vilma Kutaviciute; Denis Vlasenko; Daniil Steklov
- Cinematography: Denis Alarcón Ramírez
- Edited by: Ivan I. Tverdovskiy
- Music by: Kirill Richter
- Production companies: Film and Music Entertainment (IRE)
- Distributed by: Russian Report
- Release date: July 4, 2018 (Karlovy Vary International Film Festival)
- Running time: 88 min.
- Countries: Russia; Lithuania; Ireland; France
- Language: Russian
- Box office: $18 777

Jumpman (Russian: Подбросы, romanized: Podbrosy) is a 2018 drama film directed and written by Ivan I. Tverdovskiy. The film received mixed reviews from critics.

== Plot ==
The film tells us about a young man named Denis, who was left as a child by his parents, but this did not prevent him from becoming a strong person. One day he meets his mother, along with whom he goes to corrupt Moscow, where he is drawn into a risky adventure.

== Cast ==
- Denis Vlasenko as Denis
- Anna Slyu as Oksana, Denis's mother
- Pavel Chinaryov as the prosecutor
- Vilma Kutaviciute as the lawyer
- Daniil Steklov as the traffic policeman
- Alexandra Ursuliak as the judge
- Maksim Vitorgan as the buisnessman

== Reception ==
=== Critical response ===
Jumpman has an approval rating of 60% on review aggregator website Rotten Tomatoes, based on five reviews, and an average rating of 5/10.
