= Khitrovka. The Sign of Four =

- Directed by: Karen Shakhnazarov
- Written by: Ekaterina Kochetkova; Elena Podrez; Karen Shakhnazarov
- Based on: The Sign of Four by Arthur Conan Doyle
- Produced by: Karen Shakhnazarov; Galina Shadur
- Starring: Konstantin Kryukov; Mikhail Porechenkov; Alexander Oleshko; Ivan Kolesnikov; Aleksei Vertkov; Anfisa Chernykh
- Cinematography: Oleg Lukichyov
- Edited by: Irina Kozhemyakina
- Music by: Yuri Poteyenko
- Production companies: Kuryer Film Studio; Mosfilm
- Distributed by: KaroRental
- Release date: May 18, 2023 (Russia)
- Running time: 129 minutes
- Country: Russia
- Language: Russian
- Budget: ₽200 million
- Box office: ₽105.6 million; $1.155.594

Khitrovka. The Sign of Four (Russian: Хитровка. Знак четырёх) is a 2023 Russian mystery film directed by Karen Shakhnazarov about the theatrical bohemians of the early 20th century and the inhabitants of the Khitrovka slums. It stars Konstantin Kryukov, Mikhail Porechenkov and Alexander Oleshko. The film is based on the works of Vladimir Gilyarovsky and Arthur Conan Doyle's novel The Sign of Four.

This film was theatrically released on May 18, 2023, by "KaroRental" Film Distribution.

== Plot ==
The film takes place in Moscow in 1902, when director Konstantin Stanislavsky is looking for inspiration to stage a new play and, together with Vladimir Gilyarovsky, a connoisseur of the capital's slums, goes to the criminal Khitrovka and gets involved in the investigation into the murder of a local resident with a dark past.

== Cast ==
- Konstantin Kryukov as Konstantin Stanislavsky (Konstantin Stanislavski in English)
- Mikhail Porechenkov as Vladimir Gilyarovsky
- Alexander Oleshko as Vladimir Nemirovich-Danchenko
- Ivan Kolesnikov as Anton Chekhov
- Anfisa Chernykh as Ksenia, a thief nicknamed "The Princess"
- Alexey Vertkov as "The Englishman"
- Boris Kamorzin as Testov, owner of an antique shop
- Yevgeny Stychkin as Rudnikov, an official of the Moscow detective police
- Stanislav Eventov as Professor Strassenmeier
- Ayub Tsingiev as Raja
- Vasant Balan as Sanjit, Raja's nephew

== Production ==
Karen Shakhnazarov's film is a free adaptation of Arthur Conan Doyle's Sherlock Holmes novel The Sign of the Four (1890). Holmes and related characters are omitted from the film, and the setting is changed from Victorian London to early 1900s Russia.
