= Anna Slyu =

Russian actress

- Анна Слю
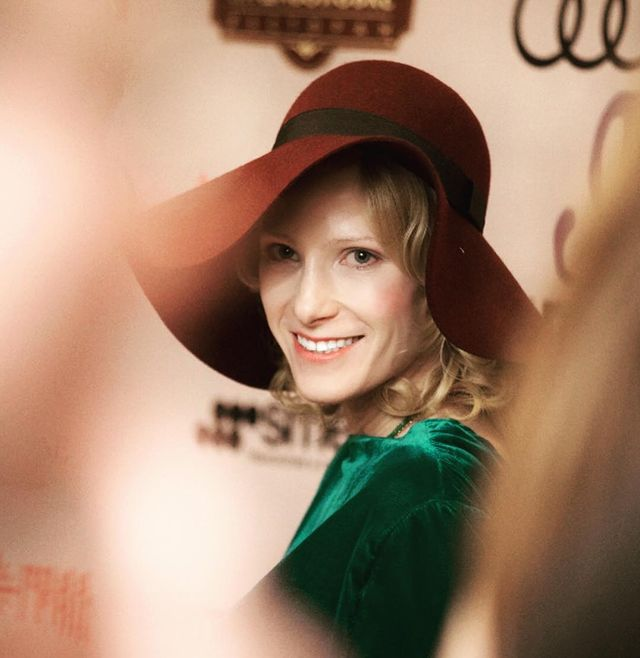
- Slyu in 2019
- Born: Anna Andreevna Slyusaryova; 27 March 1980 (age 46); Moscow, RSFSR, USSR
- Occupation: Actress
- Years active: 2001–present
- Spouse: Vladimir Smirnov
- Children: 2

Anna Andreevna Slyusaryova (Russian: А́нна Андреевна Слюсарёва; born March 27, 1980), known professionally as Anna Slyu, is a Russian film and television actress.

She graduated in 2001 from Boris Shchukin Theatre Institute (teacher Yuri Shlykov). The actress is married and has two children.

== Selected filmography ==
- Night Watch (2004), as Katya
- Day Watch (2005), as Katya
- My Fair Nanny (Note: Television series) (2006), as Azalea
- Nine Lives of Nestor Makhno (2005), as Halyna Kouzmenko
- Brothel Lights (2011), as Zygota
- Brief Guide To A Happy Life (2012), as Anya
- The Dark Side of the Moon (2016), as Victoria Alyabyeva
- Jumpman (2018), as Oksana
- Quiet Comes the Dawn (2019), as Lilya
- Conference (2020), as Larisa
- Survivors (2021), as Dr. Marina Lavrova
- The Flood (2022), as Sophia
- The Telki (2022), as Rita

Music video

- Slava: Tell Me, Mom (2013)

== Awards and nominations ==
Jumpman (2018)

- Kinotavr for Best Actress (won)
- Russian Guild of Film Critics for Best Actress (nominated)
