= White Snow =

- Theatrical release poster
- Directed by: Nikolay Khomeriki
- Written by: Timur Khvan; Marat Kim; Tatyana Guryanova; Aleksandr Guryanov; Andrey Kureichik
- Produced by: Timur Khvan; Aleksey Ryazantsev; Marat Kim; Ulyana Savelyeva; Pavel Loginov; Nadezhda Churkina
- Starring: Olga Lerman; Fyodor Dobronravov; Nadezhda Markina; Anna Ukolova; Aleksandr Ustyugov; Mikhail Bespalov; Darya Ekamasova
- Cinematography: Fedor Lyass
- Music by: Aleksey Aygi
- Production company: EGO Production
- Distributed by: KaroRental
- Release dates: December 2020 (Window to Europe); March 4, 2021 (Russia)
- Running time: 127 minutes
- Country: Russia
- Language: Russian
- Box office: ₽>55.4 million; ~$1 million

White Snow (Russian: Белый снег, romanized: Bely sneg) is a 2020 Russian biographical sports drama film directed by Nikolay Khomeriki. The film is based on events that happened at the 1997 FIS Cross-Country World Cup. For the first time in the history of the competition, a skier Yelena Välbe played by Olga Lerman won five out of five gold medals in all events entered. The film theatrically released on March 4, 2021 by KaroRental.

== Plot ==
The film tells about a girl named Lena Trubitsyna from Magadan, Soviet Union, who participates in the World Ski Championships.

Returning the awards to Russia, Välbe goes on a tour of Norway. There she learns more about the Norwegian monarchy, as she is interested in the history of the royal family. The king learns about Välbe in Norway and invites her to the royal palace. The conversation is about the merits of skiing. The king is a ski enthusiast and invites Välbe to coach the Norwegian ski team. Välbe suddenly remembers the whole past through a flashback that starts from the very beginning and ends with a momentous day in Trondheim.

== Cast ==
- Olga Lerman as Yelena Välbe (also tr. Elena Vyalbe), a Soviet and Russian cross-country skier
  - Angelina Välbe as Yelena 'Lena' Trubitsyna, 8 years old
  - Polina Vataga as Yelena 'Lena' Trubitsyna, 14 years old
- Fyodor Dobronravov as Viktor, grandfather
- Nadezhda Markina as Militsa, grandmother
- Anna Ukolova as Yelena's mother
- Aleksandr Ustyugov as Maksimych, instructor
- Mikhail Bespalov as Trubitsyn, a taxi driver
- Darya Ekamasova as Irina Makarova
- Anna Kotova as Larisa Lazutina
- Vadim Andreyev as Petr
- Dmitriy Podnozov as Grushin
- Aleksander Gorbatov as Yuriy 'Yura'
- Polina Chernyshova as Nina Gavrylyuk
- Ekaterina Ageeva as Olga Danilova
- Aleksandr Klyukvin as Zharov, a sports commentator
- Vladimir Kapustin as Voronin
- Natalya Tereshkova as Tamara Tikhonova
- Lasse Lindberg as King of Norway
- Johan Elm as Urmas Välbe (also tr. Urmas Vyalbe)
- Stepan Rival as Franz
- Artyom Eshkin as Ilya
- Mariya Bystrova as Trude Dybendahl
- Odd Helge Brugrand as Norwegian policeman

== Production ==
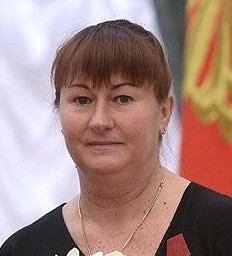
Yelena Välbe was awarded the medal of the Order "For Merit to the Fatherland", I class.

The concept of the film is a biopic set in the winter ski mountains of Russia and Estonia. The filmmakers presented a film about records in cross-country skiing by the Russian athlete Yelena Välbe. Since February 1997, at Granåsen Ski Centre in Trondheim, Norway, at the FIS Nordic World Ski Championships 1997, a woman won gold in all five cross-country skiing competitions.

From the production of the film company EGO Production - White Snow is a retelling of events, permission for which was given by Vyalbe herself. Today Välbe is the president of the All-Russian public organization "Russian Ski Racing Federation", head of the Russian Ski Sports Association, multiple world and Olympic champion. When White Snow was in production, Välbe provided support at all stages of filming, including script adjustments and advice to actresses who played challenging roles in real-life skiing conditions.

=== Filming ===
Principal photography began in 2020, the film was shot in the ski mountains of Magadan, Moscow, Russia and Tallinn, Pärnu, Estonia.

== Release ==
White Snow was the opening film of the 18th international festival "Window to Europe Film Festival". The event took place in December 2020 in the town of Vyborg. In total, the competition program included eleven full-length feature films. The film premiered in Russia on March 4, 2021, the Russian distributor is the film company "KaroRental".
