= AK-47 (2020 film) =

2020 Russian film

- Theatrical release poster
- Directed by: Konstantin Buslov
- Written by: Anatoliy Usov; Sergei Bodrov; Aleksey Borodachyov
- Produced by: Konstantin Buslov; Sergei Bodrov
- Starring: Yura Borisov; Olga Lerman; Artur Smolyaninov; Valery Barinov; Anatoly Lobotsky
- Cinematography: Levan Kapanadze
- Edited by: Margarita Smirnova
- Music by: Sergei Stern
- Production companies: R.B. Productions; Etalon-Film
- Distributed by: Megogo Distribution
- Release date: February 21, 2020 (Russia)
- Running time: 110 minutes
- Country: Russia
- Language: Russian
- Budget: ₽200 million
- Box office: ₽117 million $1,625,986

AK-47 (Russian: Калашников, romanized: Kalashnikov) is a 2020 Russian biographical film about the experiences of Mikhail Kalashnikov, inventor of the AK-47 assault rifle.

Elena Kalashnikova, the designer's daughter and a consultant to the Kalashnikov Concern, took part in the production of the film. The film was directed by Konstantin Buslov, and stars Yura Borisov, Olga Lerman, Artur Smolyaninov, and Eldar Kalimulin.

The premiere took place in Russia on February 20, 2020, by Megogo Distribution.

== Plot ==
The film begins with a sequence (supplemented by subsequent flashbacks) in which Mikhail Kalashnikov, a young farmer's son from Altai, is seen secretly working on a functional toy rifle. In 1941 the adult Kalashnikov is serving as a tank commander in the Red Army during World War II and is seriously wounded in the Battle of Bryansk while engaging a German anti-tank gun. While being evacuated, he witnesses a companion's encounter with a group of German soldiers in which his new submachine gun jams due to design faults.

On his way home, Kalashnikov visits Matai Station in Alma-Ata, Kazakhstan, where he was dismissed from an engineering position for using depot resources to build private weapon designs. His former superior, Pavel Krotov, refuses to let him assemble a new design inspired by his war experience. Kalashnikov gets approval from a passing high-ranking officer named Basarov and successfully assembles a new submachine gun with the aid of the Station's personnel. He is arrested presenting it to Basarov, but the officer admires the gun's innovative design and has it evaluated. Kalashnikov is released and presents his gun to General Pavel Kurbatkin, the district commander of Central Asia, who approves him for a national arms design competition.

Kalashnikov is sent to Golutvin, the Shchurov arms testing facility, to compete against prestigious arms designers like Alexey Sudayev and Sergei Korovin. He also meets Ekaterina Moiseeva, a female design assistant and his future wife. While his weapon ultimately loses to Sudayev's gun, he is given permission to work on new designs with the encouragement of his friends. By war's end Kalashnikov has a new automatic rifle ready and is sent to the Kovrov Arms Factory to improve on it. Impatient to see if it works, and denied a test at the firing range, he conducts his own successful trial, and is arrested for testing in the open without authorization. General Vasily Degtyaryov, a notable arms designer whom Kalashnikov considers his fiercest competitor, expresses his sincere respect for Kalashnikov's talent and the superiority of his design, and removes himself from the competition. Kalashnikov's gun passes the government's tryout and field testing, and in 1949 is approved for mass production. Kalashnikov is decorated and given an extended leave of absence to visit his family at his home farm.

== Cast ==
- Yura Borisov as Mikhail Kalashnikov
- Olga Lerman as Ekaterina 'Katya' Moiseyeva
- Artur Smolyaninov as Captain Vasily Lyutyy
- Eldar Kalimulin as Aleksandr Zaitsev
- Vitaly Khaev as Major General Pavel Kurbatkin
- Valery Barinov as Major General Vasily Degtyaryov
- Anatoly Lobotsky as Colonel Glukhov
- Aleksey Vertkov as Captain Lobov, NKVD
- Dmitry Bogdan as Major Alexey Sudayev
- Maksim Bityukov as Kazakov
- Armen Arushanyan as Saakyants
- Valery Afanasiev as Chief Marshal Nikolai Voronov
- Sergey Gazarov as Pavel Krotov
- Seydulla Moldakhanov as Lieutenant Colonel Basarov
- Dmitry Kulichkov as Major Lebedev
- Igor Khripunov as deputy Degtyarev
- Yuriy Loparyov as Kuzmich
- Aleksandr Nikolsky as uncle Misha
- Mikhail Gudoshnikov as Kravchenko
- Yevgeniy Antropov as lieutenant in Alma-Ata
- Amadu Mamadakov as guard in Alma-Ata

== Production ==
The lead actor Yura Borisov emphasizes that he actively studied the life path of his character, engaged in the search and collection of alternative sources, wishing to realize the complexity of the character of the gunsmith with his complexes and reflections. According to Borisov, he personally saw Kalashnikov, and when he passed by, “something directly flew out of him and flew to me! And then I walked around the site with it”.

=== Filming ===
Work on the film began in August 2018, filming was carried out, including in the Apraksins' Estate, Dmitrovsky District, Moscow Oblast, in the Republic of Crimea, in the town of Torzhok, Torzhoksky District, Tver Oblast and Shushary near Saint Petersburg, scenes with locomotives were filmed. In addition, locomotives were involved in large numbers in the Locomotive Depot of the Podmoskovnaya station when filming scenes at Matai Station (Kazakhstan Temir Zholy), where Kalashnikov began working on his first submachine gun.

Costumes and props were provided by Mosfilm Studios; they also supported in the dubbing and recording of sound. The scene of the Bryansk tank battle was filmed at the Voyenfilm cinema complex near Medyn, Medynsky District, Kaluga Oblast, using the scenery of the painting "Ilinsky frontier".

All models of weapons developed by Kalashnikov were specially restored according to drawings received from the Military Historical Museum of Artillery, Engineers and Signal Corps in St. Petersburg.

== Release ==
On February 15, 2020, a special screening of the film took place in the city of Izhevsk. The film was theatrically released in the Russian Federation on February 20, 2020, by Megogo Distribution.
