= Ivan Tverdovskiy =

Russian film director and screenwriter

- Born: Ivan Ivanovich Tverdovskiy; December 29, 1988 (age 36); Moscow, Soviet Union (now Russia)
- Citizenship: Russian Federation
- Occupation(s): film director, screenwriter

Ivan Ivanovich Tverdovskiy (Russian: Ива́н Ива́нович Твердовский; born December 29, 1988, Moscow) is a Russian film director and screenwriter. Laureate of the Karlovy Vary International Film Festival. He participated in the Venice International Film Festival (section Giornate degli Autori). Member of the European Film Academy in 2021.

== Filmography ==
- 2007 — Holy Groove (Russian: Святая канавка)
- 2008 — In Active Search (Russian: В активном поиске)
- 2009 — Like Waiting For A Bus (Russian: Словно жду автобуса)
- 2010 — Pain Points (Russian: Болевые точки)
- 2011 — Snow (Russian: Снег)
- 2012 — Pianism (Russian: Пианизм)
- 2013 — Dog Buzz (Russian: Собачий кайф)
- 2014 — Corrections Class (Russian: Класс коррекции)
- 2016 — Zoology (Russian: Зоология)
- 2018 — Jumpman (Russian: Подбросы)
- 2019 — Peaceful Life (Russian: Мирная жизнь)
- 2020 — Conference (Russian: Конференция)
- 2022 — Lyusya (Russian: Люся)
- 2022 — Hypocrisy (Russian: Кликушество)
- 2022 — The Flood (Russian: Наводнение)
