= Andrei Kravchuk =

Russian film director (born 1962)

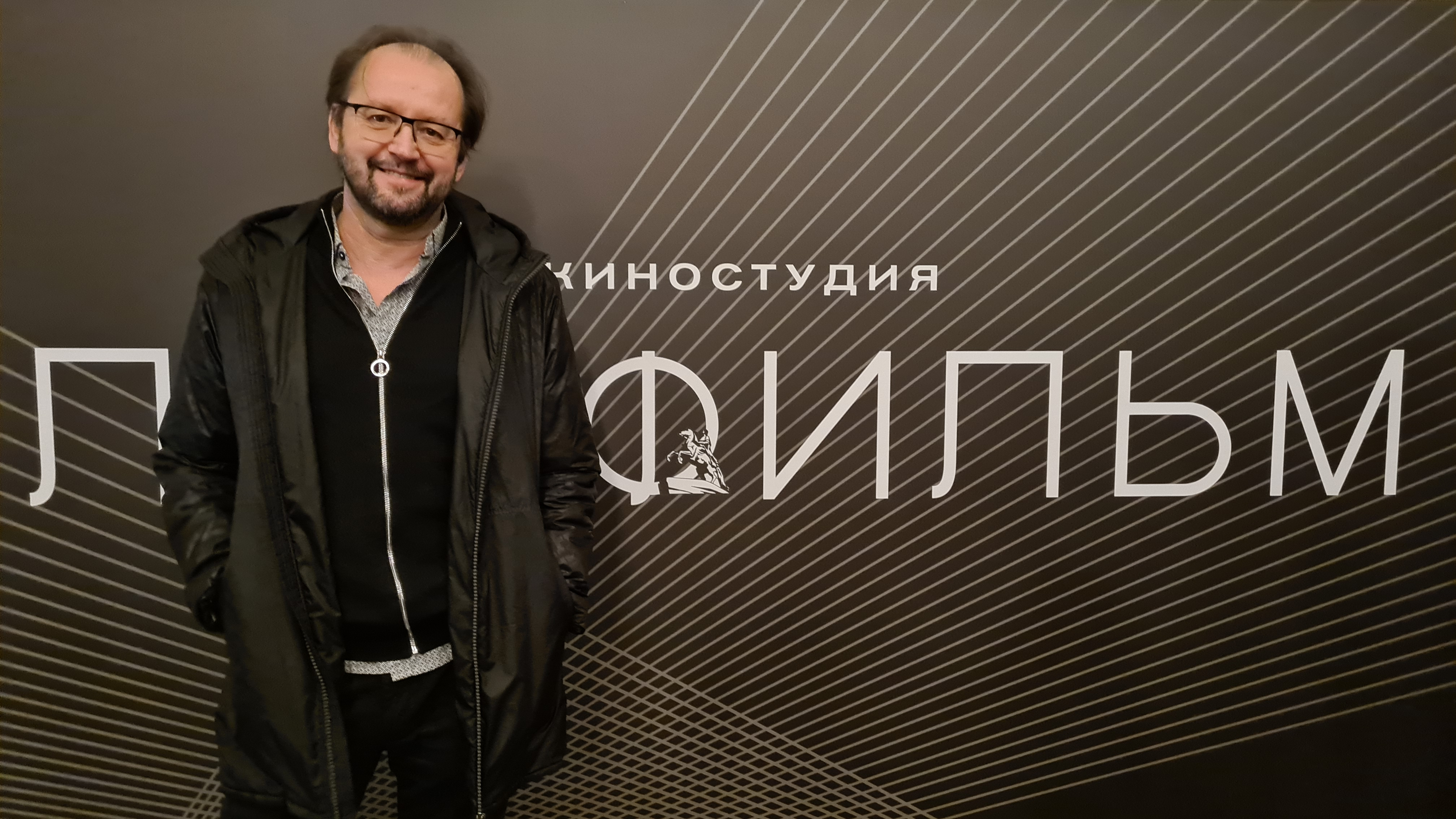
Kravchuk in 2022

Andrei Yurievich Kravchuk (Russian: Андре́й Ю́рьевич Кравчу́к; born 13 April 1962 in Leningrad) is a Russian television and film director and screenwriter best known for his films The Italian (2005) and Admiral (2008).

== Career ==
Kravchuk had almost completed his master's thesis in mathematics when he met filmmakers Aleksei German and Vladimir Vengerov and German found him a job as an assistant to director Yefim Gribov shooting We Are Going to America in 1992. By the end of filming, Kravchuk had decided to give up mathematics and become a filmmaker, and he was admitted to the Saint Petersburg State Institute of Film and Television. After graduating, he worked in Russian television, saying, "Television today in Russia is the most accessible path to professional filmmaking." Between 1992 and 2001, he wrote and directed: the films Indonesiia – lubov’ moya (Indonesia, My Love), Otbleski i Teni (Reflections and Shadows), Vecher i Utro (Evening and Morning) and Rozhdestvenskaya Misteriya (The Christmas Miracle); the documentaries Deti v Strane Reform (Children in the Country of Reforms), Tamozhnya (Customs) and Marlen Shpindler; and episodes of the television series Ulitsa razbitykh fonarei (Streets of Broken Streetlights) and the television miniseries Agent Natsional’noi Bezopasnosti (Agent of National Security). In 2002, he directed the film Chernyi Voron (Black Raven) and the documentary Semyon Aranovich: Poslednii Kadr (Semyon Aranovich: The Final Shot), which was a tribute to documentary filmmaker Semyon Aranovich, whom he had learnt under at the Institute of Cinema and Television.

When the Russian economy collapsed in 1999 and many orphaned children were forced to live on the streets, screenwriter Andrei Romanov approached Kravchuk with a newspaper article about an orphan who taught himself to read so he could find his birth mother. The two started collaborating in 2000 and Kravchuk, who had earlier made a short documentary about orphanages, decided to adapt the story into a film, Italianetz (The Italian).

== Personal life ==
Kravchuk's father was a navy engineer and his mother a doctor, and he is married to a designer with two young sons.

== Filmography ==
Feature films

- The Christmas Miracle (2000)
- The Italian (2005)
- Admiral (2008)
- Viking (2016)
- Union of Salvation (2019)
- Palmira (2022)
- Peter I: The Last Tsar and the First Emperor (2022)

Television

- Streets of Broken Lights (1999)
- National Security Agent (2001)
- Black Raven (2002)
- Gentlemen Officers (2004)
- The Admiral (2009)
