= Maxim Shchyogolev =

Russian actor

- Максим Щёголев
- Born: Maxim Valerievich Shchyogolev; 20 April 1982 (age 44); Voronezh, Russian SFSR, Soviet Union
- Occupation: Actor
- Years active: 2001-present
- Awards: Medal "For Strengthening Military Cooperation" (Ministry of Defense)
- Website: shegolevmaxim.ru

Maxim Valerievich Shchyogolev (Russian: Макси́м Вале́рьевич Щёголев, also tr. Maksim Valerievich Shchyogolev; born 20 April 1982) is a popular Russian theatre and film actor, best known for roles in criminal and romantic movies and serials like Karpov (2012), The Second Breath (2008), which earned him a Russian Army "Fighters' Brotherhood" Medal, and The Lone Wolf, 2012. In 2011 he received the Golden Rhino Award for the Best male supporting role in the film Marriage at Will (2011).

== Biography ==
Maxim Shchyogolev was born in Voronezh, to Valery Konstantinovich Shchyogolev, a Soviet Army officer, and Irina Alexandrovna, a doctor. He excelled at school and after the graduation joined the Drama faculty of the Voronezh State Academy of Arts. Here, as a first year student, he was noticed by the Moscow Luna Theatre's director Sergey Prokhanov who invited him to join his own troupe and transferred him to his own class in Russian Academy of Theatre Arts. In 2003, after the graduation, Shchyogolev joined the Moscow Art Theatre's Anatoly Vasilyev-led Drama Art studio, to study there under the supervision of the guest directors, Jerzy Grotowski and Thomas Richards.

== Career ==
In 2001-2005 Shchyogolev was cast in several small (mostly, villainous) parts in films. Then came the 150-series long TV criminal drama The Young and the Angry (2006) where he starred in the leading part of Demidov. It was followed by the Second Breath (2008), for which he received the Fighters Brotherhood medal. Several more serials, including One Day (2008), Girl Hunters (2011), I Will Come Myself (2012) and The Lone Wolf (2013), further cemented his reputation of one of the leading Russian actors of his generation.

== Private life ==
In the early 2000s Maxim Shchyogolev had the relationship with the actress Tatyana Solntseva; in 2002 their son Ilya was born. Then Shchyogolev married the actress Alla Kazakova; they have two daughters, Maria (b. 2007) and Ekaterina (b. 2008).

== Selected filmography ==
- 2001 - Under the North Star
- 2002 - Shoemaker
- 2004-2013 - Kulagin and Partners
- 2004 - Moscow Saga
- 2006 - Night express (Short) as He
- 2006 - The First Circle (miniseries) as torturer, episode
- 2006 - Soldiers 6
- 2006 - Who's the Boss? (TV Series) as Andrey
- 2006 - The Young and the Angry as Aleksandr Demidov
- 2007 - The Moon Theatre, or Space fool 13.28
- 2008 - One Day as Aleksey
- 2008 - Second Breath as Yuriy Yulev / "Elephant"
- 2009-2010 - Carmelita. Gypsy passion (TV Series) as Stanislav Zhdanov
- 2009 - City attractions (TV Series) as Roman Parov
- 2009 - Barvikha (TV Series) as bartender
- 2009 - Everything you need - it's love (TV Series) as Denis
- 2010 - Lawyer 7 (TV Series) as Krasilnikov
- 2010 - Marriage as a bequest as Andrey Tikhomirov
- 2011 - Declared wanted list (TV Series) as Petr Volgin
- 2011 - Bombila (TV Series) as Ignat
- 2011 - Hiromant 2 (TV series) as Roman Belkin
- 2011 - Girl Hunters (TV series) as Georgiy Volkov, General Director
- 2011 - Secrets of Palace Revolutions as chanter Alexei Razumovsky
- 2012 - Sklifosovsky (TV series) as Anton
- 2012 - I Will Come Myself (TV series) as Oleg
- 2012 - Karpov (TV Series) as Vadim Melnikov
- 2012 - The Lone Wolf (2 (TV series) as Maksim Dobrynin "Wolf"
- 2013 - Puppeteers (Mini-series) as Aleksandr, owner of the club
- 2014 - Anton (Short) as Brother
- 2014 - The cops 2 (TV series) as Yuriy Zozulya, Captain CID
- 2015 - Sword (TV series) as Roman Vinnikov
- 2015 - Molodezhka (TV Series) as Aleksandr Tochilin, head coach of "Titana"
