= Aleksandr Klyukvin =

- Александр Клюквин
- Born: 26 April 1956 (age 70); Irkutsk, Soviet Union
- Awards: Order "For Merit in Culture and Art"; Merited Artist of the Russian Federation; People's Artist of Russia

Alexander Vladimirovich Klyukvin (Russian: Александр Владимирович Клюквин; born 26 April 1956 in Irkutsk) is a Soviet and Russian theater and film actor, voice actor, narrator, and announcer; He holds a number of state awards including Merited Artist of the Russian Federation (1993), People's Artist of the Russian Federation (2004), and recipient of the Russian Federation Government Award (2008).

== Biography ==
He was born on 26 April 1956 into the family of a military serviceman and a teacher. In the early 1970s, his father served in Syria as a military advisor.

His development as an actor was sparked by a school KVN (comedy competition) performance; as a tenth-grader, he played the role of the middle head of Zmey Gorynych (a three-headed dragon). Later, he performed a reading of Mikhail Zoshchenko's The Bathhouse* at a school event.

After graduating from high school in 1973, he worked for a time as a motorcycle assembly fitter on the production line at the Degtyaryov Plant in the city of Kovrov. He also spent nine months working as a stagehand at the Moscow Art Theatre (MKhAT).

His first mentor in the craft was Mikhail Yuryevich Romanenko-Kushkovsky—a set designer, actor, and educator—with whom Klyukvin studied before entering drama school and whom he continued to visit for many years afterward.

In 1978, he graduated from the Mikhail Shchepkin Higher Theatre School —affiliated with the State Academic Maly Theatre where he studied under Mikhail Tsaryov. He was subsequently accepted into the Maly Theatre's troupe, where he remains a member to this day.

He entered the field of dubbing by chance. While a Maly Theatre production featuring him was being filmed at the Ostankino Technical Center, a fellow actor, Dmitry Nazarov, approached him during a break and suggested he participate in dubbing the animated series Maya the Bee and DuckTales; he voiced minor roles in both. Later, he began receiving invitations for other dubbing and voice-over roles. This actor's voice is used for, among others, Bernard Farcy, Robert De Niro, Al Pacino, Lieutenant Columbo (in the ORT dub of the eponymous series), characters from Mexican and Brazilian soap operas, and the talking washbasin in the "Myth" laundry detergent commercial.

He supported Russia's invasion of Ukraine.
