= The Sword Bearer =

- Directed by: Filipp Yankovsky
- Written by: Konstantin Syngaevski; Yevgeni Danilenko
- Starring: Artyom Tkachenko; Chulpan Khamatova; Alexey Gorbunov
- Music by: Igor Vdovin
- Production company: CTB
- Release date: 12 October 2006
- Running time: 108 minutes
- Country: Russia
- Language: Russian

The Sword Bearer (Russian: Меченосец, romanized: Mechenosets) is a 2006 Russian superhero film directed by Filipp Yankovsky, based on Yevgeni Danilenko's book of the same name.

== Plot summary ==
Sasha lives a violent life, and those who pursue him face deadly consequences. As he grows older, he becomes an increasingly potent instrument against injustice, escalating his punishments to match the severity of the crimes.

Gradually Sasha becomes too dangerous to live among people, and one day the entire world revolts against him. He possesses a supernatural power, enabling him to destroy everything on his way. SHE makes her sudden appearance on his way. Ignorant of his supernatural powers, she falls in love with him.

== Cast ==
- Artyom Tkachenko as Sasha
- Chulpan Khamatova as Katya
- Alexey Gorbunov as Klim
- Tatyana Lyutaeva as Bella
- Leonid Gromov as Roshin
- Aleksei Zharkov as father
- Nadezhda Markina as Sasha's mother
