= Central Partnership =

Russian film company

- Logo used since 2023
- Type: Public joint stock company, Subsidiary
- Industry: Motion pictures
- Founded: 6 March 1996
- Founder: Ruben Dishdishyan
- Headquarters: Moscow, Russia
- Key people: Vadim Vereshchagin (CEO)
- Owner: Gazprom-Media
- Parent: Gazprom OJSC
- Website: centpart.ru In English

Central Partnership (Russian: Централ Партнершип) is a Russian film distribution and production company founded in 1996. The distributor was acquired by Russian gas company Gazprom in 2014.

== History ==
Central Partnership started as a TV content distributor from 1996 until 2000. Central Partnership also produces high-end TV series. Central Partnership is promoting the Russian titles overseas. In November 2005, the controlling stake of Central Partnership was acquired by Prof Media.

In January 2009, Central Partnership became an official distributor of the Paramount Pictures lineup in Russia and the Commonwealth of Independent States (excluding Ukraine). In May 2012, CP signed a contract with DreamWorks Animation to release their television and films in Russia. Shrek Forever After, an animated comedy blockbuster by DreamWorks Animation, became the highest-grossing animation of all time in Russia. The deal halted after February 2022.

In November 2016, CP also handled the marketing in Russia for the some films from the catalog of Indian film company Eros International.

In March 2023, the company announced the development of a Russian equivalent of the IMAX format, CosMAX. The technology delivers the sharpest, most saturated images, as well as deep, detailed sound. The first film to be shown in the new format will be "The Challenge".

== Library ==
- On the Nameless Height (2004)
- Shadowboxing (2005)
- The Master and Margarita (2005)
- Volkodav from the Grey Hound Clan (2006)
- Young Volkodav (2006–2007)
- 1612 (2007)
- The Sovereign's Servant (2007)
- You and I (2008)
- Captive (2008)
- Taras Bulba (2009)
- Sherlock Holmes (2013)
- Legend of Kolovrat (2017)
- Going Vertical (2017)
- Text (2019)
- Son of a Rich (2019)
- Billion (2019)
- The Blackout (2019)
- The Ninth (2019)
- T-34 (2019)
- (NOT)The Ideal Man (2019)
- Hero (2019)
- The Last Frontier (2020)
- Streltsov (2020)
- Fire (2020)
- On the Edge (2020)
- The Silver Skates (2020)
- Doctor Liza (2020)
- The Widow (2020)
- Baba Yaga: Terror of the Dark Forest (2020)
- Anybody Seen My Girl? (2020)
- Zoya (2020)
- White Snow (2020)
- Chernobyl (2021)
- Mission «Sky» (2021)
- Row 19 (2021)
- Dark Spell (2021)
- The Ice Demon (2021)
- The Pilot: A Battle for Survival (2021)
- Ostap Bender Trilogy (2021)
  - Bender: The Beginning (2021)
  - Bender: Gold of the Empire (2021)
  - Bender: The Last Scam (2021)
- In Limbo (2021)
- 100 minutes (2021)
- The World Champion (2021)
- The Everlasting Story (2021)
- Metro 2033 (2021)
- Like a Man (2022)
- First Oscar (2022)
- Mr. Knockout (2022)
- Nika (2022)
- Who's There? (2022)
- Shadow (2022)
- Oxygen (2022)
- Tzadik (2023)
- Rat-Catcher (2023)
- Baba Yaga (2023)
- Jane Not Sane (2023)
- Emergency Landing (2023)
- Little Nina & The Piano Thieves (2023)
- Lord of the Wind (2023)
- The Bremen Town Musicians (2023)
- The Challenge (2023)
- Peter I: The Last Tsar and the First Emperor (2023)
- Syndrome (2023)
- The Empresses (2023)
- White Road (2023)
- Son of a Rich 2 (2024)
- Adam & Eve (2024)
- Look at Me! (2024)
- Extraordinary (2024)
- Guest from the Future (2024)
- Love&Art (2024)
- My Wild Friend (2024)
- The Summer of Our Love (2024)
- Lottery (2024)
- The Last Ronin (2024)
- Project "Prometheus" (2024)
- The North Pole (2024)
- Catherine the Great (2025)
- The Poet (2025)
- The Wizard of the Emerald City: Part I (2025)
- Philip Rules (2025)
- My Deer Boy (2025)
- The Dino Family (2025)
- Rowing for Gold (2025)
- DOWN (2025)
- KRAKEN (2025)
- Virtual Assistant (2025)
- YOU'RE FIRED (2026)
- The Wizard of the Emerald City: Part II (2027)

=== Distribution rights ===
- Paramount Pictures from 2009 to 2022
- Lionsgate from 2016 to 2022
- Summit Entertainment from 2016 to 2018
