= List of Russian films of 2020 =

A list of films produced in Russia in 2020 (see 2020 in film).

== Film releases ==
Opening		Title	Russian title	Cast and crew	Details
J A N U A R Y	1	Invasion	Вторжение	Director: Fyodor Bondarchuk; Cast: Irina Starshenbaum, Rinal Mukhametov, Alexander Petrov, Yuri Borisov, Oleg Menshikov, Sergei Garmash, Yevgeny Mikheev	Walt Disney Studios Sony Pictures Releasing (WDSSPR); Previous film, Attraction (2017).
J A N U A R Y	16	(UN) Ideal Man	(НЕ)идеальный мужчина	Director: Marius Balchunas; Cast: Egor Kreed, Yuliya Aleksandrova, Roman Kurtsyn	Selling robots has become an integral part of our lives, a robot lover and an ideal man.
J A N U A R Y	23	The Marathon of Desires	Марафон желаний	Director: Dasha Charusha; Cast: Aglaya Tarasova, Kirill Nagiev, Makar Zaporozhskiy	
J A N U A R Y	30	Coma	Кома	Director: Nikita Argunov; Cast: Rinal Mukhametov, Lyubov Aksyonova, Anton Pampushnyy, Milos Bikovic	The film is already compared to such Hollywood hits as Inception.
J A N U A R Y	30	Sabre Dance	Танец с саблями	Director: Yusup Razykov; Cast: Ambartsum Kabanyan, Aleksandr Ilyin Jr.	Magic Film Company; Based on the Sabre Dance
F E B R U A R Y	6	A Russian Youth	Мальчик русский	Director: Alexander Zolotukhin; Cast: Vladimir Korolev, Mikhail Buturlov, Danil Tyabin	
F E B R U A R Y	14	Ice 2	Лёд 2	Director: Zhora Kryzhovnikov; Cast: Aglaya Tarasova, Alexander Petrov, Mariya Aronova, Vitaliya Korniyenko, Nadezhda Mikhalkova, Yulia Khlynina, Sergey Lavygin	Sony Pictures Productions and Releasing (SPPR); Narrated in the original film Ice (2018 film)
F E B R U A R Y	20	AK-47	Калашников	Director: Konstantin Buslov; Cast: Yuri Borisov, Olga Lerman, Artur Smolyaninov, Eldar Kalimulin, Vitaly Khaev, Valery Barinov, Anatoly Lobotsky, Aleksey Vertkov	Megogo Distribution; Whose surname became known all over the world thanks to the legendary AK-47 assault rifle.
F E B R U A R Y	27	Baba Yaga: Terror of the Dark Forest	Яга. Кошмар тёмного леса	Director: Svyatoslav Podgaevskiy; Cast: Oleg Chugunov, Glasha Golubeva, Artyom Zhigulin, Svetlana Ustinova, Maryana Spivak	Central Partnership
F E B R U A R Y	27	On the Moon	На Луне	Director: Egor Konchalovsky; Cast: Ivan Arkhangelsky, Vitali Kishchenko, Aleksandr Baluev	
F E B R U A R Y	27	Winter	Зима	Director: Sergey Chernikov; Cast: Alexander Petrov, Igor Petrenko, Timofey Tribuntsev	Ten Letters
M A R C H	5	Hotel Belgrade	Отель «Белград»	Director: Konstantin Statskiy; Cast: Miloš Biković, Diana Pozharskaya, Boris Dergachev, Aleksandra Kuzenkina, Egor Koreshkov, Ljubomir Bandović, Jelisaveta Orašanin	Central Partnership; Films based on television series Hotel Eleon and Grand.
M A R C H	5	One Breath	Один вдох	Director: Elena Hazanova; Cast: Viktoriya Isakova, Maksim Sukhanov, Vladimir Yaglych, Philip Ershov, Stasya Miloslavskaya, Sergey Sosnovsky, Vladislav Vetrov, Artyom Tkachenko	

Opening		Title	Russian title	Cast and crew	Details
A P R I L	23	Sputnik	Спутник	Director: Egor Abramenko; Cast: Oksana Akinshina, Pyotr Fyodorov, Fyodor Bondarchuk, Anton Vasiliev, Vitaliya Korniyenko, Aleksey Demidov, Aleksandr Marushev, Pavel Ustinov	The film will be released on digital rental. Schedule for digital releases at More.tv online cinema, Wink.rt.ru video service and Ivi.ru online cinema. (in Russian)
M A Y	14	Strangers of Patience	Странники терпенья	Director: Vladimir Alenikov; Cast: Konstantin Lavronenko, Maya Shopa	

Opening		Title	Russian title	Cast and crew	Details
A U G U S T	1	Fairy	Фея	Director: Anna Melikyan; Cast: Konstantin Khabenskiy	
A U G U S T	1	Good as New	Хэппи-энд	Director: Yevgeny Shelyakin; Cast: Mikhail Gomiashvili	
A U G U S T	6	The Time Guardians	Ключ времени	Director: Alexey Telnov; Cast: Ksenia Alekseeva, Pavel Trubiner, Lyubov Tolkalina, Artyom Tkachenko	Magic Film Company / Lendoc
A U G U S T	20	Shadow of a Star	Тень звезды	Director: Aleksey Nikolaev; Cast: Pavel Priluchny, Aleksandra Cherkasova-Sluzhitel	
A U G U S T	27	Cosmoball	Вратарь Галактики	Director: Dzhanik Fayziev; Cast: Yevgeny Romantsov, Viktoriya Agalakova, Maria Lisovaya, Ivan Ivanovich, Liza Taychenacheva, Yevgeny Mironov, Elena Yakovleva	Superheroes is a fantastic action game about an evolved man who gains superpowers and gets into the interplanetary team assembled to fight the space villains. Their games resemble football tournament – however, with the rates of universal scale.
S E P T E M B E R	24	Space Dogs: Caribbean Mystery	Белка и Стрелка. Карибская тайна	Director: Inna Evlannikova; Voice cast: Yevgeny Mironov, Irina Pegova, Yulia Peresild	From Russia's first 3D animation studio, Space Dogs: Caribbean Mystery is a tropical Caribbean sea mystery animated adventure featuring Soviet commands Belka and Strelka.
S E P T E M B E R	24	Streltsov	Стрельцов	Director: Ilya Uchitel; Cast: Alexander Petrov, Stasya Miloslavskaya, Aleksandr Yatsenko, Vitaliy Khaev, Viktor Dobronravov, Nadezhda Markina, Aleksey Morozov	

Opening		Title	Russian title	Cast and crew	Details
O C T O B E R	1	Russkiy Reyd	Русский рейд	Director: Denis Kryuchkov; Cast: Ivan Kotik, Alexandr Krasovsky, Ilya Antonenko	
O C T O B E R	22	Deeper!	Глубже!	Director: Mikhail Segal; Cast: Aleksandr Pal, Lyubov Aksyonova, Oleg Gaas	Sony Pictures Productions and Releasing (SPPR)
O C T O B E R	22	Doctor Lisa	Доктор Лиза	Director: Oksana Karas; Cast: Chulpan Khamatova, Andrzej Chyra, Andrey Burkovsky	
O C T O B E R	29	The Widow	Вдова	Director: Ivan Minin; Cast: Viktoriya Potemina, Anastasiya Gribova	
N O V E M B E R	4	The Last Frontier	Подольские курсанты	Director: Vadim Shmelyov; Cast: Aleksey Bardukov, Yevgeny Dyatlov, Sergey Bezrukov, Daniil Spivakovsky	Central Partnership; The film tells about the feat of the Podolsk cadets of the artillery and infantry schools in October 1941 at the Battle of Moscow.
N O V E M B E R	5	By-effect	Побочный эффект	Director: Aleksey Kazakov; Cast: Alexandra Revenko, Marina Vasilyeva, Semyon Serzin	
N O V E M B E R	12	Dear Comrades!	Дорогие товарищи!	Director: Andrei Konchalovsky; Cast: Julia Vysotskaya, Vladislav Komarov, Andrey Gusev	
N O V E M B E R	19	Deadly Illusions	Смертельные иллюзии	Director: Oleg Asadulin; Cast: Andrey Burkovsky	
N O V E M B E R	19	Run (2020 Russian film)	Бег	Director: Andrey Zagidullin; Cast: Yevgeny Romantsov, Polina Maksimova	
N O V E M B E R	26	Man from Podolsk	Человек из Подольска	Director: Semyon Serzin; Cast: Vadik Korolyov	
N O V E M B E R	26	On the Edge	На острие	Director: Eduard Bordukov; Cast: Svetlana Khodchenkova, Stasya Miloslavskaya, Sergei Puskepalis, Alexey Barabash	Central Partnership
N O V E M B E R	26	Victoria	Виктория	Director: Ural Safin; Cast: Maxim Shchyogolev, Vitaliya Korniyenko, Dmitry Miller, Evgeniya Malakhova	Cinemaus Studio
D E C E M B E R	3	Iliana	Илиана. Верь мне	Director: Vladimir Koyfman; Cast: Ina Barrón, Ivan Bosiljčić, Anna Churina, Viktor Sukhorukov	
D E C E M B E R	3	The Three	Трое	Director: Anna Melikian; Cast: Konstantin Khabensky	
D E C E M B E R	10	Inadequate People 2	Неадекватные люди 2	Director: Roman Karimov; Cast: Ilya Lyubimov, Ingrid Olerinskaya, Yevgeny Tsyganov	MEGOGO Studios; The sequel to the 2010 film Inadequate People.
D E C E M B E R	10	The Silver Skates	Серебряные коньки	Director: Michael Lockshin; Cast: Fedor Fedotov, Sofya Priss, Kirill Zaytsev, Yuri Borisov, Aleksei Guskov, Severija Janusauskaite, Yuri Kolokolnikov, Timofey Tribuntsev, Alexandra Revenko, Vasily Kopeikin, Sergey Koltakov	Central Partnership / Netflix; The romantic fairy tale is a modern retelling of "Tristan and Isolde" and "Romeo and Juliet", which takes place on ice skates in Saint Petersburg during Christmas winter, and a magical love story from the XIX and XX centuries. The film is based on the famous novel of the same name by the American writer.
D E C E M B E R	17	Feedback	Обратная связь	Director: Aleksey Nuzhnyy; Cast: Aleksandr Demidov, Leonid Barats, Anastasiya Ukolova	
D E C E M B E R	24	Fire	Огонь	Director: Aleksey Nuzhnyy; Cast: Ivan Yankovskiy, Stasya Miloslavskaya, Anton Bogdanov, Viktor Dobronravov, Roman Kurtsyn, Tikhon Zhiznevsky, Irina Gorbacheva	Central Partnership; The film is a disaster, real rescuers and firefighters from the Aerial Forest Protection Service "Avialesookhrana".
D E C E M B E R	31	Horse Julius and Big Horse Racing	Конь Юлий и большие скачки	Director: Darina Schmidt, Konstantin Feoktistov; Voice cast: Dmitry Vysotsky, Sergei Makovetsky, Sergey Burunov	Melnitsa Animation Studio; Spin-off series "The Three Bogatyrs (Three Heroes)" about the horse Julius

=== Culturally Russian films ===
- The Courier is a 2020 historical spy film directed by Dominic Cooke.
- Lost in Russia is a 2020 Chinese comedy film.
- Tenet is a 2020 science fiction action-thriller film directed by Christopher Nolan.
- Welcome to Chechnya is a 2020 documentary film directed by David France.

== See also ==
- 2020 in film
- 2020 in Russia
