= Chuzhie dengi =

- Genre: Crime drama
- Written by: Sergey Minaev; Dmitry Minaev
- Directed by: Igor Tverdokhlebov
- Starring: Maksim Matveyev; Stasya Miloslavskaya; Filipp Yankovsky; Gosha Kutsenko; Aleksandr Mizyov; Linda Lapinsh
- Composer: Aleksandr Vartanov
- No. of seasons: 1
- No. of episodes: 10

Production
- Cinematography: Nikolay Bogachyov

Original release
- Network: Start; Ivi.ru
- Release: 15 May 2025

Chuzhie dengi (Russian: Чужие деньги) is a 2025 Russian crime drama television series directed by Igor Tverdokhlebov. It stars Maksim Matveyev.

== Plot ==
The series tells the story of a cash-out operator named Aleksey Voronov, who escapes and decides to plant a provincial man, Yura, in his place. But things don't go according to plan.

== Cast ==
- Maksim Matveyev as Aleksey Voronov and Yura Afanasyev
- Stasya Miloslavskaya as Alina
- Filipp Yankovsky
- Gosha Kutsenko as Svintsitsky
- Aleksandr Mizyov
- Linda Lapinsh as Yuliya
- Dmitry Astrakhan as Frolov
