= Yanina Studilina =

Russian actress, fashion model and TV presenter (born 1985)

- Янина Студилина
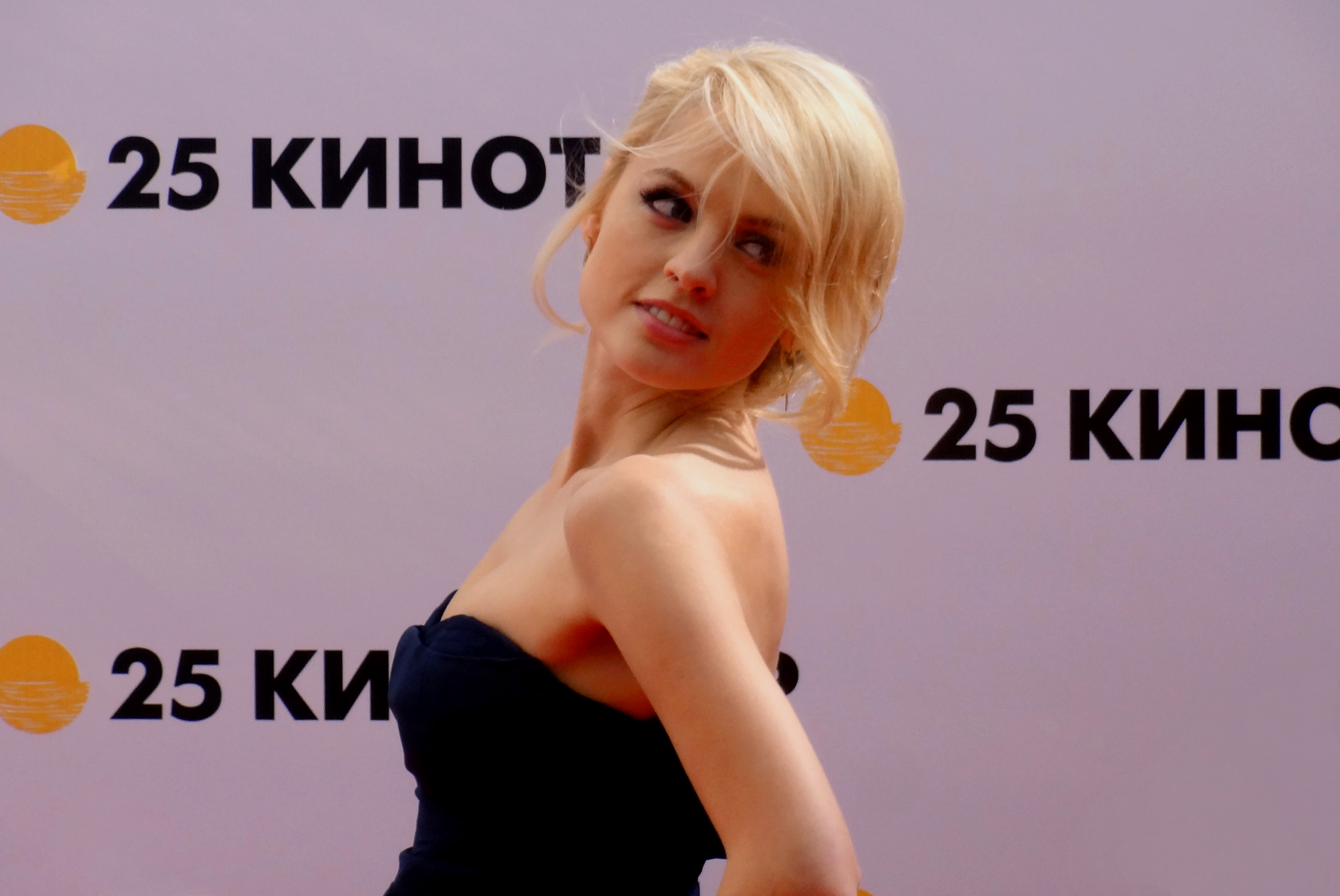
- Yanina Studilina, at the festival Kinotavr, 2014
- Born: Yanina Sergeevna Studilina; 6 August 1985 (age 41); Omsk, RSFSR, USSR
- Occupation: Actress
- Years active: 2000–present

Yanina Sergeevna Studilina (Russian: Яни́на Серге́евна Студи́лина; born 6 August 1985) is a Russian theater and film actress, fashion model, TV presenter.

== Biography ==
Yanina Studilina was born in Omsk, Russian SFSR, Soviet Union. In 2000, she graduated from the theater and music school. In 2011, she graduated from Boris Shchukin Theatre Institute. Gained popularity after the television series Ranetki. She worked at a leading TV channel RU.TV and Russian Travel Guide.

She has been married to Alexander Rodnyansky Jr. since 2008.

== Filmography ==
=== Television ===
- 2006-2007 — Who’s the Boss? as Mila
- 2007 — Picturesque Adventure as Yulia
- 2007 — School N°1 as Kristina
- 2006-2008 — Happy Together as Sveta's girlfriend
- 2008 — Provincial Girl as Yulya
- 2008 — One Night of Love as Polina
- 2008-2010 — Ranetki as Polina Zelenova
- 2009 — Voronin's Family as Alina
- 2009 — Clairvoyant as Yuljka
- 2009 — City of Temptations as Nastya Goncharova
- 2010 — Galygin.ru as Jones
- 2011 — Donut Lucy as Rita ('La Chiqui')
- 2012 — The White Guard as Anyuta
- 2012 — Emergency as Kristina
- 2014 — Turkish Transit as Rita Zvonareva
- 2014 — Alien Life as Zoya Kalashnikova
- 2015 — The Red Queen as Tata Smirnova
- 2016 — Island as Olga Feigus, beautiful and clever girl
- 2018 — Doctor Richter as Svetlana
- 2019 — Return as Lialka, Masha's half-sister
- 2022 — Call Life as Katya
- 2023 — The Adventures of Dennis as Svetlana

=== Film ===
- 2013 — Stalingrad as Masha
- 2014 — Unreal Love as Elena
- 2017 — Dead Trigger as Executive Assistant
- 2018 — American Fright Fest as Tatiana
- 2019 — The Sober Cab as Katya
- 2020 — Star vs Quarantine as fitogoddess
- 2020 — The Babe!/Gorgeous as Anya
- 2021 — Sisters as Elena Kapitanova
- 2022 — Little Ukraine as Anielka
