= Peace! Love! Chewing Gum! =

- Genre: Drama; Crime; Comedy
- Created by: Anton Shchukin
- Written by: Pyotr Vnukov (all seasons); Alexander Belov (all seasons); Aleksey Ivanov (seasons 1–2); Oleg Rashidov (seasons 2–3); Sergey Panasenkov (seasons 2–3); Polina Ryzhova (season 3)
- Directed by: Ilya Aksyonov (season 1); Anton Fyodorov (seasons 2–3)
- Starring: Egor Gubarev; Egor Abramov; Fyodor Roshchin; Valentina Lyapina; Yura Borisov; Ksenia Katalymova; Stepan Devonin; Artur Beschastny
- Country of origin: Russia
- No. of seasons: 3
- No. of episodes: 24

Production
- Executive producers: Natalia Lavrova (season 1); Darya Perunovskaya (seasons 2–3)
- Producers: Anton Shchukin (general); Anton Zaytsev (general); Artyom Loginov (general); Alexander Dulerain (general, seasons 1–2); Alexander Belov (creative); Pyotr Vnukov (creative); Dmitry Pachuliya (season 3); Roman Khromov (season 3); Dmitry Lanskoy (music)
- Cinematography: Aleksey Filippov
- Running time: 42–50 minutes
- Production company: Good Story Media

Original release
- Network: Premier; TNT
- Release: 23 April 2020 – 15 June 2023

Peace! Love! Chewing Gum! (Russian: Мир! Дружба! Жвачка!, romanized: Mir! Druzhba! Zhvachka!, lit. Peace! Friendship! Chewing Gum!) is a Russian coming-of-age drama television series set during “The wild nineties”. The series was produced by Good Story Media. Its working title was Brotherhood of the Roof.

The digital premiere took place on 23 April 2020 on the streaming service Premier. The television premiere aired on TNT on 18 May 2020.

On 29 October 2020, the series was renewed for a second season. The second season premiered on 24 May 2021.

Filming of the third season began on 15 July 2022., and the season premiered on 4 May 2023

On 12 December 2023, the series was officially renewed for a fourth season, but production was cancelled in July 2024.

== Plot ==
=== Season 1 (2020) ===
In 1993, teenager Sanya Ryabinin meets a neighbor girl, Zhenya, and is drawn into the turbulent reality of the Russian 1990s. Together with his friends Vovka and Ilyusha, he faces the challenges of growing up amid crime and moral dilemmas.

=== Season 2 (2021) ===
Set in 1994, Sanya awaits Zhenya's return from Germany. Family tensions escalate, old enemies resurface, and the consequences of the previous season unfold.

=== Season 3 (2023) ===
Set in 1996, Sanya graduates from school. Criminal conflicts intensify, personal relationships shift, and the characters confront adulthood as the story reaches its conclusion.

== Cast ==
Actor	Role
Egor Gubarev	Alexander “Sanya” Ryabinin
Egor Abramov	Vladimir “Vovka” Lukin
Fyodor Roshchin	Ilya “Legolas” Torin
Valentina Lyapina	Zhenya Gachina
Yura Borisov	Alexander Volkov Jr. (“Alik the Afghan”)
Ksenia Katalymova	Nadezhda Ryabinina
Stepan Devonin	Fyodor Ryabinin
Artur Beschastny	Vitaly Tsaryov

== Production ==
The concept for the series emerged in the early 2010s, but active development began in 2018. Filming of the first season took place in Tula from July to October 2019.

== Reception ==
According to Mediascope, the premiere episode achieved a 13.1% audience share among viewers aged 14–44.

Critics offered mixed to positive reviews, frequently praising the nostalgic portrayal of the 1990s and the ensemble cast.
