= Mediator (TV series) =

- Genre: Drama, thriller
- Written by: Anna Kozlova; Rina Narshi; Bella Pribylova; Ivan Ugarov; Arkady Vysootsky; Masha Milashina
- Starring: Andrey Burkovsky; Viktoria Tolstoganova; Darya Moroz; Irina Starshenbaum; Yulia Peresild
- Composers: Vadim Mayevsky; Alexander Turkunov

Production
- Producers: Eduard Iloyan; Denis Zhalinsky; Vitaly Shlyappo; Aleksey Trotsyuk; Igor Tolstunov; Irina Sosnovaya; Evgeniy Ayvazyan; Sergey Kozlov; Mikhail Tkachenko; Anna Kagarlickaya; Nikolay Suvorov
- Cinematography: Dmitry Savinov; Oleg Kolsky
- Editors: Nikolay Pigaryov; Olga Grinshpun; Andrey Anaykin
- Running time: 48 minutes

Mediator (Russian: Медиатор) is a Russian dramatic thriller television series produced by the Profit film company for the online streaming platform Start. The main roles are played by Andrey Burkovsky, Viktoria Tolstoganova, Darya Moroz, Irina Starshenbaum, and Yulia Peresild.

The premiere took place on 16 April 2021 (10 episodes). The second season premiered on 23 July 2021 (6 episodes), and the third season on 4 January 2024 (8 episodes).

== Plot ==
Andrei Pavlov (Andrey Burkovsky) is a police negotiator and mediator who specializes in talking down terrorists, hostage-takers, and suicidal individuals. Before tactical units intervene, Pavlov attempts to persuade subjects to abandon their intentions — a task he performs with consistent success.

To supplement his modest police income, Pavlov also takes clandestine private contracts from corporate clients. For a fee, he can engineer illusions, manipulate targets, and steer decisions. His cases range from convincing a young woman (Irina Starshenbaum) to sever ties with an older pursuer by fabricating a provocative public persona, to persuading a businessman’s son—recently returned from the United States—to sell his stake in the family company at the request of his sister (Darya Moroz). These operations rely on psychological fluency, improvisation, and often ruthless manipulation.

Pavlov’s routine work is disrupted when he rescues a teenage girl from a suicide attempt and is then approached by a special services officer (Yulia Peresild). Authorities believe the girl was coerced into self-harm, and only an experienced mediator can persuade her to reveal the truth. The investigation soon uncovers a web involving social media influence, vulnerable adolescents, wealthy clients, and a manipulative figure orchestrating a deadly psychological game.

In the third season, Pavlov confronts the consequences of social ostracism and reevaluates his methods. While he struggles with his own crisis, investigator Zhenya (Sofya Lebedeva) seeks his help: several women have been brutally murdered, and the trail leads to a figure known as the Steppe Wolf, leader of a cult of “runners.”

== Production ==
Filming took place in Moscow and the surrounding region from July to December 2020. The first two seasons were filmed simultaneously. According to the producers, the series was originally intended to be a single 16-episode season. However, once the release schedule became clear and coincided with the May holidays, the decision was made to split the material into two separate seasons, one released before and one after the holidays. The different season lengths were necessary to preserve the narrative logic.

The third season, which was not initially planned, was filmed in September–October 2023.

The first trailer was released on 5 April 2021. The trailer for season three was released on 6 December 2023.

As part of an unusual promotional campaign, the series was screened in a cinema: viewers could buy a ticket for a marathon session and watch all 16 episodes of seasons 1 and 2 in a single day.

The series premiered on 16 April 2021 on the Start platform. The television premiere took place on 26 June 2023 on the NTV channel. Season 2 was released on 23 July 2021. Season 3 premiered simultaneously on Start and Kinopoisk on 4 January 2024.

== Cast and characters ==
=== Main ===
Actor	Role	Character description
Andrey Burkovsky	Andrey Pavlov	Expert-negotiator with a natural talent for establishing rapport.
Viktoria Tolstoganova	Anna Alexandrovna Larina	Keeps skeletons in the closet, wants Pavlov to join her team at the Ministry of Internal Affairs.
Darya Moroz	Vera Gromova	Woman with a victim complex, raised by a despotic father; a manipulator.
Irina Starshenbaum	Marina	Anna’s extravagant daughter who readily plays psychological games.
Yulia Peresild	Maria Rusakova	Security-service officer hiding sociopathic tendencies.

== Reception ==
7 Days criticized Mediator as “a very superficial series about a supposedly charismatic antihero,” arguing that the protagonist’s manipulation techniques appear “laughable” and that the show’s psychological-thriller concept “collapses with a crash,” calling it “an empty spectacle, just like its protagonist.”

In contrast, Komsomolskaya Pravda praised the series for its strong sense of place and realism, noting that its recognizable urban environments distinguish it from the stylized aesthetic of Trigger.

A critic for Film.ru described Mediator as “a smart series about manipulating people, where psychological knowledge becomes a sinister weapon.”

Mir idei highlighted the show’s genre eclecticism, noting its documentary-influenced atmosphere and stylistic elements reminiscent of David Lynch and Christopher Nolan, calling it “a captivating psychological drama” with a morally ambiguous protagonist.

Vokrug TV emphasized the series’ practical value, arguing that its depiction of social-media-based manipulation encourages viewers to be more mindful of the information they share online.

The streaming service Ivi summarized that while the series “may not become a classic,” it nonetheless reflects progress toward “a respectable global level” in Russian television production..
