= Maria Smolnikova =

Russian actress (born 1987)

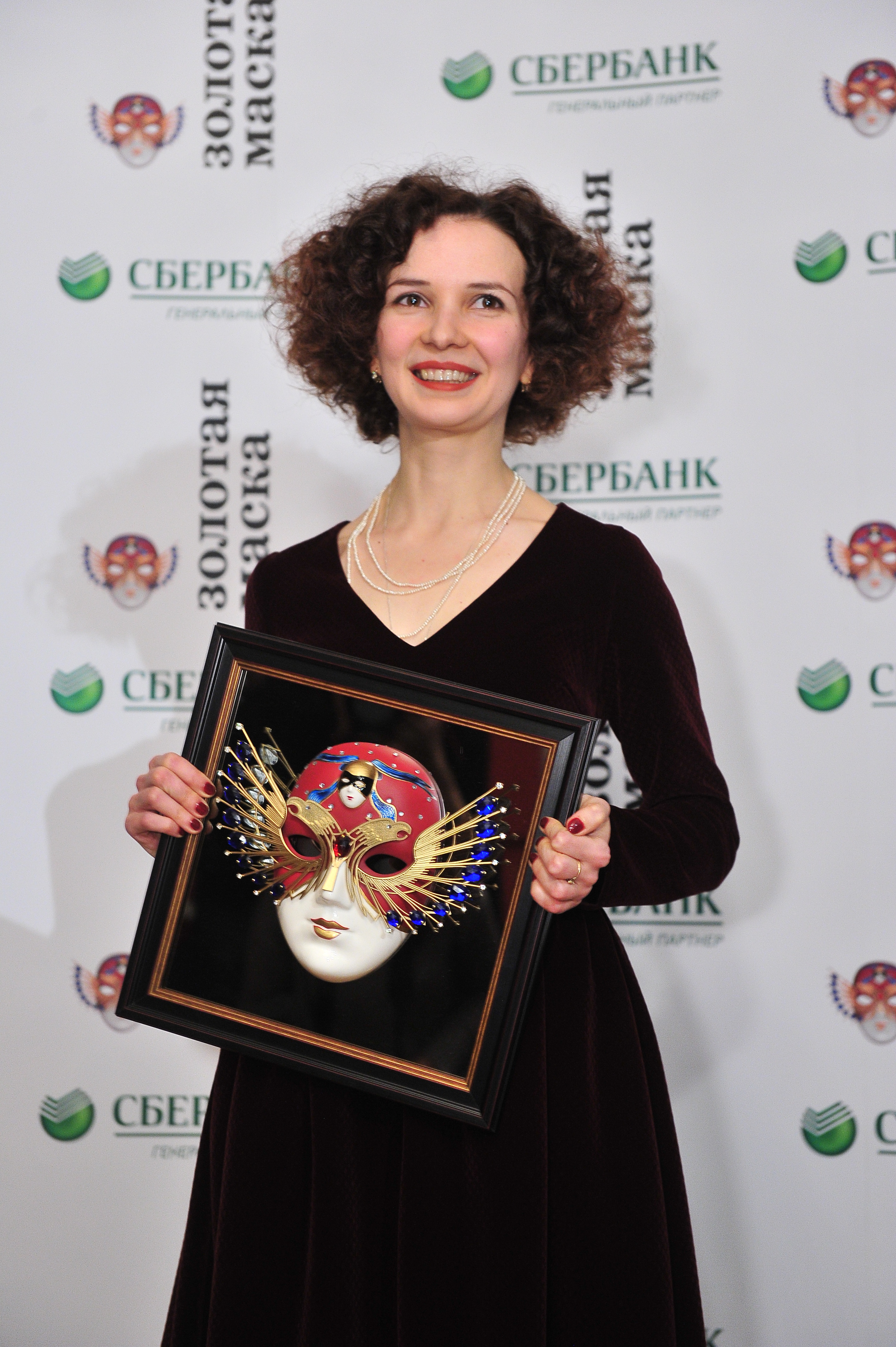
- Maria Smolnikova at the Golden Mask Award.
- Born: Maria Alexandrovna Smolnikova; 17 December 1987 (age 38); Sverdlovsk, Russian SFSR, Soviet Union
- Occupation: Actress
- Years active: 2011–present

Maria Alexandrovna Smolnikova (Russian: Мари́я Алекса́ндровна Смо́льникова; born 17 December 1987) is a Russian actress, best known for her role in the film Stalingrad (2013).

== Biography ==
Maria Smolnikova was born in Sverdlovsk, Sverdlovsk Oblast, Russian SFSR, Soviet Union (now Yekaterinburg, Russia). She studied at the experimental school in Yekaterinburg.

As a child, she acted in the Youth Theatre in Nizhny Novgorod, hoping to enter the Russian Academy of Theatre Arts (GITIS). However, the first two attempts were unsuccessful, only the third time Smolnikova was credited to the pilot course under the direction of Yevgeny Kamenkovich and Dmitry Krymov. She graduated from GITIS in 2011.

She works in the theater "School of Dramatic Art" led by Dmitry Krymov. Smolnikova became famous thanks to a lead role in the film by Fyodor Bondarchuk "Stalingrad" (2013).

== Filmography ==
Year	Title	Role	Notes
2012	Without Witness	Masha	TV series
2012	Daughter	Inna Kraynova, schoolgirl	
2013	Stalingrad	Katya	
2014	Fort Ross: In search of adventure	librarian	
2014	Kuprin	Liza	TV series
2016	After You're Gone	Alisa	
