= Sheena 667 =

- Directed by: Grigoriy Dobrygin
- Written by: Grigoriy Dobrygin; Ilya Nosochenko; Aleksandr Rodionov
- Produced by: Grigoriy Dobrygin
- Starring: Vladimir Svirskiy; Yuliya Peresild; Jordan Frye; Nadezhda Markina; Yury Kuznetsov; Pavel Vorozhtsov; Nataliya Nozdrina
- Cinematography: Mikhail Krichman
- Edited by: Danielius Kokanauskis; Vadim Krasnitsky
- Production company: Mind the Gap Films
- Distributed by: A-One Films
- Release dates: January 2019 (Rotterdam); April 15, 2021 (Russia)
- Running time: 97 minutes
- Country: Russia
- Language: Russian

Sheena 667 (Russian: Sheena 667) is a 2019 Russian drama film directed by Grigoriy Dobrygin. The film premiered at the 2019 International Film Festival Rotterdam. It is scheduled to be theatrically released on April 15, 2021 by A-One Films.

== Plot ==
The film tells about two people named Olya and Vadim who work in a car service on the outskirts of the city of Vyshny Volochyok and they love each other. And suddenly they get access to the Internet...

== Cast ==
- Vladimir Svirskiy as Vadim, the owner of a car service station
- Yuliya Peresild as Olya, Vadim's wife
- Jordan Frye as Sheena667
- Nadezhda Markina
- Yury Kuznetsov
- Pavel Vorozhtsov
- Nataliya Nozdrina
