= Russian South =

Russian comedy film

- Theatrical release poster
- Directed by: Anton Fedotov
- Written by: Zhora Kryzhovnikov; Dmitriy Litvinenko; Nikita Vlasov; Yegor Chichkanov; Kseniya Borisova; Yevgeniya Khripkova
- Produced by: Mikhail Vrubel; Aleksandr Andryushchenko; Fyodor Bondarchuk; Vyacheslav Murugov (ru); Maksim Rybakov
- Starring: Stasya Miloslavskaya; Semyon Treskunov; Rinal Mukhametov; Aleksandr Metyolkin
- Cinematography: Sergey Dyshuk
- Production companies: Columbia Pictures; Vodorod Film Company; Art Pictures Studio; STS Media; National Media Group Studio; Cinema Foundation
- Distributed by: Sony Pictures Releasing CIS
- Release date: March 4, 2021 (Russia)
- Running time: 120 minutes
- Country: Russia
- Languages: Russian; English
- Box office: ₽60.1 million; >$1 million

Russian South (Russian: Рашн Юг, romanized: Rashn Yug) is a 2021 Russian romantic comedy-drama film directed by Anton Fedotov. The plot is about the Black Sea, whose attention is sought by three men admiring one woman with someone, and love is jealous of three guys are fighting, the film stars Stasya Miloslavskaya, Semyon Treskunov, Rinal Mukhametov, and Aleksandr Metyolkin.

It is scheduled to be theatrically released on March 4, 2021, by the Russian division of Sony Pictures Releasing.

== Plot ==
Student Artem Dudin falls in love with a young beauty from the Black Sea. Head over heels, he abandons everything and travels south to Russia to pursue her, despite knowing nothing about the region. Artem takes a train from Voronezh bound for Krasnodar Krai. Once he arrives, he discovers that the beautiful Ksyusha is already being courted by two serious local rivals: a charming sailor and a bold policeman. It seems the naive student has little chance, and even the help of his new friends often only complicates things. But Artem is determined not to give up.

Ksyusha Gordeeva is already planning to marry the sentimental local policeman, Igor. However, her love life takes an unexpected turn when Nikita, a cadet at the naval school, also proposes to her. Ksyusha spends most of her time in the city diving and training at sea, with little time for social commitments.

In a dramatic moment, Ksyusha is preparing for her wedding on a yacht in the middle of the Black Sea. Suddenly, a stowaway passenger, Artem, appears, insisting on a legal marriage. Ksyusha narrowly escapes by diving into the sea and swimming safely back to shore.

Meanwhile, the naval cadet Nikita actively pursues Ksyusha, while Igor, the policeman, is also close on their trail. The marriage proposal is ultimately made on the waterfront in Kabardinka. Just as the bride is about to tie the knot, her rivals intervene. Igor defends himself with standard police weapons, while Nikita uses his Cossack background and family influence to stand his ground.

== Cast ==
- Stasya Miloslavskaya as Ksenia 'Ksyusha' Gordeeva, a diver
- Semyon Treskunov as Artem Dudin, a simple-minded student from Voronezh, is simultaneously seek the heart of Ksyusha.
- Rinal Mukhametov as Nikita, a Russian Navy cadet of the Naval School, leads a Cossack lifestyle until his beloved Ksyusha.
- Aleksandr Metyolkin as Igor, a policeman, and his beloved Ksyusha.
- Roman Madyanov as Petr Ivanovich, Igor's father
- Eldar Kalimulin as Mityai
- Daniil Vakhrushev as Eldarchik
- Magomed Murtazaaliev as Ruslan
- Darya Feklenko as Ulyana Gordeeva
- Aleksandr Robak as Leonid Gordeev
- Sergey Lavygin as Oleg
- Gleb Puskepalis as Vano
- Ekaterina Ageeva as Marina
- Ekaterina Kabak as Yana

== Production ==
=== Development ===
The director chose the picturesque Krasnodar Krai, where many films have been shot recently. The administration of the Krasnodar Territory also supports cinematography. The project was produced by Fyodor Bondarchuk. The action takes place against the backdrop of spectacular landscapes, luxurious nature and the warm sea of the Black Sea coast of the Caucasus.

Mikhail Vrubel and Aleksandr Andryushchenko, the producers of the Vodorod Film Company, wanted to continue the traditions of Russian romantic-comedy cinema. The producers knew they wanted to create a film that would contrast with the exact opposite of the film - the northern ones Ice (2018 film).

Russian South was the perfect film, which, in their opinion, described the modern tourist attraction of Russia - Krasnodar Territory. The film explores the south of Russia, its landscapes, tourism, and generally shooting in this region is a rarity. The film is also produced by Art Pictures Studio, STS Media, and National Media Group Studio.

=== Filming ===
Principal photography of the film began in August 2020, director Anton Fedotov chose the Krasnodar Krai as the locations: the town of Gelendzhik, the selo of Kabardinka in Gelendzhik District, the selo of Arkhipo-Osipovka in Gelendzhik District, and the city of Novorossiysk, as well as the territory of a unique natural object - the Chushka Spit.

The characters will be created based on the Kuban Cossacks were involved in the filming. They can be found in a mass wedding scene in the selo of Kabardinka, and the background song will be performed by Oleg Gazmanov.

== Release ==
Premiere of the film Russian South was held in Moscow at the "Karo 11 October" cinema center on February 25, and was theatrically released in the Russian Federation on March 4, 2021, by Sony Pictures Productions and Releasing (SPPR).

=== Marketing ===
The first teaser trailer of Russian South was released on December 17, 2020.

== Reception ==
=== Critical response ===
The review from Film.ru allows us to consider Russian South a tragicomedy, which begins with a comedy and ends with a tragedy. A review of the film in KinoAfish explains that “the film is not without flaws. In the end, residents of Krasnodar Krai will like the film.

Maria Tokmasheva wrote for a review of the film at Kino-Teatr.ru: "Although the film seems to be put together from several parts, it is an entertaining southern 'lyrical comedy' that displays the clichés and traditions of the South on the screen." A review of the film noted that "the script is similar to a Russian Odyssey. Only it was not written by Homer, but by Zhora Kryzhovnikov and others. Ksenia is Penelope who is being pulled down by the suitors in the middle of the sea."

Sergei Obolonkov wrote for a review of the film in Kino Mail.ru: "The secondary character actors, who are the fathers of the groom in the plot, performed well. Roman Madyanov and Aleksandr Robak, who got the roles of fathers of potential suitors, are very colorful."
