= Krasavitsa =

- Directed by: Anton Bogdanov
- Written by: Anton Bogdanov; Aleksandra Ilina; Artem Mikhailov; Dmitry Pinchukov
- Produced by: Anton Bogdanov; Iren Vanidovskaya; Evgeny Nemolyaev; Evgeniya Aronova; Anna Tsepeleva; Lala Rustamova; Timur Asadov; Ara Khachatryan; Dmitry Sergeev; Mikhail Shulyatyev; Mariya Zatulovskaya; Olga Yuntunen; Dariya Sergeeva; Vera Popova; Anastasiya Zdeb
- Starring: Yulia Peresild; Slava Kopeykin; Stasya Miloslavskaya; Viktor Sukhorukov; Ivan Dobronravov; Vladimir Afanasyev; Polina Aynutdinova; Yelisey Chuchilin
- Cinematography: Mikhail Milashin
- Edited by: Mariya Sergeyenkova; Kirill Araslanov
- Music by: Yuri Poteyenko
- Production companies: Pandora; Prospect Mira Film Company; Russia-1; Cinema Fund
- Distributed by: VLG.FILM
- Release date: February 19, 2026 (Russia)
- Running time: 103 minutes
- Country: Russia
- Language: Russian
- Budget: ₽450 million
- Box office: ₽341 million

Krasavitsa (Russian: Красавица, romanized: Krasavitsa, lit. 'Beauty') is a 2026 Russian historical adventure film written, produced, and directed by Anton Bogdanov, based on the true story of the rescue of animals from the siege of Leningrad. The film stars actress Yulia Peresild as Evdokia Ivanovna Dashina, a real-life zookeeper who helped the hippopotamus named 'Krasavitsa' ('Beauty') and other animals survive the difficult years of the siege. The film also stars Slava Kopeykin, Stasya Miloslavskaya, Viktor Sukhorukov, Ivan Dobronravov, and Vladimir Afanasyev. The film tells the story of the efforts to save a hippopotamus named Krasavitsa, voiced by Mariya Aronova.

This film was theatrically released on February 19, 2026, by VLG.FILM.

== Plot ==
The film takes place in the winter of 1941 in Leningrad. Sergeant Major Nikolai Svetlov suffers a severe concussion and, after treatment, is assigned to a zoo, where the staff save animals from death every day. A female hippopotamus named Beauty is special. At first, Nikolai wants to return to the front as soon as possible, but over time, he begins to understand the importance of his mission.

== Cast ==
- Yulia Peresild as Evdokia Dashina (also spelled Yevdokia Dashina), an employee of the Leningrad Zoo who rescued a hippopotamus named Krasavitsa during the 1941 siege.
- Slava Kopeykin as Sergeant Major Nikolai Svetlov, a Navy petty officer and defender of Leningrad during the 1941 siege.
- Stasya Miloslavskaya as Anna, a young zoo employee and zootechnician
- Viktor Sukhorukov as Martyn Ivanovich, a veterinarian.
- Ivan Dobronravov
- Vladimir Afanasyev
- Polina Aynutdinova as Zoya "Zoyka", a little girl
- Yelisey Chuchilin as a little boy

Voice cast

- Mariya Aronova as Krasavitsa, voice acting

== Production ==
Anton Bogdanov served as director, screenwriter, and producer. The film is based on the true story of the selfless rescue of animals from the Leningrad Zoo in the winter of 1941, including the hippopotamus Krasavitsa.

=== Filming ===
Principal photography launched in late January 2025 in Saint Petersburg.
