= Lyubov Aksyonova =

Russian actress

- Любовь Аксёнова
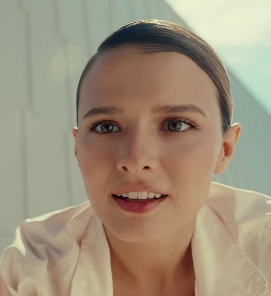
- Aksyonova in 2024
- Born: March 15, 1990 (age 36); Moscow, Russian SFSR, Soviet Union (now Russia)
- Occupation: Actress
- Years active: 2009–present
- Spouse: Pavel Aksyonov

Lyubov Pavlovna Aksyonova, née Novikova (Russian: Любовь Павловна Аксёнова; born March 15, 1990) is a Russian actress.

== Early life and education ==
Lyubov Pavlovna Aksyonova was born Lyubov Pavlovna Novikova on March 15, 1990 in Moscow. She studied at the Russian Institute of Theatre Arts. In 2012 she made her film debut.

== Acting career ==
She made her debut as an actress in 2009, starring in several episodes of the series Detectives and Trace.

In 2011, she starred in the television series Univer. New Dorm. In the same year, after filming the television series Closed School, where she played one of the key roles, the actress became recognizable and in demand. In 2012 she played one of the main roles in the feature film Short Stories, which opened her way to big cinema.

In 2017, the actress played in the film Salyut 7. In 2018–2019. Among her works are roles in the films Beyond the Edge (2018 film), The Perfect Ones (2018 film), and Coma (2020 film).

== Selected filmography ==
List of film credits
Year	Title	Role	Notes
2012	Short Stories	Girl	
2014	Love Does Not Love	Alyona	
2016	Guardians of the Night	Dana Lokis	
2017	Have Fun, Vasya!	Vasilisa 'Vasya'	
2017	Salyut 7	Liliya Alyokhina	
2018	Beyond the Edge	Veronika	
2018	The Perfect Ones		
2020	Coma	"Fly"	
2020	Deeper!	Lera	(ru)
2021	Have Fun, Vasya! Date in Bali	Vasilisa 'Vasya'	
2021	Major Grom: Plague Doctor	Yulia Pchyolkina	
2021	Girls Got Game	Dasha "Danya" Belykh	
2023	Nuremberg	Lena	
2026	Mayor Grom. Igra protiv pravil	Yulia Pchyolkina	
2026	Hater	Tanya	

List of television credits
Year	Title	Role	Notes
2009	Detectives	Nastya Usoltseva	(ru)
2009	Trace	Anna Kunitsyna	
2011	Univer. New Dorm	Olga	
2011	Closed School	Kristina Panfilova	(ru)
2013	The Day After	Marina	(ru)
2014	Hugging the Sky	Zhenya Lugovaya	
2016	Silven Spoon	Ekaterina Ignatieva	
2017	The Road to Calvary	Ganna	
2018	The Mutiny	Liza Zhuravlyova	(ru)
2020	Gold Diggers	Natalya	(ru)
2020	Nastya, Cheer Up!	Nastya	
2020	Triada	Natasha	
2021	Former	Yana	(ru)
2022	Kidney	Natasha	(ru)
2022	The Telki	Vika	
2024	Crime and Punishment	Dunya Raskolnikova	
2026	Puteshestvie na solntse i obratno	Mama Lena	
2026	Kholod	Zhenya	
