= Invasion (2020 film) =

- Theatrical release poster
- Directed by: Fyodor Bondarchuk
- Screenplay by: Oleg Malovichko; Andrey Zolotarev
- Produced by: Fyodor Bondarchuk; Dmitriy Rudovskiy; Mikhail Vrubel; Aleksandr Andryushchenko; Anton Zlatopolskiy (ru); Elena Nelidova; Mikhail Kitaev
- Starring: Irina Starshenbaum; Rinal Mukhametov; Alexander Petrov; Yuri Borisov; Oleg Menshikov; Sergei Garmash; Pavel Kizhuk
- Cinematography: Vladislav Opelyants
- Edited by: Aleksandr Andryushchenko; Aleksandr Puzyryov
- Music by: Igor Vdovin
- Production companies: Columbia Pictures; Art Pictures Studio; Vodorod; Cinema Foundation; Russia-1; National Media Group Studio
- Distributed by: WDSSPR
- Release date: January 1, 2020
- Running time: 129 minutes
- Country: Russia
- Languages: Russian, English
- Budget: $14.8 million (₽944 million)
- Box office: $15.8 million (₽960 million)

Invasion, also known as Attraction 2 (Russian: Вторжение, romanized: Vtorzhenie), is a 2020 Russian science fiction action film directed and produced by Fyodor Bondarchuk's company - Art Pictures Studio and Vodorod pictures. The film is a sequel to Attraction (2017), and its plot directly continues the events from the previous film. The film stars Irina Starshenbaum, Rinal Mukhametov, Alexander Petrov, Yuri Borisov, Oleg Menshikov, and Sergei Garmash.

Invasion is Bondarchuk's fifth feature-length film and the eighth Russian film shot in IMAX format. It premiered in preview at the end of December 26, 2019. A wide distribution of the film took place in Russia on January 1, 2020, by WDSSPR. It was the final film distributed by WDSSPR before its dissolution between Walt Disney Studios and Sony Pictures Releasing.

== Cast ==
- Irina Starshenbaum as Yulia 'Yulya' Lebedeva (English: Julia)
- Rinal Mukhametov as Hekon / Khariton (English: Hakon)
- Alexander Petrov as Artyom Tkachyov, Yulya's former boyfriend
- Yuri Borisov as Captain Ivan 'Vanya' Korobanov
- Oleg Menshikov as General-major Valentin Lebedev
- Sergei Garmash as vice-premier
- Yevgeny Mikheev as Gleb Karakhanov "Google", a classmate and friend of Yulya, an employee of the company "Rostelecom"
- Daniil Kolzenov as a technician
- Sergey Troyev as TV channel technician
- Igor Kosterin as VSK Adjutant (major)
- Andrey Nazimov as IT Department Manager
- Pavel Kizhuk as IT Manager Oleg

== Production ==
=== Development ===
In March 2017, the project director Fyodor Bondarchuk officially confirmed the continuation of the Attraction series, announcing the proposed sequel. The budget for the second installation of the series (as yet unnamed) was planned for 645 million rubles. The pre-production continued for a year and a half.

=== Filming ===
Principal photography began on July 24, 2018. The film was shot in Moscow, as well as Kaliningrad, Kamchatka Peninsula and Hungary.

== Music ==
The soundtrack was written by composer Igor Vdovin.

The film's IMAX trailer features the song "Universe Has No End" from Imagine Music's 2018 album Supreme II.

== Release ==
Invasion was released in the Russian Federation on January 1, 2020, by Walt Disney Studios Sony Pictures Releasing (WDSSPR).

=== Marketing ===
Comic-Con Russia 2019 was held in Moscow for the sixth time from October 3 to 6 at the Crocus Expo Pavilion No.1. Simultaneously with the festival, the fourteenth annual exhibition of interactive entertainment "IgroMir" was held.

Trailer 48 aired on May 23, 2019, and the IMAX trailer was released on December 12, 2019. The trailers were presented in the original Russian version with English subtitles.

=== Home media ===
Invasion is the third film directed by Fyodor Bondarchuk, released in IMAX format after Stalingrad and Attraction.

The film was released in Russia on DVD, Blu-ray and iTunes on March 3, 2020.
