= Milk (2021 film) =

- Directed by: Karen Oganesyan
- Written by: Yekaterina Mavromatis
- Produced by: Karen Oganesyan; Polina Ivanova; Irina Voronova
- Starring: Yulia Peresild; Andrey Burkovsky; Gosha Kutsenko; Yuri Kolokolnikov; Yelena Valyushkina; Yevgeni Grishkovetz
- Cinematography: Yevgeniya Abdel-Fattakh
- Edited by: Avet Oganesyan
- Production companies: Irsna Media; Kargo Film
- Distributed by: Sony Pictures Productions and Releasing (SPPR)
- Release date: September 23, 2021
- Running time: 119 minutes
- Country: Russia
- Language: Russian

Milk (Russian: Молоко, romanized: Moloko) is a 2021 Russian comedy-drama film directed by Karen Oganesyan. It was theatrically released on September 23, 2021, by Sony Pictures Productions and Releasing (SPPR).

== Plot ==
The film takes place in the beautiful city of Kirovsk, Murmansk Oblast, where an ordinary girl Zoya lives, who, thanks to the northern lights, gains the ability to change the fate of people.

== Cast ==
- Yulia Peresild as Zoya
- Andrey Burkovsky as Seryozha
- Eric Panich as a teenager
- Egor Abramov
- Yevgeniya Kaverau as Tanya
- Gosha Kutsenko as Tanya's dad
- Yuri Kolokolnikov as an exhibitionist mammologist
- Yelena Valyushkina as a school principal
- Irina Voronova as a pharmacist
- Yevgeni Grishkovetz
