= The Bull (2019 film) =

- Directed by: Boris Akopov
- Written by: Boris Akopov
- Produced by: Fyudor Popov; Vladimir Malyshev; Mikhail Chechelnitsky
- Starring: Yuri Borisov; Stasya Miloslavskaya; Afina Kondrashova; Yegor Kenzhametov; Aleksandr Samsonov; Igor Savochkin; Aleksey Filimonov; Sergey Dvoynikov
- Cinematography: Gleb Filatov
- Edited by: Boris Akopov
- Music by: Anton Bulle
- Production company: Vgik-Debyut
- Distributed by: Novy Film
- Release date: August 22, 2019
- Running time: 99 minutes
- Country: Russia
- Language: Russian

The Bull (Russian: Бык, romanized: Byk) is a 2019 Russian crime drama film directed by Boris Akopov. The main prize-winner of the Kinotavr 2019. It was theatrically released in Russia on August 22, 2019 by Novy Film.

== Plot ==
The film is set in Russia in the 90s. Anton Bykov, the leader of a criminal group, has to earn money by any means in order to feed his family. And suddenly he ends up in a police station, from where he got out thanks to one Moscow authority, who for his help asks Anton for one terrible service...

== Cast ==
- Yuri Borisov as Anton Bykov
- Stasya Miloslavskaya as Tanya
- Afina Kondrashova as Anya Bykova
- Yegor Kenzhametov as Misha Bykov
- Aleksandr Samsonov as Makedonsky
- Igor Savochkin as Moisey
- Aleksey Filimonov as Maus
- Sergey Dvoynikov as Duglas
