= Attraction (2017 film) =

- US theatrical release poster
- Directed by: Fyodor Bondarchuk
- Screenplay by: Andrey Zolotaryov; Oleg Malovichko
- Produced by: Fyodor Bondarchuk; Dmitriy Rudovskiy; Mikhail Vrubel; Gabriel Klement; Aleksandr Andryushchenko; Anton Zlatopolskiy
- Starring: Irina Starshenbaum; Alexander Petrov; Rinal Mukhametov; Oleg Menshikov; Nikita Kukushkin; Evgeniy Sangadzhiev; Aleksey Maslodudov
- Cinematography: Mikhail Khasaya
- Edited by: Aleksandr Andryushchenko
- Music by: Ivan Burlyaev
- Production companies: Columbia Pictures; Art Pictures Studio; Vodorod 2011; Cinema Foundation; Russia-1
- Distributed by: WDSSPR
- Release date: 26 January 2017 (Russia)
- Running time: 132 minutes
- Country: Russia
- Language: Russian
- Budget: $6.3 million (380 million RUB)
- Box office: $19.4 million (1,073,381,680 RUB)

Attraction (Russian: Притяжение, romanized: Prityazhenie) is a 2017 Russian science fiction action film directed by Fyodor Bondarchuk. The plot focuses upon an extraterrestrial spaceship crash-landing in the Chertanovo district of Moscow after an attack by Russian Air Forces. The Russian government immediately implements martial law, as local civilians grow increasingly angry at the unwelcome guest due to false propaganda. The film stars Irina Starshenbaum, Alexander Petrov, Rinal Mukhametov, and Oleg Menshikov.

The project became the fourth Russian film transferred to the IMAX 3D format. The premiere of the film in Russia was in January 2017 by Walt Disney Studios Sony Pictures Releasing (WDSSPR). Attraction became a box office hit, grossing more than 1 billion rubles and becoming the highest-grossing Russian sci-fi movie. The film received mixed reviews from western critics.

A sequel to the film, Invasion, premiered on New Year's Day 2020.

== Summary ==
After a spaceship crash-lands in the center of Moscow, a young woman finds herself torn between loyalty to her seemingly normal life and the allure of a new state of being promised by one of the aliens.

== Plot ==
The storyline revolves around colonel Valentin Lebedev (Oleg Menshikov), who is in charge of the military operation, his daughter Yulia (Irina Starshenbaum), who develops a romantic relationship with the alien Hekon (Rinal Mukhametov), and her former boyfriend Artyom (Alexander Petrov) who is the main antagonist.

Hekon is a representative of a technologically advanced humanoid race who reaches Earth incognito for research purposes. His spaceship, named "Sol," was damaged by a meteor shower. The Russian Air Force mistook his spaceship for a NATO spy satellite/spacecraft and damaged it by firing missiles into it, causing it to crash into several buildings in Moscow and kill hundreds of people. It was on that same day when Yulia and Artyom had finished attending a meteor-watching event, when Yulia's friend Svetlana (Darya Rudenok) was killed while watching some meteors.

The Russian government decided not to contact the ship's occupants and let it fix itself on its own. The landing area was evacuated, fenced, and guarded, and Moscow was placed under a curfew. Meanwhile, Yulia, Artyom, and his friends Khariton, Ruslan (Nikita Kukushkin), and Piton (Evgeniy Sangadzhiev) sneak into the crash site to investigate the alien: after they beat him up and cause him to crash down a building, they retrieve his armor before an army patrol may find them. On another day, Yulia sneaks again to retrieve the alien, placing him to a nerdy classmate known as "Google" (Evgeniy Mikheev) to help the alien recover. While examining his body, she notices a wristband forming on her right wrist, which manipulates water.

The alien, who introduces himself as "Hekon", was initially unsure about Earth and its people, but tells them that he is looking for a device known as "Shilk", that allows him to travel through space without destroying his body. Shilk, like the spaceship, appears to be attracting water. As he goes out to the streets to look for the device, the police mistake him for a drug addict and send him off to a police station to be interrogated.

Meanwhile, Artyom and his friends drive in their car to inform Colonel Lebedev about the alien's armor that they had hidden in their garage. and stumble upon a crowd who is angry over rationed water, as the spaceship appears to absorb water in order to repair itself. Ruslan decides to provoke the crowd into becoming a disorderly riot. Artyom is hit by a policeman's baton as he tries to convince people to start rioting, and is taken to the police station but he forgets to tell Colonel Lebedev about his discovery.

In order to get Shilk, Yulia goes to see her father, who interrupts his meeting with his officers when she informed him that she is pregnant with Hekon's child. She actually says this to distract him, so Hekon can disguise himself as a scientist and take Shilk from its container, and also because she was upset that he did not spend much time with her after her mother died.

Yulia confesses her true feelings for Hekon in a phone call to Artyom, while Artyom arrives with his friends to beat up the alien. Hekon fights back, and when one of Artyom's friends tries to shoot Hekon, Ruslan is shot by accident instead. Artyom and one of his friends flee before the police would arrest them. He reports this incident to gather many supporters and form a group to attack Hekon's spaceship, and avenge Ruslan's death, whom he blames the alien for causing it. In spite of his initial support, Piton sometimes expresses doubt on Artyom's goals.

Artyom's group breaks through a police barricade, triggering several other robotic suits to come out and fight against the mob. Yulia and Hekon drive through the police barricade and the mob using a military car to return him and Shilk back to their ship, while fending off against Artyom, who angrily rampages using Hekon's suit. Hekon defeats Artyom, but Artyom shoots him and Yulia with a dropped military rifle. Saddened by this, Colonel Lebedev follows several walking suits as they carry Yulia and Hekon to the spaceship, where its machinery uses water to nurse Yulia's injuries. The spaceship's computer also responds to Lebedev's questions about Hekon's mission to observe the Earth, as its warlike civilizations and history had made it very unsafe for interstellar contact. However, Yulia's love for Hekon, and her willingness to protect him, have caused the computer's authorities to rewrite the results of their study on Earth.

Yulia, her father, and everyone else return to their daily lives, as the spaceship departs and releases excess water. Meanwhile, Artyom is arrested and presumably sent to a prison camp.

The song of the movie is vocalized by Yulia at the end: The truth is that one alien from far away trusted us more than we trust ourselves.

== Cast ==
- Irina Starshenbaum as Yulia 'Yulya' Lebedeva (English: Julia)
- Alexander Petrov as Artyom 'Tyoma' Tkachyov (English: Tom)
- Rinal Mukhametov as Hekon / Khariton (English: Hakon)
- Oleg Menshikov as Colonel Valentin Lebedev, Yulya's father
- Nikita Kukushkin as Ruslan "Rus"
- Yevgeny Sangadzhiev as Python
- Aleksey Maslodudov as Yevgeny 'Zhenya'
- Yevgeny Mikheev as Gleb Karakhanov "Google", a classmate and friend of Yulya
- Anton Shpinkov as student Mironov, a classmate of Yulya
- Yevgeny Koryakovsky as teacher
- Darya Rudenok as Svetlana 'Sveta' Morozova, a classmate of Yulya
- Lyudmila Maksakova as Lyubov 'Lyuba', Yulya's grandmother
- Mikhail Mironov as correspondent of TV channel "Life News"
- Denis Karasev as general
- Aleksandr Nikolskiy as boat captain
- Sergey Shatalov as Mishkin, senior lieutenant
- Oleg Novikov as lieutenant protection
- Leonid Lefterov as security guard
- Nikita Tarasov as State Duma deputy Mikhail Poleskin
- Maksim Evseev as officer of RKO
- Sergei Garmash as Deputy Prime Minister
- Yuriy Sazonov as doctor

== Production ==
=== Filming ===
Principal photography began in November 2015. The shooting took place in strict secrecy in different regions of Moscow, mainly in Chertanovo, and at the facilities of the Ministry of Defense with the participation of the latest military equipment of the Russian Armed Forces. The shooting involved armored personnel carriers, helicopters, Uranus-6 robots, drones, armored vehicles GAZ Tigr, Typhoon (AFV family) and the Russian aircraft carrier Admiral Kuznetsov.

=== Post-production ===
The visual effects involved 255 artists of the Russian company Main Road Post, which until that time worked on the films Metro (2013 film), August Eighth (2012 film), Wanted (2008 film), Stalingrad (2013 film) and The Duelist (2016 film). It took about a year and a half to work with effects. The most difficult effects are considered the moment of the fall of the spacecraft.

== Soundtrack ==
The music for the picture was written by composer Ivan Burlyaev.

The soundtrack includes 34 tracks. On January 26, the soundtrack for the film was released on Yandex Music, and on January 27 in iTunes.

== Release ==
Attraction was released in Russia, Armenia, Belarus and Kazakhstan on 26 January 2017 and Vietnam on 27 January 2017.

== Reception ==
The budget of the film was 380 million rubles, or, according to other sources, 520 million rubles including film marketing.

=== Box office ===
Attraction was a commercial success. It grossed 44 million RUB on its opening day, and held on the top of Russian box office for several weeks. By the end of its theatrical run, Attraction grossed more than 1 billion RUB, approximately three times the movie's budget.

=== Critical response ===
Attraction received significant positive reviews in Russian media, including Afisha, Kommersant, Mir Fantastiki, KG-portal, and The Hollywood Reporter. According to review aggregator Kritikanstvo.ru, out of 58 reviews, 10 were negative, and the average rating of the movie was 6.4 out of 10. Attraction was praised for its social commentary, visuals and acting (Oleg Menshikov's performance in particular), but some reviews criticized the movie's negative portrayal of Russian youth and certain inconsistencies in characterization.

Attraction has an approval rating of 36% on review aggregator website Rotten Tomatoes, based on 11 reviews, and an average rating of 4.90/10.
