= Rinal Mukhametov =

Russian actor

- Born: Rinal Albertovitch Mukhametov; Alexeyevskoye, Tatar ASSR, RSFSR, USSR (now Tatarstan, Russia)
- Citizenship: Russian
- Occupation: Actor
- Years active: 2011–present

Rinal Albertovitch Mukhametov (Russian: Риналь Альбертович Мухаметов, Tatar: Ринәл Альберт улы Мөхәммәтов) is a Russian actor, of Volga Tatar origin.

== Early life and education ==
Rinal Albertovitch Mukhametov was born in Alexeyevskoye, Tatar Autonomous Soviet Socialist Republic, Russian SFSR, Soviet Union (now Republic of Tatarstan, Russia).

He graduated from the variety and circus department of the Kazan Theater School.

== Selected filmography ==
Year	Title	Role	Notes
2017	Attraction	alien Hekon / Khariton	
2017	Baltic Tango	Max	
2019	Abigail	Norman	
2020	Invasion	alien Hekon / Khariton	
2020	Coma	Viktor	
2021	Russian South	Nikita	
