= Alexey Barabash =

Russian actor

- Алексей Барабаш
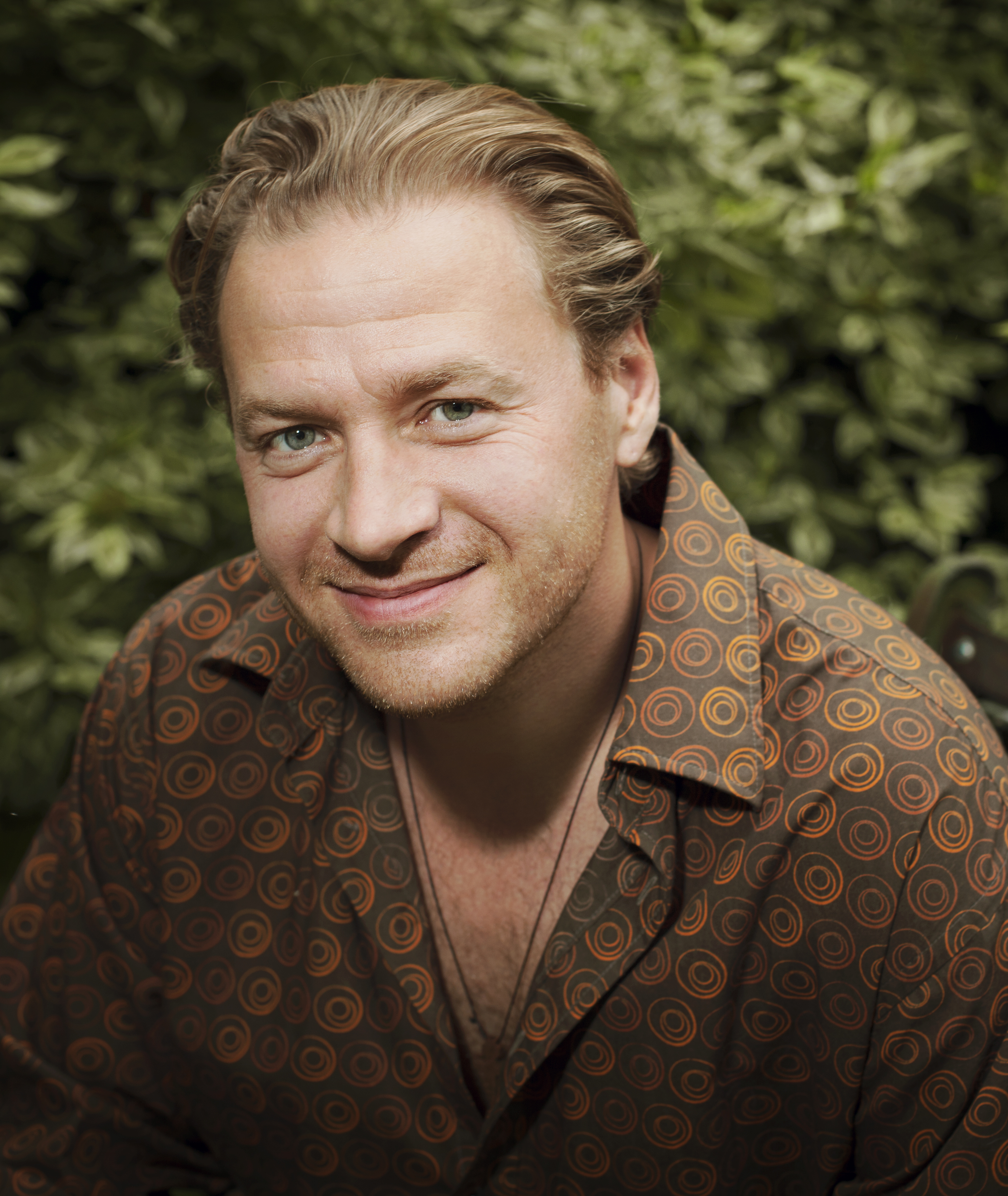
- Alexey Barabash, actor
- Born: Alexey Igorevich Barabash; 12 June 1977 (age 48); Leningrad, RSFSR, USSR
- Occupation: Actor
- Years active: 2000–present
- Website: Alexey Barabash

Alexey Igorevich Barabash (Russian: Алексе́й И́горевич Бараба́ш; born 12 June 1977) is a Russian actor. He is known for playing the role of Nikiforov in Stalingrad (2013).

== Biography ==
Alexey Barabash was born in Leningrad, Russian SFSR, Soviet Union (now Saint Petersburg, Russia). In 1997 he graduated from Saint Petersburg University of Humanities, Zinovy Yakovlevich Korogodskii workshop, and was admitted to the troupe of the Saint Petersburg Youth Theater under the direction of Anatoly Praudin.

In 1998, a part of the troupe moved to the Baltic House Festival Theatre, where Anatoly Praudin created an experimental stage.

== Career ==
In 2000, Alexey left the Repertory theater and began a career in cinema, Destructive power 2 (TV Series 2001), Alexey Barabash has appeared in over 75 films.

== Filmography ==
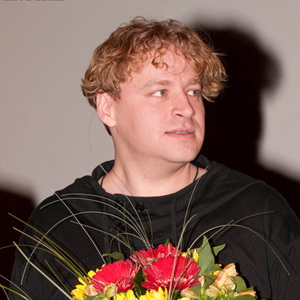
Barabash at the premiere of the film in cinema, 2010.

Year	Title	Role	Notes
2001	Sisters		Episode (cut)
2002	Russian Ark	Second Cavalier	
2003	Streets of Broken Lights	Kirill Zheludkov	TV series
2006	Piter FM	Kostya	
2012	Brief Guide To A Happy Life	Dina	TV series
2013	Stalingrad	spy Alexander Nikiforov	
2015	The Dawns Here Are Quiet	Guest Brichkin	Episode
2015	These eyes opposite	Valery Obodzinsky	TV series
2016	Please take my word	Andrei	Mini-Series
2016	Pure art	Aleksandr Kovalev, art dealer	
2016	The Icebreaker	Anatoliy Eremeev, senior assistant captain	
2016	Diary of a new Russian	Roman	
2020	On the Edge	Konstantin	
2021	The Pilot. A Battle for Survival		
2022	Little Red Riding Hood	Alex	
