= Short Stories (film) =

2012 Russian film by Mikhail Segal

- Film poster
- Russian: Рассказы
- Directed by: Mikhail Segal
- Starring: Andrey Merzlikin
- Release date: 15 November 2012
- Running time: 105 minutes
- Country: Russia
- Language: Russian

Short Stories (Russian: Рассказы, romanized: Rasskazy) is a 2012 Russian mystery comedy-drama film directed by Mikhail Segal.
