= On the Edge (2020 film) =

- Directed by: Eduard Bordukov
- Written by: Eduard Bordukov; Aleksandr Yegorov; Mikhail Kakuberi; Anton Sheyenson; Anna Sobolevskaya; Igor Gordashnik
- Produced by: Elena Glikman; Mikhail Dekhtyar; Irina Medvedeva; Anna Gudkova
- Starring: Svetlana Khodchenkova; Stasya Miloslavskaya; Sergei Puskepalis; Alexey Barabash; Kirill Degtyar
- Cinematography: Mikhail Milashkin
- Edited by: Aleksandr Koshelev; Yekaterina Pivneva
- Music by: Oleg Belov; Dmitriy Yemelyanov
- Production company: Telesto Film Company
- Distributed by: Central Partnership
- Release date: November 26, 2020
- Running time: 115 minutes
- Country: Russia
- Language: Russian
- Box office: ₽78 million; $1.081.472; $1.088.204 (Russia)

On the Edge (Russian: На острие, romanized: Na ostriye) is a 2020 Russian sports drama film directed by Eduard Bordukov. Women's fencing in a confrontation between two swordswomen on sabers, the film stars Svetlana Khodchenkova, Stasya Miloslavskaya, Sergei Puskepalis, and Alexey Barabash. The film was theatrically released on November 26, 2020, by Central Partnership.

== Plot ==
Aleksandra Pokrovskaya is a famous saber fencer, who has the last goal – to take Olympic gold. Aleksandra's path is blocked by another talented athlete – a young and unknown saber fencer Kira Egorova. Kira is ambitious, self-confident. She certainly wants to get to the Olympics. Winning competitions one by one, she firmly goes to the goal. But her rival is the experienced Aleksandra, who devoted her whole life to fencing. Aleksandra intends to go to the Olympics and take gold. The gold medal of the Olympiad is the goal of her whole life. And the sudden appearance of an opponent who can stop her makes her even stronger (and this is exactly the plan of her trainer). But in order to achieve success, you have to go for meanness, which Aleksandra cannot forgive herself. At one of the competitions in a duel with Aleksandra, Kira injures her leg. At first Aleksandra rejoices at the victory, but then her conscience begins to torment her. After all, Kira was not herself in a duel because of a meeting with her alcoholic father, whom Aleksandra had brought (knowing that Kira did not want to see him). And Kira received a leg injury after being pushed by Aleksandra. Aleksandra comes to Kira's dorm and offers her help in preparing for the Olympics. She at first refuses, but later agrees and they begin to train secretly from their coach despite Kira's injured knee. And Kira goes to the Olympics. Having defeated rivals from other countries, Kira and Aleksandra reach the final. Kira succumbs at first, but Aleksandra demands a real attack from her. Kira wins with a score of 15:14 and receives a gold medal. The next day, in the team competition, Aleksandra makes a decisive injection and the Russian team wins. Before the credits, footage is shown with real Olympic fencing champions from Russia.

== Cast ==
- Svetlana Khodchenkova as Aleksandra 'Sasha' Pokrovskaya, a saber fencer

Sasha realizes that she is losing her grip. Once she herself was the same daring as Kira Egorova, and now she is getting old. She is under pressure from the coach and society, reminding every minute that victory is her only chance. Kira, as a predator, feels the weakness of Sasha Pokrovskaya and is ready to strike a decisive blow, but she herself becomes a hostage of circumstances. In an instant, she can lose everything she aspires to.

- Stasya Miloslavskaya as Kira Egorova, a saber fencer

Kira is only 19 years, but the athlete is daring, smart and experienced beyond her years. It seems that yesterday she just got into the national team, and has already managed to win several victories. The whole of Russia is watching and experiencing her, she does not leave the covers of glossy magazines and continues to conquer the public with her skill. Kira's main goal is to take the place of Sasha Pokrovskaya.

- Sergei Puskepalis as Gavrilov, coach of the Russian national team
- Alexey Barabash as Konstantin, husband of Aleksandra Pokrovskaya
- Kirill Degtyar as Mark, TV journalist, Kira Egorova's boyfriend
- Sofya Ernst as Nina Pogodina, a saber fencer
- Khilda Karmen as Alina Rybnikova, a saber fencer
- Yevgeny Syty as Kira Egorova's father

=== Cameos ===
- Pavel Kolobkov as Minister of Sports (cameo)
- Mariya Kiselyova as Olympic champion (cameo)

== Production ==
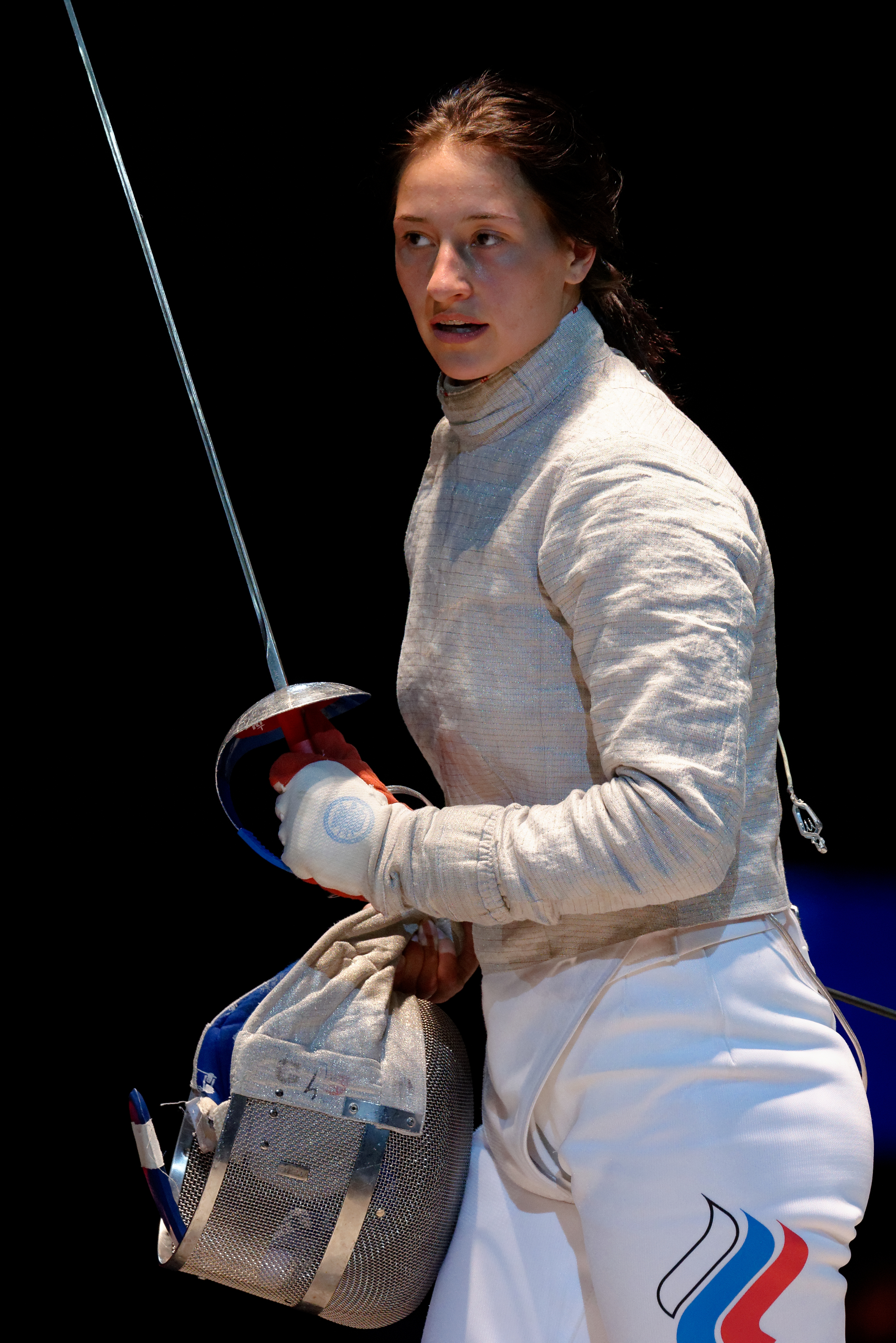
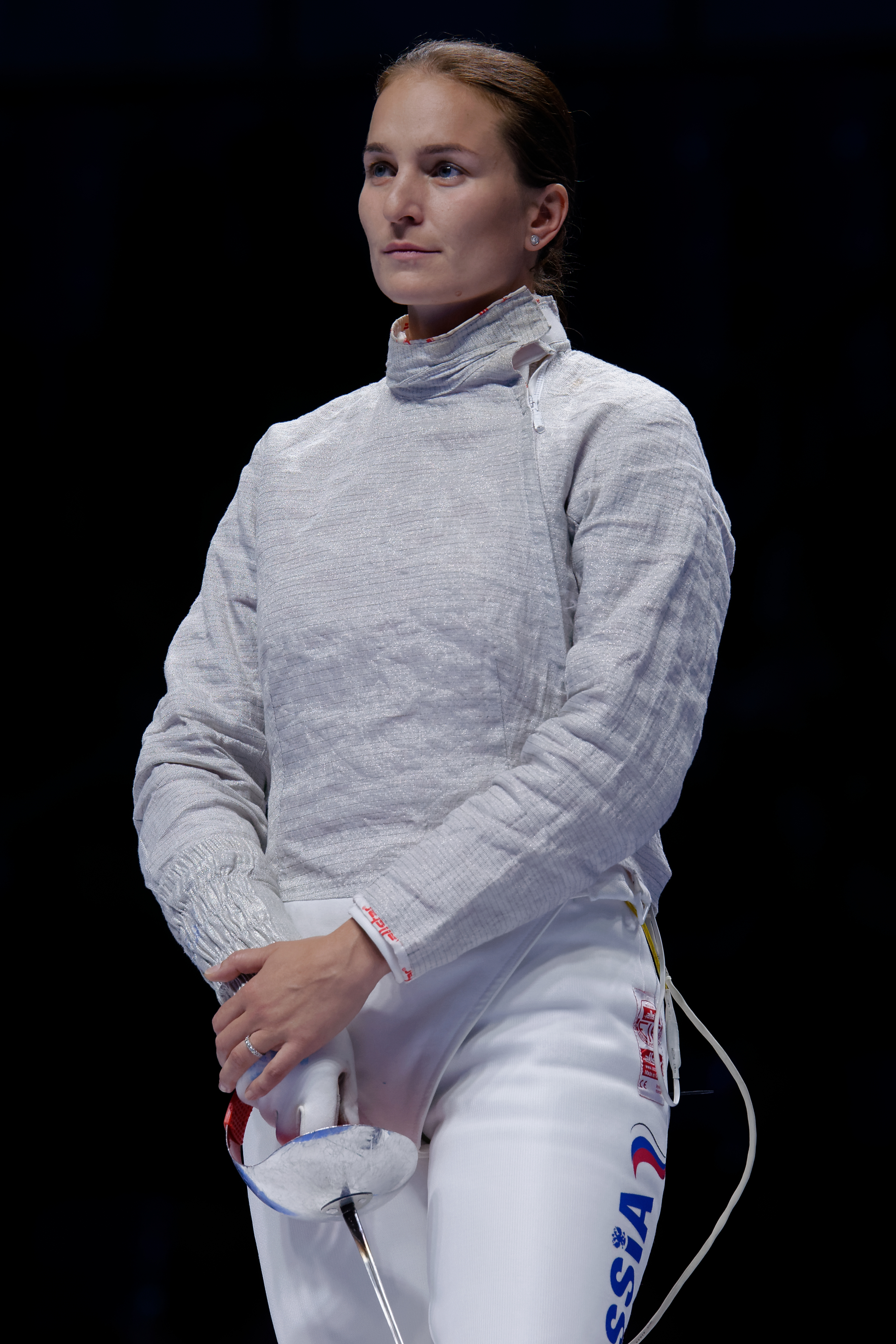
Two Russian sabre fencers compete in the final: 1st (Yana Egorian) and 2nd (Sofiya Velikaya). 1st place team competition in the finals of the 2016 Summer Olympics.

Stasya Miloslavskaya shared in an interview that the Olympic champion Yana Egorian had chosen the prototype for her character.

Famous personalities of Russia starred in the film On the Edge: the Minister of Sports of the Russian Federation and the world champion in fencing on épée Pavel Kolobkov, the Russian sportswoman and TV presenter Mariya Kiselyova.

=== Filming ===
Principal photography took place in Moscow, Russia and France. Competitions were filmed at the Dynamo Sports Palace in Moscow, international tournaments were filmed at locations in France. In the filming, Pavel Kolobkov also took part in a cameo.

== Release ==
On the Edge was shown at the cinemas in Russia by Central Partnership on November 26, 2020.
