= Stasya Miloslavskaya =

Russian actress (b. 1995)

- Стася Милославская
- Born: Anastasia Petrovna Miloslavskaya; 4 May 1995 (age 31); Moscow, Russia
- Occupation: Actress
- Years active: 2015–present

Anastasia Petrovna Miloslavskaya (Russian: Анастаси́я Петро́вна Милосла́вская; born 4 May 1995), known professionally as Stasya Miloslavskaya (Russian: Стася Милославская), is a Russian stage and film actress.

== Biography ==
=== Early life ===
Miloslavskaya was born in Moscow. Her father is a musician and composer, artistic director of the ensemble; her mother worked as a model, sang in musicals, and was a translator from Italian.

In 2013-2017 she studied at the Moscow Art Theatre School under Yevgeny Pisarev. After graduation, she was accepted into the troupe of the Moscow Pushkin Drama Theatre.

=== Career ===
She made her film debut in 2016, playing a role in the film Pitch. In 2019, she starred in the film The Bull by Boris Akopov, for her role in which she was nominated for the Golden Eagle Award.

=== Personal life ===
In May 2026, Miloslavskaya married footballer Yegor Ushakov.

== Selected filmography ==
Year	Title	Role	Notes
2016	Pitch	Nastya	(ru)
2019	The Bull	Tanya	(ru)
2020	One Breath	Anya Gordeeva	
2020	Call-center	Olya	
2020	Streltsov	Alla Demenko	
2020	On the Edge	Kira Egorova	
2020	Fire	Ekaterina 'Katya' Sokolova	
2021	Russian South	Ksenia 'Ksyusha' Gordeeva	
2022	In From the Cold	Anya (young Jenny)	Main cast (season 1)
2024	Kombinaciya	Tanya Dolganova	
2025	Krasavitsa	Anna	
2026	Chuzhie dengi	Alina	
