= Streltsov (film) =

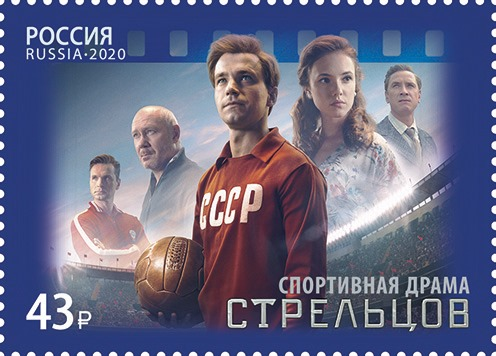
- 2020 Russian stamp dedicated to the film
- Directed by: Ilya Uchitel
- Written by: Konstantin Chelidze
- Produced by: Aleksey Uchitel; Rafael Minasbekyan; Leonid Vereshchagin (ru); Anton Zlatopolskiy (ru); Pavel Gorin; Filipp Pastukhov; Mikhail Shchukin
- Starring: Alexander Petrov; Stasya Miloslavskaya; Aleksandr Yatsenko; Vitaliy Khaev; Viktor Dobronravov
- Cinematography: Morad Abdel Fattah
- Edited by: Aleksandr Koshelev; Dmitriy Korabelnikov
- Music by: Savva Rozanov
- Production companies: Central Partnership; Rock Films; Russia-1; TriTe Studio
- Distributed by: Central Partnership
- Release date: 24 September 2020
- Running time: 101 minutes
- Country: Russia
- Language: Russian

Streltsov (Russian: Стрельцов) is a 2020 Russian biographical sports drama film directed by Ilya Uchitel.

It was theatrically released in Russia on 24 September 2020 by Central Partnership.

== Plot ==
The film tells about the Soviet footballer, Eduard Streltsov, and his difficult path to national fame.

== Cast ==
- Alexander Petrov as Eduard Streltsov
- Stasya Miloslavskaya as Alla Streltsova (wife of Eduard)
- Aleksandr Yatsenko as Yuri Postnikov
- Vitaliy Khaev as Viktor Maslov
- Viktor Dobronravov as Artyomov
- Aleksey Morozov as Dobrovolskiy
- Nadezhda Markina as Sofia Streltsova (mother of Eduard)
- Efim Petrunin as Valentin Ivanov
- Asya Domskaya as Marina
- Vladimir Bolshov as Gavriil Kachalin
- Vasiliy Mishchenko as Nikita Khrushchev
- Aleksey Kolgan as Leonid Brezhnev
- Daniel Barnes as a foreign journalist

== See also ==
- In the Сonstellation of Streltsov (2017 TV mini-series)
