= Yulia Peresild =

Russian cosmonaut and actress (born 1984)

- Юлия Пересильд
- Peresild in 2018
- Born: Yulia Sergeyevna Peresild; 5 September 1984 (age 42); Pskov, Russian SFSR, Soviet Union
- Education: Theatre of Nations; Malaya Bronnaya Theatre
- Occupations: Actress; singer
- Years active: 2003–present
- Height: 1.68 m (5 ft 6 in)
- Spouse: Alexei Uchitel (m. 2008; div. 2021) Mikhail Troynik (m. 2023)
- Children: 2, including Anna Peresild
- Space career

Spaceflight participant
- Time in space: 11 days, 16 hours, 13 minutes
- Missions: Soyuz MS-19 / Soyuz MS-18
- Awards: 8th Golden Eagle Awards (2010); 14th Golden Eagle Awards (2016)
- Website: Юлия Пересильд

Yulia Sergeyevna Peresild (Russian: Юлия Сергеевна Пересильд, romanized: Yuliya Sergeyevna Peresil'd; born 5 September 1984) is a Russian actress, singer, and cosmonaut.

Leading actress of the Malaya Bronnaya Theatre. Participant of a space flight within the framework of the scientific and educational project The Challenge: The First in Space, during which she participated in the filming of episodes of the 2023 feature film The Challenge. During her spaceflight to the ISS in October 2021 she became the first professional actress to act in outer space. She became the fifth woman in the history of the Soviet Union and Russia to travel into space, and the second to work and live on the ISS.

== Early life and education ==
Peresild was born in Pskov, Russian SFSR, Soviet Union. Her father was an icon painter and her mother was a kindergarten worker. Her surname comes from her Estonian paternal great-grandparents, who were deported to the Russian SFSR. In 2001 she graduated from secondary school No. 24 in the city of Pskov. After school, she entered the Faculty of Russian Philology of the Pskov State Pedagogical Institute, but after studying for only one year, she went to Moscow and entered a theater university.

In 2006, she graduated from the acting department of the directing department of the Russian Academy of Theatre Arts.

Since 2007, as a guest actress, she began to participate in the performances of the State Theatre of Nations.

Collaborates with the Moscow Theater "School of the Modern Play", the Malaya Bronnaya Theatre in Moscow, as well as with the Theater Company of Yevgeny Mironov.

== Career ==
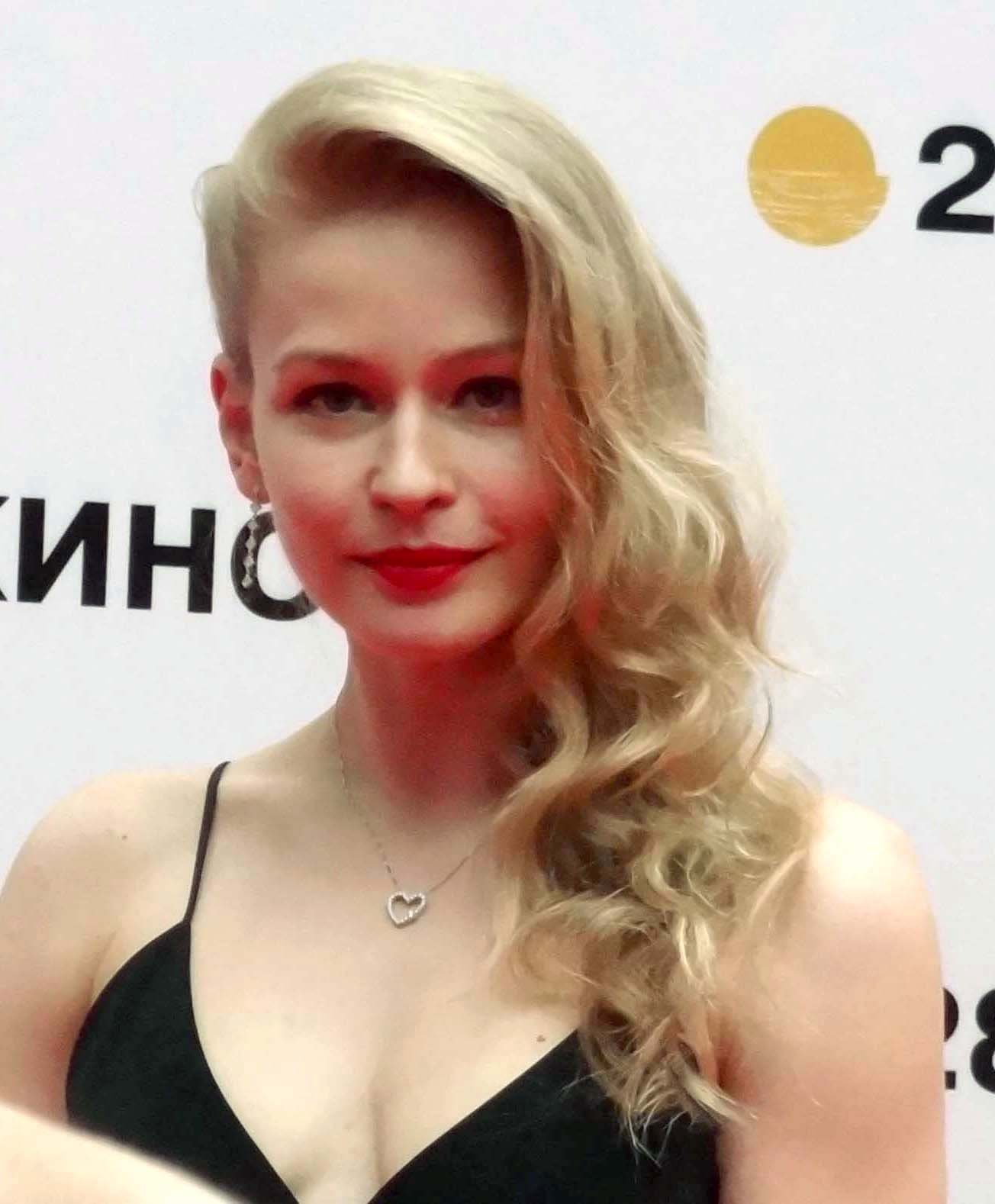
Peresild at the 2017 Kinotavr festival in Sochi

Her acting debut was the role of Natasha Kublakova in the 2003 television series Land, directed by Aleksandr Baranov.

Her first big work in film was the role of Olya Rodyashina in the drama film The Bride (2006) directed by Elyor Ishmukhamedov, and Captive (2008) directed by Alexei Uchitel.

However, her real breakthrough roles included the main role of Sofia in the drama The Edge (2010) directed by Alexei Uchitel, the television series Santa Lucia (2012), and the mystical thriller Sonnentau (2012). Peresild became well known after playing supporting roles in In the Fog (2012) directed by Sergei Loznitsa, and she played the role of Soviet Sniper Lyudmila Pavlichenko in the 2015 biographical war film Battle for Sevastopol.

=== Filming in outer space ===
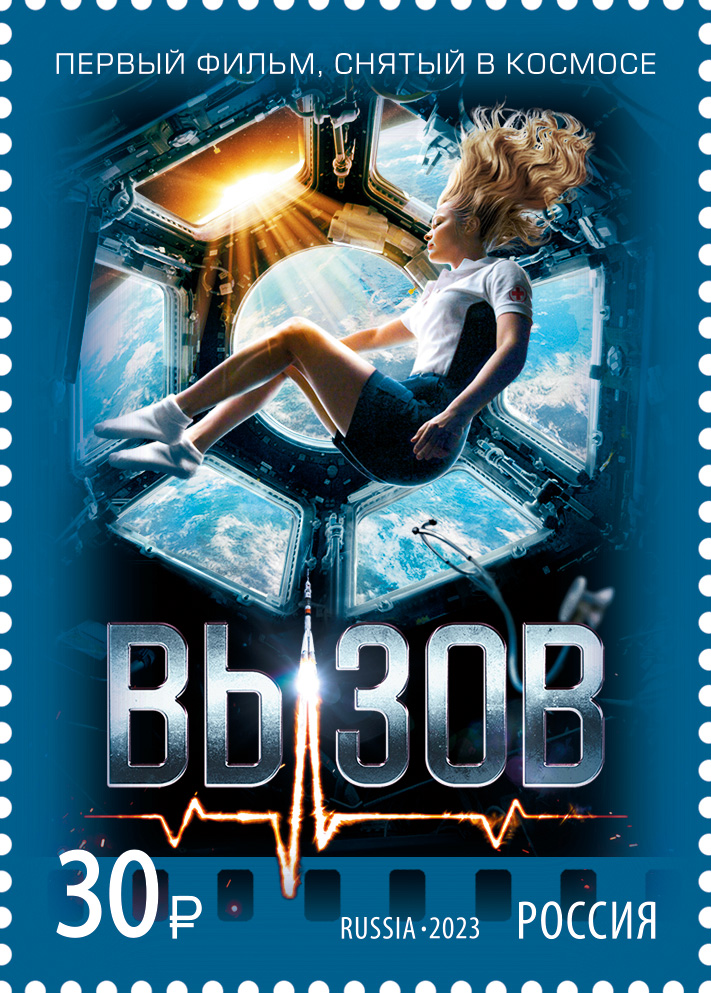
Russian stamp dedicated to the film The Challenge

She was selected as a member of the crew of Soyuz MS-19, which launched on 5 October 2021, in order to shoot the film The Challenge (2023 film) with Klim Shipenko. Her name was chosen from a shortlist of 20 actresses, and was announced on 14 May 2021. On 17 October, she returned to Earth on board Soyuz MS-18.

== Personal life ==
For many years Peresild had an affair with a married Russian film director Alexei Uchitel with whom she has two daughters, born in 2009 and 2012. Alexei Uchitel’s divorce from his wife is not officially registered, because in addition to personal, they are also connected by business relations. In 2021, Peresild announced that she had broken up with him.

In 2022, Yulia Peresild confirmed that she is in a relationship with actor Mikhail Troynik. and they were married in 2023.

She is a founding member of the charity foundation Galchonok (Russian: Галчонок), which works to provide treatment for children with organic central nervous system disorders.

== Selected filmography ==
=== Film ===
Year	Title	Role	Notes
2006	The Bride	Olya Rodyashina	
2008	Captive	Nastya	
2008	Once Upon a Time in the Provinces	Anastasiya Vladimirovna Zvonnikova	
2008	Virtual Alice	Anna Kochergina	
2009	Crush	Ira	
2010	The Abduction	Elena	
2010	The Edge	Sofia	
2010	Decoy	Vera Pozdnyakova	
2011	Five Brides	Katya and Asya, twin sisters	
2012	In the Fog	Anelya	
2012	Marathon	Inna Antipova	
2013	What Girls Don't Talk About	Yulya	
2013	Paradjanov	Svetlana Shcherbatyuk, wife of Sergey Parajanov	
2013	Weekend	Inga, secretary	
2015	Battle for Sevastopol	Lyudmila Pavlichenko	
2016	The Heritage of Love	Masha Kulikova	
2016	I Am a Teacher	Anna Kurenkova	
2017	Cold Tango	Layma	
2018	A Rough Draft	Rose White	
2019	Dark like the Night. Karenina-2019	Karenina	short film
2020	The Three	Veronika	
2021	Petrov's Flu	Marina	
2021	Sheena 667	Olya	
2021	Milk	Zoya	
2023	The Challenge	Evgenia Vladimirovna "Zhenya" Belyaeva	shot in space
2024	The Bremen Town Musicians	the Troubadour's mother	
2025	Finist. The First Warrior	Baba Yaga in youth	
2025	License to Love	Katerina	
2026	Krasavitsa	Evdokia Ivanovna Dashina	
2026	Rise of the Empire	Anna Mons	

=== Television ===
Year	Title	Role	Notes
2003	Land	Natasha Kublakova	TV series
2005	Yesenin	Katya Esenina	TV series
2006	Enchanted land	Natasha Kublakova	TV series
2007	Cobweb	Dasha Averina	TV series
2007	The Saboteur 2: The End of the War	Svetik	TV series
2011	The Matter of Store No. 1	Masha Skachko	TV series
2011	Summer of Wolves	Tosya	Mini-series
2012	Santa Lucia	Vika Saykina	TV series
2012	Sonnentau	Rita Pomyalovskaya, journalist	TV series
2014	The Executioner	Nina	TV series
2015	Adult daughter	Albina Kolganova	TV series
2018	The Golden Horde	Ustinha	TV series
2020	Zuleikha Opens Her Eyes	Nastasya	TV series
2021	Mediator	Maria Rusakova	TV series

== Honors ==
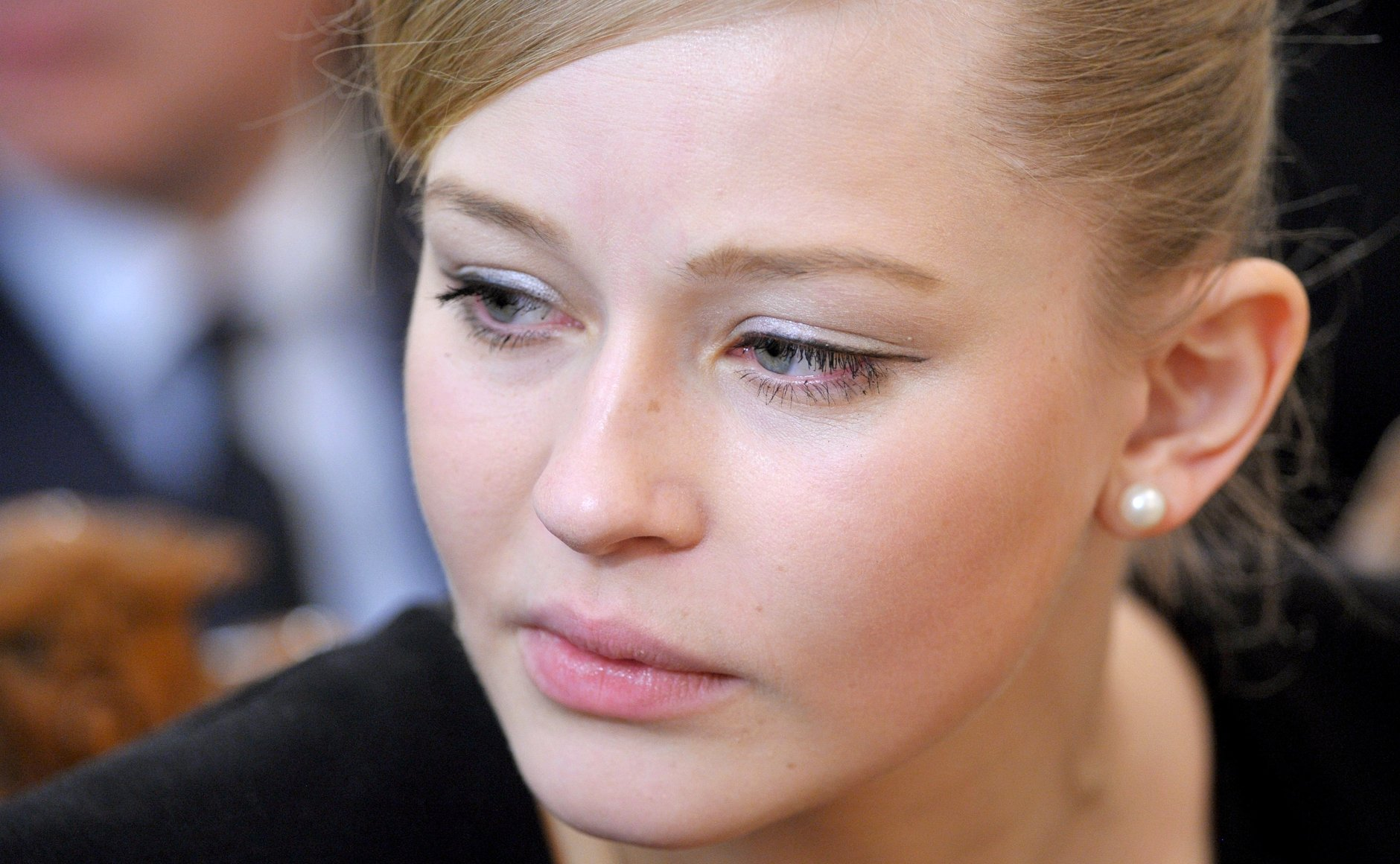
Peresild at the award ceremony of the President of the Russian Federation 2012 in the Kremlin (2013)

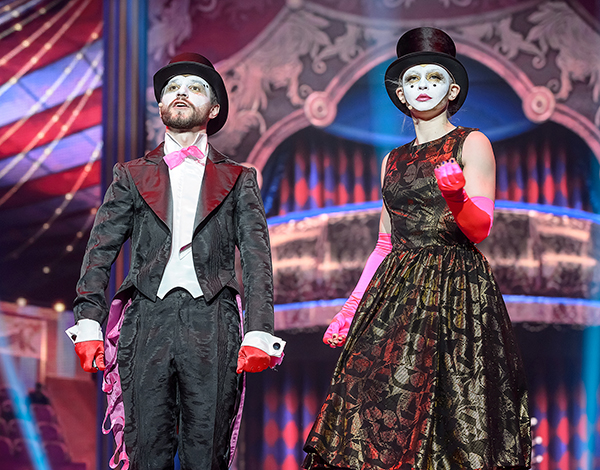
Pavel Akimkin and Yulia Peresild is the Golden Mask 2016.

- On March 15, 2013, Yulia Peresild was awarded the Russian President’s Prize for young cultural professionals and for works for children in 2012 "for her contribution to the development of the national theater and cinema art", at the presentation of which on March 25, 2013, President of the Russian Federation Vladimir Putin said:

Yulia Peresild is the owner of a bright acting talent, a worthy successor to the traditions of Russian psychological theater. Her art is filled with sincerity and heartfelt openness, diligence is combined with a sense of responsibility to art and the audience.

- 2018 — Merited Artist of the Russian Federation — for her great contribution to the development of national culture and art, many years of fruitful activity.
- 2023 — State Prize of the Russian Federation in the field of literature and art in 2022 (June 12, 2023) — for the creation of the feature film The Challenge.

=== Public awards and prizes ===
- The Golden Eagle award for the best actress in a supporting role (in The Edge, 2010)
- Best actress award at the first BRICS Film Festival (2015)
- Best actress award at the fifth Beijing International Film Festival (2015)
- The Golden Eagle award for the best actress (in Battle for Sevastopol, 2016)
