= Coma (2020 film) =

- Directed by: Nikita Argunov
- Screenplay by: Nikita Argunov; Aleksey Gravitskiy; Timofei Dekin
- Produced by: Sarik Andreasyan; Gevond Andreasyan; Armen Ananikyan; Ruben Dishdishyan; Rafael Minasbekyan; Nikolay Larionov
- Starring: Rinal Mukhametov; Lyubov Aksyonova; Anton Pampushnyy; Milos Bikovic; Konstantin Lavronenko
- Cinematography: Sergey Dyshuk
- Edited by: Nikita Argunov; Viktor Sviridenko
- Music by: Ilya Andrus
- Production companies: Big Cinema House; Fresh Film; Group of Companies Gpm Kit; Mars Media Entertainment
- Distributed by: Central Partnership
- Release date: January 30, 2020
- Running time: 111 min
- Country: Russia
- Language: Russian
- Budget: ₽352.5 million $4 million
- Box office: $4,264,162

Coma (Russian: Кома, romanized: Koma) is a 2020 Russian science fiction action film directed by Nikita Argunov. It was released on January 30, 2020 by Central Partnership.

== Plot summary ==
"Coma" follows the story of a talented architect who, after a mysterious accident, awakens in a dystopian world. This reality is a labyrinthine space composed of the memories, dreams, and subconscious thoughts of those in comas. In this surreal and fragmented landscape, physical laws are inconsistent, and cities and technologies from various eras coexist. The architect learns he can shape reality with his thoughts but struggles to distinguish between the world of 'Coma' and the real world. As he navigates this perplexing realm, he must confront the implications of his newfound abilities while uncovering the truth behind the coma world's existence.

== Cast ==
- Rinal Mukhametov as Viktor / The Architect
- Lyubov Aksyonova as "Fly"
- Anton Pampushnyy as "Phantom"
- Milos Bikovic as "Astronomer"
- Konstantin Lavronenko as Yan
- Polina Kuzminskaya as "Spirit"
- Rostislav Gulbis as "Gnome"
- Vilen Babichev as "Tank"
- Albert Kobrovsky as “Alba”
- Leonid Timtsunik as "Kabel"
