= Yura Borisov =

Russian actor (born 1992)

- Юра Борисов
- Borisov at the 2026 New York Film Festival
- Born: Yuri Alexandrovich Borisov; 8 December 1992 (age 33); Reutov, Moscow Oblast, Russia
- Education: Mikhail Shchepkin Higher Theatre School
- Occupation: Actor
- Years active: 2010–present
- Spouse: Anna Borisova
- Children: 2

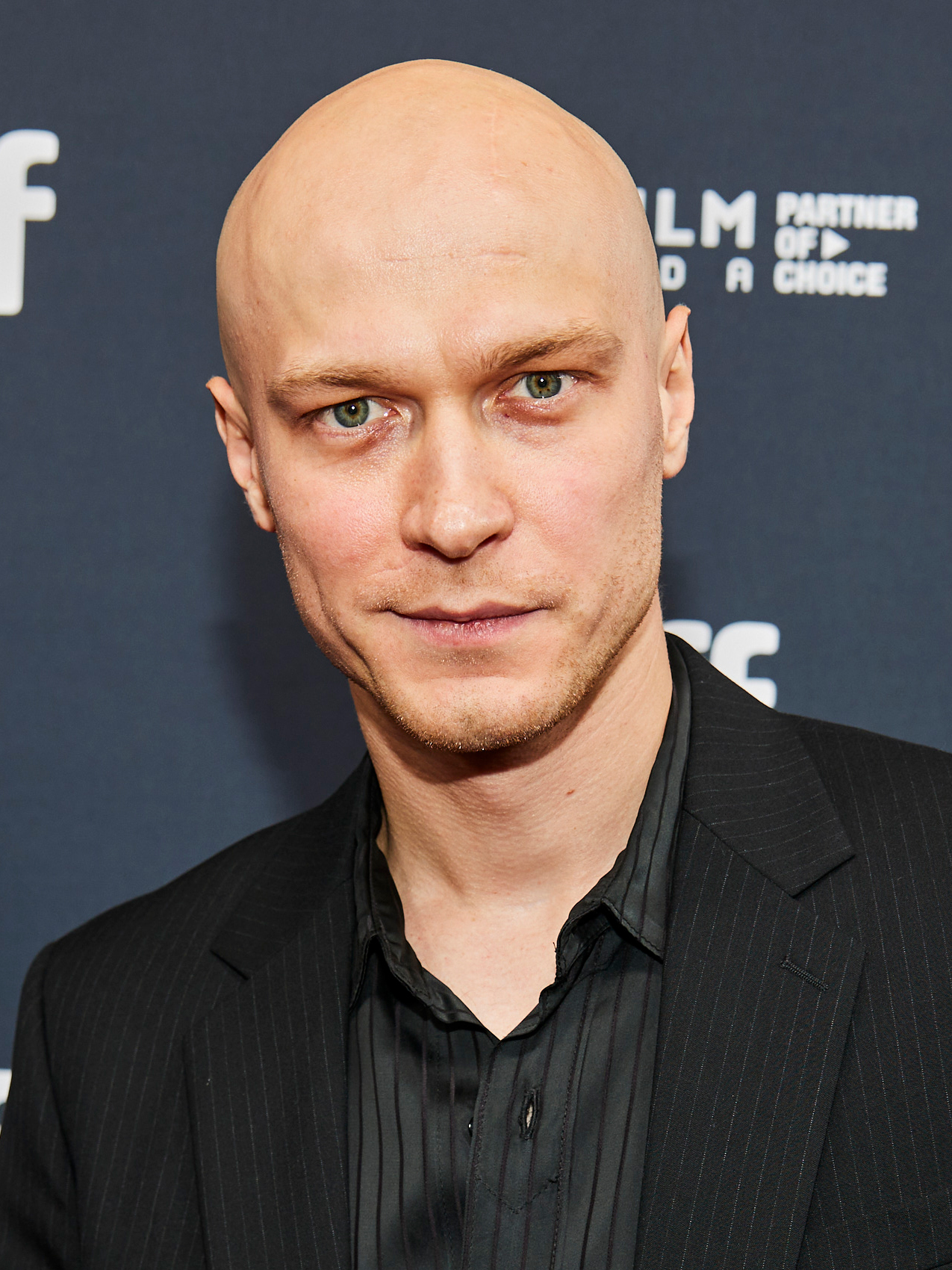
Borisov at the 2024 Toronto International Film Festival

Yuri Alexandrovich Borisov (Note: In this name that follows East Slavic naming customs, the patronymic is Alexandrovich and the family name is Borisov.) (Note: Russian: Ю́рий Алекса́ндрович Бори́сов, romanized: Yuriy Aleksandrovich Borisov) (born 8 December 1992), better known by the diminutive Yura (Note: Russian: Юра.), is a Russian actor. He made his acting debut in the crime drama Elena (2011) and then won a Golden Eagle Award for his portrayal of Mikhail Kalashnikov in the biopic AK-47 (2020). He also starred in the films The Bull (2019), The Silver Skates (2020), Compartment No. 6 (2021), and Captain Volkonogov Escaped (2021). For his international breakthrough performance in the American film Anora (2024), he was nominated for several awards, including the Academy Award for Best Supporting Actor.

== Early life ==
Borisov was born in Reutov, Moscow Oblast, near Moscow and is of Russian origins. In 2014 he graduated from the Shchepkin Higher Theater School, and won the Golden Leaf award in the Best Actor category for the role of Alexander Tarasovich Ametistov in the play Zoyka's Apartment.

== Career ==
Borisov started working as a film actor in 2010, and played main roles in various television series. In 2013–14, he worked at the Moscow theater Satyricon.

In 2019, he starred in the film The Bull, for which he was nominated for the 18th Golden Eagle Awards 2020 in the category Best Leading Actor, and also received an award "Event of the Year" from the magazine "Kinoreporter" in the category "Discovery of the Year". He also played minor roles in the films T-34, Union of Salvation, and Invasion.

In February 2020, the film AK-47 was released, in which Borisov played the main role – Mikhail Kalashnikov, and received positive reviews from film critics. For this role he was awarded the Golden Eagle Award – 2021 for Best Leading Actor. He was the winner of the Golden Eagle Award in 2021. GQ Russia chose him as Actor of the Year in 2020.

In 2021, Borisov appeared in eight feature films, including the Netflix original film The Silver Skates. He also played the lead role in Juho Kuosmanen's Finnish-Russian film Compartment No. 6, which won the Grand Prix at the 2021 Cannes Film Festival.

In 2024, Borisov voiced Behemoth the Cat in The Master and Margarita, and played Igor in the Palme d'Or-winning film Anora, directed by Sean Baker. For his performance in the film, he received Best Supporting Actor nominations for the Academy Award, Actor Award, BAFTA Award, Critics' Choice Movie Award, and Golden Globe Award, in addition to the ensemble nominations at the Actor Awards and Critics' Choice Awards. With his Oscar nomination, Borisov became the first Russian to be nominated in an acting category in almost five decades, following Mikhail Baryshnikov's nomination in the same category in 1978.

== Filmography ==
Year	Title	Role	Notes	Ref.
2011	Elena	Sasha's friend		
2017	Ancestral Land	Stepan Morozov		
2018	Coach	FC Meteor fan		
2018	Crystal Swan	Alik		
2019	T-34	Serafim Ionov		
2019	The Bull	Anton Bykov		
2019	The Port	Romych		
2019	Union of Salvation	Anton Arbuzov		
2020	Invasion	Captain Ivan "Vanya" Korobanov		
2020	AK-47	Mikhail Kalashnikov		
2020	Peace! Love! Chewing Gum!	Alexander Volkov Jr.	TV series	
2020	The Silver Skates	Alexey "Alex" Tarasov		
2020	Has Anyone Seen My Girl?	Sergei		
2021	Compartment No. 6	Lyokha		
2021	Petrov's Flu	Sasha		
2021	Gerda	Oleg		
2021	Captain Volkonogov Escaped	Captain Volkonogov		
2021	The Riot	Pyotr		
2021	Mama, I'm Home	Zhenya		
2023	Centaur	Sasha		
2024	The Master and Margarita	Behemoth	Voice	
2024	One Hundred Years Ahead	Glot		
2024	Anora	Igor	English-language film	
2025	The Poet	Alexander Pushkin		
2025	This Summer Will End	Kesha		
2026	Battle of Engines	Dmitri Bondarev		
2026	Artificial	Ilya Sutskever	English-language film	
TBA	Arena †		Filming	

== Accolades ==
Year	Award	Category	Work	Result	Ref.
2013	Golden Leaf	Best Actor	Zoyka's Apartment	Won	
2020	Golden Eagle Award	Best Actor in a Motion Picture	The Bull	Nominated	
2020	Moscow International Film Festival	Chopard Talent Awards	The Bull	Won	
2020	Event of the year	Discovery of the year		Won	
2020	Journal Award GQ	Actor of the Year		Won	
2021	Golden Eagle Award	Best Actor in a Motion Picture	AK-47	Won	
2021	Nika Award	Best Supporting Actor	Silver Skates	Nominated	
2021	European Film Awards	European Actor	Compartment No. 6	Nominated	
2021	São Paulo International Film Festival	Best Actor	Compartment No. 6	Won	
2021	Valladolid International Film Festival	Best Actor	Compartment No. 6	Won	
2021	The Golden Unicorn Awards	Best Actor	Captain Volkonogov Escaped	Nominated	
2022	White Elephant	Best Leading Actor	Captain Volkonogov Escaped	Won	
2022	Jussi Awards	Best Actor	Compartment No. 6	Nominated	
2022	Russian Guild of Film Critics	Best Leading Actor	Compartment No. 6	Nominated	
2022	Jerusalem Film Festival	Best Leading Actor	Compartment No. 6	Nominated	
2022	International Cinephile Society Awards	Best Supporting Actor	Compartment No. 6	Nominated	
2024	Gotham Awards	Outstanding Supporting Performance	Anora	Nominated	
2024	Astra Film Awards	Best Supporting Actor	Anora	Nominated	
2024	Los Angeles Film Critics Association	Best Supporting Performance	Anora	Won (Note: shared with Kieran Culkin)	
2024	Chicago Film Critics Association	Best Supporting Actor	Anora	Nominated	
2024	San Francisco Bay Area Film Critics Circle	Best Supporting Actor	Anora	Won	
2024	Washington DC Area Film Critics Association	Best Supporting Actor	Anora	Nominated	
2024	Toronto Film Critics Association	Outstanding Supporting Performance	Anora	Won	
2024	Florida Film Critics Circle	Best Supporting Actor	Anora	Nominated	
2024	London Film Critics Circle	Supporting Actor of the Year	Anora	Nominated	
2024	Austin Film Critics Association	Best Supporting Actor	Anora	Won	
2025	Kansas City Film Critics Circle	Best Supporting Actor	Anora	Runner-up	
2025	Alliance of Women Film Journalists	Best Supporting Actor	Anora	Nominated	
2025	Golden Globe Awards	Best Supporting Actor – Motion Picture	Anora	Nominated	
2025	Online Film Critics Society	Best Supporting Actor	Anora	Nominated	
2025	Critics' Choice Movie Awards	Best Supporting Actor	Anora	Nominated	
2025	Critics' Choice Movie Awards	Best Acting Ensemble	Anora	Nominated	
2025	Vancouver Film Critics Circle	Best Supporting Actor	Anora	Nominated	
2025	Actor Awards	Outstanding Performance by a Male Actor in a Supporting Role	Anora	Nominated	
2025	Actor Awards	Outstanding Performance by a Cast in a Motion Picture	Anora	Nominated	
2025	Satellite Awards	Best Actor in a Supporting Role	Anora	Nominated	
2025	Independent Spirit Awards	Best Supporting Performance	Anora	Nominated	
2025	British Academy Film Awards	Best Actor in a Supporting Role	Anora	Nominated	
2025	Academy Awards	Best Supporting Actor	Anora	Nominated	

== See also ==
- List of Academy Award winners and nominees from Russia
- List of European Academy Award winners and nominees
- List of actors with Academy Award nominations
- List of actors nominated for Academy Awards for non-English performances
