= Andrey Burkovsky =

Russian actor (born 1983)

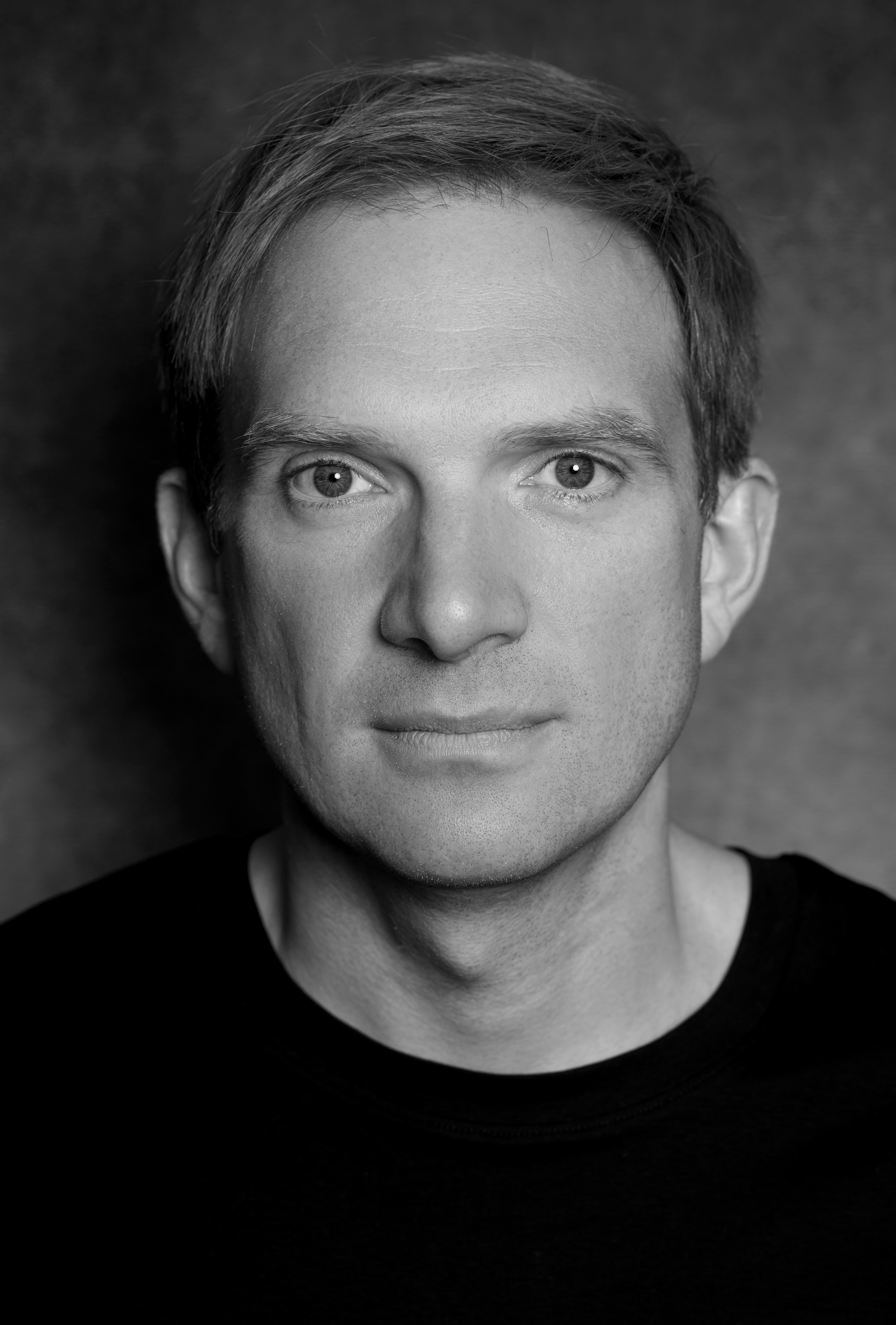
- Headshot of Andrey Burkovskiy
- Born: November 14, 1983 (age 42); Tomsk, RSFSR, USSR
- Occupations: Actor, comedian
- Years active: 2000 – present

Andrey Vladimirovich Burkovsky (Russian: Андрей Владимирович Бурковский; born November 14, 1983) is a Russian actor and a former KVN member of «Maximum» team. Since 2014, he has been an actor of the Moscow Art Theatre He is known for starring in Start original series Mediator and Let's youngers (Даёшь молодёжь!).

== Life and career ==
Burkovsky was born in Tomsk. In 2000, after graduating from school, he entered the Law Institute of Tomsk State University, graduating in 2005.

In 2010, Burkovsky entered the Moscow Art Theatre School for the course of Igor Zolotovitsky and Sergei Zemtsov. He graduated in 2014.

In 2016, Andrey Burkovsky enjoys playing ice hockey in his spare time.

In 2022, Burkovsky and his family moved to Los Angeles. In January 2023, he performed a role in Aleksandr Molochnikov's theatrical production of Chekhov in the Chelsea in the United States.

However, the artist continued to be a member of the Moscow Art Theater troupe until August 2023.

=== Television ===
At the beginning of 2009, together with his KVN teammate Mikhail Bashkatov, he was invited to the cast of the sketch-comedy series Give Youth! (Russian: ДаЁшь молодЁжь) which aired originally on STS channel, where he played the metrosexual Danila Fox, the gopnik Rzhavy, the policeman Vyushkin and the young spouse Valera, as well as a number of other characters. The show lasted for 9 seasons.

In 2012, Burkovsky got the role of Ilya in the sitcom Kitchen on the STS channel, where he appeared for the first two seasons.

Since March 2016, he has been the host of the Not Fact program on the Zvezda TV channel.

On October 1, 2016, Ice Age ice skating competition show returned to Channel One, and among the participants was Andrey. His partner in the project was the famous figure skater Tatiana Navka.

In 2021 Burkovsky starred in the lead role of Mediator, a Start original crime drama series about a manipulative negotiator Andrei Pavlov who saves hostages and people who attempt suicide. Two seasons have been released.

In 2022 Burkovsky starred in Amore More - a dramedy series about poly-amorous relationships.

=== Family ===
- Father - Tomsk businessman Vladimir Grigorievich Burkovsky.
- Mother - Burkovskaya Lyudmila Ivanovna, owner of the restaurants "Eternal Call" and "Hmel" in the city of Tomsk.
- Brother - Alexander. On January 8, 2009, at the age of 23, he crashed at a ski resort in Sheregesh in the Kemerovo region (while skiing, he crashed into a tree at full speed, as a result of which he received multiple injuries which led to his death).
  - Wife - Olga Burkovskaya (the wedding took place on August 29, 2008).
  - Children: March 14, 2011 son Maxim was born. On June 5, 2013, daughter Alisa was born.

=== Controversy ===
In 2016, Andrey Burkovsky together with dancing partner Tatiana Navka drew ire from the public as they appeared in Ice Age - the Russian version of Dancing on Ice dressed as Holocaust concentration camp prisoners. Burkovsky and Navka said that the dance was inspired by the 1997 film Life Is Beautiful and was not meant to cause offense.

== Filmography and theater ==
=== Filmography ===
Year	Title (original)	Role	Notes
2009–2013	Give Youth! (ДаЁшь молодЁжь!)	Various (trainer; dentist; gopnik Rzhavy; metrosexual Danila Fox; father Valera; policeman Vyushkin; vampire Denis; chairman of “Young Russia”)	Television sketch-comedy
2010	One for All (Одна за всех)	Assistant to the president	Television
2013–2014	Kitchen (Кухня)	Ilya Vladimirovich, waiter	Television; seasons 2–3
2013–2015	The Last of the Magikyans (Последний из Магикян)	Yegor Nikolayevich Shcherbakov	Television; seasons 1–5
2015	Boarding House "Skazka", or Miracles Included (Пансионат «Сказка», или Чудеса включены)	Andrey	Television
2015	Bet on Love (Ставка на любовь)	Kostya	Feature film
2015	Society of Anonymous Optimists (Общество анонимных оптимистов)	Boris	Short film
2016	Pushkin (Пушкин)	Grigory Baranov, film producer	Television/mini-series
2017	Adaptation (Адаптация)	Roman	Television; season 1
2017	Furious (Легенда о Коловрате)	Rostislav	Feature film
2017	Yolki 6 (Ёлки новые)	Igor	Feature film
2018	Call DiCaprio! (Звоните ДиКаприо!)	Lev Ivanovsky	Television
2018	Tobol (Тобол)	Johan Gustav Renat	Feature film
2018	KVNshchiki (КВНщики)	cameo	Television
2019	Sober Driver (Трезвый водитель)	Stanislav	Feature film
2020	Deadly Illusions (Смертельные иллюзии)	Denis Romanov	Feature film
2020	An Hour Before the Dawn (За час до рассвета)	Capt. Denis “Ptakha” Zhuravlyov	Television
2020	The Babe! (Красотка в ударе)	Ilya, plastic surgeon	Feature film
2020	For the First Guy You Meet (За первого встречного)	Anton Ignatyev	Feature film
2020	Doctor Liza (Доктор Лиза)	Maj. Sergei Kolesov (FSKN)	Feature film
2020	A Good Man (Хороший человек)	Boris Lebedev	Television
2020	Passengers (Пассажиры)	Nikita	Television; episode 5
2021	Mediator (Медиатор)	Andrei Pavlov	Television
2021	Milk (Молоко)	Seryozha	Feature film
2021	Bender: The Final Hustle (Бендер: Последняя афера)	Crowley, illusionist	Feature film
2021	The Official (Чиновник)	Maxim Eduardovich	Feature film
2021	The Sun Line (Солнечная линия)	Husband	TV film / feature (as released)
2022	Amore More	Georgy	Television
2022	Tchaikovsky’s Wife (Жена Чайковского)	Vladimir Meshchersky	Feature film
2022	Nina (Нина)	Kostya	Television/feature (as released)
2022	I’m on Rewind! (Я на перемотке!)	Maxim	Feature film
2023	Frozen Land (Мёрзлая земля)	Vladislav Aydarov	Feature film
2023	Lord of the Wind (Повелитель ветра)	Rakitin	Feature film
2024	The Flying Ship (Летучий корабль)	Paul	Feature film
2025	Moscow Does Not Believe in Tears: A New Beginning (Москва слезам не верит. Всё только начинается)	TBA	Announced
2025	Clown Story	COCO	Short film; Motherfather Production. New York

=== Theatre ===
Year (premiere)	Play (original)	Role	Venue/Notes
2011	Snow White and the Seven Dwarfs (Белоснежка и семь гномов)	Royal wishes executor	Moscow Art Theatre
2011	The Master and Margarita (Мастер и Маргарита)	Georges Bengalsky	Moscow Art Theatre
2013	The Pickwick Club (Пиквикский клуб)	President of the Court	Moscow Art Theatre
2013	An Ideal Husband. A Comedy (Идеальный муж. Комедия)	Moloch/TV diva	Moscow Art Theatre
2014	No. 13D (№ 13D) by Ray Cooney	Waiter	Moscow Art Theatre.
2014	Leading Ladies (Примадонны) by Ken Ludwig	Leo Clark	Moscow Art Theatre
2015	The Musketeers. Saga. Part One (Мушкетёры. Сага. Часть первая)	Porthos	Moscow Art Theatre
2016	Central Park West (350 Сентрал-парк Вест, New York, NY 10025) by Woody Allen	Howard	Moscow Art Theatre
2017	Sun Line (Солнечная линия)	Verder	Meyerhold Theatre Center (Театр имени Мейерхольда, Moscow)
2018	The Sun Rises. An Evening dedicated to Gorky (Солнце всходит. Вечер Горького)	actor	Moscow Art Theatre
2018	The Man from the Fish (Человек из рыбы)	Benoît	Moscow Art Theatre
2019	Run (Бег) by Mikhail Bulgakov	Sergey Pavlovich Golubkov	Moscow Art Theatre
2024	Our Class	Menakhem	Production MART Foundation and Arlekin Players Theatre; BAM/Classic Stage Company (New York)
2024	The Dybbuk (Диббук)	The Dybbuk/Khonen	Arlekin Players Theatre; Vilna Shul, Boston
2025	Seagull: True Story	MC/Barry	La MaMa Experimental Theatre Club, New York
