= Ivi.ru =

Russian online video streaming service

ivi.ru
- Company type: Private
- Available in: Russian
- Area served: Russia & CIS
- Owners: ru-Net Holdings Limited; Baring Vostok Capital Partners; ProfMedia; Tiger Global; Frontier Ventures; Oleg Tumanov
- Creators: Oleg Tumanov; Dmitry Alimov
- CEO: Nikolay Vasilkov
- Industry: Russian Internet-based media company
- Employees: 150
- Divisions: ivi.ru music.ivi.ru deti.ivi.ru ivi.tv
- Website: ivi.ru
- Registration: Not required
- Users: 46,8million visitors per month
- Launched: February 26, 2010
- Current status: Active

IVI (ivi.ru) is a Russian online video streaming service that offers licensed video content, including movies, TV shows, cartoons, and music videos.

The platform provides licensed content from major producers such as Mosfilm, Lenfilm, Paradise, CTC Media, Gorky Film Studio, Warner Bros/Warner Music, Paramount Pictures, Sony Pictures/Sony Music, NBCUniversal/Universal Music, Disney, BBC, STV, Central Partnership, and others. It was one of the first legal video services in Russia.

ivi.ru is accessible on various devices, including smartphones and tablets running operating systems such as iOS, Android, Windows Phone, Symbian, and Bada. It is also compatible with Smart TVs from leading manufacturers, including Samsung, LG, Philips, and Panasonic.

== History ==
ivi.ru was launched on February 26, 2010, attracting more than 180,000 users on its first day, making it one of the most successful start-ups among Russian Internet companies. At the time, ivi.ru was owned by its founder, Oleg Tumanov, and Leonid Boguslavsky's company, ru-Net. In 2010, Vladimir Potanin's media holding company, ProfMedia, joined as a financial investor. In 2011, ivi.ru secured additional funding from the international technology investment fund Tiger Global Management.

In 2012, the streaming service raised $40 million in another round of funding. The investment came from Baring Vostok, a private equity firm, along with existing investors ru-Net, Tiger Group, ProfMedia, and Frontier Ventures. The funds were used to enhance the company’s technology and expand its content catalogue.

In 2021, the company attracted $250 million in investment from major state and private investors.

In 2022, it underwent a rebranding: the logo was changed to the Cyrillic “Иви”, and the names of its Android, iOS, and Smart TV apps were updated from “ivi” to “Иви”.

In 2025, the service launched its streaming platform in Turkey.

== Content ==
ivi.ru aims to discourage the proliferation of illegal video and music content among Russian Internet users by promoting and offering high-quality, easily accessible licensed videos free of malware.

Approximately 97% of the content on ivi.ru is available free of charge and can be accessed without registration. The remaining 3% consists of the latest movie premieres and top titles from major studios’ catalogues, which can be viewed by subscribing to the premium ivi+ service.

In 2012, ivi.ru became the first online video service in Europe to stream licensed content from all major Hollywood producers.

In 2022, the service expanded its catalogue of series from South Korea and Turkey.

== Original programming ==
Since 2018, the service has produced original series and movies. In 2019, it established its own production unit, Ivi Originals, to develop films and television series.

On July 1, 2021, the platform premiered a Russian remake of the American series Awake. By the end of the year, the project ranked among the service’s top five in both unique viewers and total views.

On November 4, 2021, the series Vezet premiered on the platform and, within its first four days, recorded the strongest debut of any Ivi Originals project. After its finale, the comedy had been watched by more than two million viewers on the platform, and including its television broadcast, its total audience exceeded 30 million.

In 2022, the Ivi Originals series Hello Again! became the platform’s most successful Russian launch: it was viewed by over 350,000 households during its first weekend and subsequently reached 1.5 million viewers in record time.

== Owners and management ==
The streaming service is owned by the Cyprus-based company Ivi.ru Media Limited.

Oleg Tumanov founded the company and served as its Chief Executive Officer from its inception until April 15, 2022.

Since April 15, 2022, the position of CEO has been held by Nikolay Vasilkov, who previously served as Tumanov’s deputy.

== Financial performance ==
In 2014, the service attracted 30 million unique users and recorded 200 million total views.

In 2020, its audience reached 59.5 million unique monthly users, and revenue totaled 8.8 billion RUB.

In 2023, revenue rose to 16.6 billion RUB.

In 2024, revenue amounted to 22.9 billion RUB.

By 2025, the number of active users stood at 10 million.

== Awards ==
- In 2019, the company ranked tenth in Forbes Russia’s “Top 20 Most Valuable Runet Companies.”
- In 2021, Ivi was named the Best Media Employer by Forbes Russia.
- In 2022, 2023, and 2024, the company was included in Forbes Russia’s “Top 30 Most Valuable Runet Companies.”
