= Stalingrad (2013 film) =

- Theatrical release poster
- Directed by: Fedor Bondarchuk
- Written by: Ilya Tilkin; Sergey Snezhkin
- Produced by: Alexander Rodnyansky; Dmitriy Rudovskiy; Sergey Melkumov; Natalia Gorina; Steve Schklair (3D Producer)
- Starring: Petr Fedorov; Yanina Studilina; Dmitriy Lysenkov; Alexey Barabash; Andrey Smolyakov; Maria Smolnikova; Vladimir Kurlovich; Thomas Kretschmann; Heiner Lauterbach; Daniel Moorehead; Sergey Bondarchuk
- Cinematography: Maksim Osadchiy
- Edited by: Natalia Gorina
- Music by: Angelo Badalamenti
- Production companies: Columbia Pictures; Art Pictures Studio; Non-Stop Production
- Distributed by: Sony Pictures Releasing
- Release dates: 27 September 2013 (Volgograd); 10 October 2013 (Russia)
- Running time: 131 minutes
- Country: Russia
- Languages: Russian; German
- Budget: $30 million
- Box office: $68.1 million

Stalingrad (Сталинград) is a 2013 Russian war film directed by Fedor Bondarchuk. It was the first Russian movie released in IMAX. The film was released in September 2013 in Volgograd (formerly Stalingrad) and October in Russia before its international release in subsequent months (all releases were handled by the foreign-language arm of Columbia Pictures). The film was selected as the Russian entry for the Best Foreign Language Film at the 86th Academy Awards, but it was not nominated. Stalingrad received the I3DS (International 3D and Advanced Imaging Society) Jury Award for Russia in 2014.

The film is a love story set in November 1942 during the Battle of Stalingrad, three months into the six month battle that caused nearly 2,000,000 total casualties (wounded, killed, captured) for the two opponents, including tens of thousands of Russian civilians. The story follows soldiers from both sides as they fight to survive while saving the lives of their loves, and struggle with retaining their humanity in the face of certain death and the unspeakable horrors of war.

== Plot ==
In 2011, after the Tōhoku earthquake, emergency personnel work to reach some victims trapped underground; one rescuer tells the victims the story of how he came to have five fathers, all killed during the Great Patriotic War (World War II).

In 1942, during the Battle of Stalingrad, a small group of Russian soldiers takes cover in a large residential building crossing the Volga River. Five soldiers, the "five fathers": Polyakov ("Angel"), embittered after losing his wife and daughter; Chvanov, driven by hatred for the Germans due to their cruelty; Nikiforov, a former tenor turned brutal fighter; Sergey, a spotter; and Captain Gromov, a veteran leader, find a young girl named Katya living alone in the building after her family was killed. As they spend days together, they grow fond of each other.

German encampment near a crossing is led by Hauptmann Kahn, a decorated but disillusioned soldier who falls in love with Masha, a Russian woman resembling his late wife. She initially detests him but reciprocates his love despite language barriers. Oberstleutnant Henze arrives to command, chiding Kahn for his attraction and failure to eliminate Russian soldiers. Henze sets an example by burning a woman and her daughter alive after rounding up Russian civilians, sparking an ambush that kills several Germans and Russians. The two sides retreat, and one day, Chvanov teaches Katya to aim her gun. She accidentally shoots a German, leading to retaliation and injury of Chvanov.

During a visit to Masha, Kahn promises to take her to safety when the time is right. On her 19th birthday, Katya receives a handmade cake from soldiers, with a song by Nikiforov, a famous singer she recognized earlier. She also gets a bath filled with hot water, a luxury since the siege began. Sergey takes Katya to an old lookout in an unoccupied building, and they spend the night together, becoming the story's narrator.

After Polyakov ricocheted an artillery shell into the German complex, Kahn is ordered to begin the attack on them; he takes Masha to an abandoned building, hoping to save her from the coming fight. As she begs him to stay with her, she is shot by Chvanov for being a collaborator, enraging Kahn. Nikiforov is taken captive by the Germans, where he manages to brutally stab Henze before being killed himself. Henze's death puts Kahn back in charge.

German reinforcements with tanks arrive, damaging Russian soldiers and their building. They fatally injure Chvanov. Kahn's soldiers attack, shooting Polyakov. Kahn finds Gromov on the second floor trying to use a radio; they shoot each other before collapsing. Sergey uses the radio to order an air strike on the building, now overrun by German soldiers. Katya watches as it is leveled, destroying everyone inside.

Back in the present day, the victims are freed from the building. The girl to whom Sergey (who had been named after his biological father) had told his story seeks him out, and they share a moment of understanding before he is driven away.

== Cast ==
- Pyotr Fyodorov as Capt. Gromov
- Dmitriy Lysenkov as Sgt. Chavanov
- Alexey Barabash as Nikiforov
- Andrey Smolyakov as Polyakov
- Sergey Bondarchuk Jr. as Junior Lt. Sergey Astakhov
- Oleg Volku as petty officer Krasnov
- Philippe Reinhardt as Gottfried
- Georges Devdariani as Klose
- Yanina Studilina as Masha
- Maria Smolnikova as Katya
- Thomas Kretschmann as Hauptmann Peter Kahn
- Heiner Lauterbach as Oberstleutnant Henze
- Polina Raikina as Natashka
- Yuriy Nazarov as Navodchik
- Daniel Moorehead as Sergey

== Background ==
The original script by Ilya Tilkin does not have any literary source. The screenwriter studied diaries of the participants of the Battle of Stalingrad. He also used museum archives, documents and recorded stories of its participants.

The prototype of this house is the legendary Pavlov's House in Stalingrad. On the eve of filming, the script was significantly rewritten by the director and screenwriter Sergey Snezhkin.

The plot seems to be somewhat influenced by Chapter 57 of Life And Fate, by writer and journalist Vasily Grossman, and therefore does have a literary antecedent.

== Production ==
The first part of filming took place in autumn 2011 and lasted 17 days. During that time, two key episodes of the battle were shot, in which 900 extras and historical reenactors took part in crowd scenes. The main shooting process began at the end of May 2012 and ran until 27 July 2012.

Colossal scenery was constructed especially for Stalingrad filming at the former factory "Krasny Treugolnik" in St. Petersburg, and the Third North Fort near Kronstadt. Every detail for the movie sets depicting the centre of Stalingrad and the east bank of the Volga were faithfully and painstakingly reproduced, reflecting the vast scale of the battle. The budget for its construction was more than 120 million rubles (US$3.5 million), and it took over 400 people working for 6 months to build. Unusually though, for all the attention to detail the film-makers took, the Panzers reproduced for a major scene late in the film were modeled on a much different later type of the German Mk.IV that did not enter service until around a year after the battle (the Mk.IV G/H)- a major oversight by the historical advisors and production team.

The film was produced in 3D using equipment provided by a Hollywood company, 3ality Technica. It was released in 3D, IMAX 3D, and 2D.

For the reason that I continue to work on this project, I read all the history of the Battle of Stalingrad. From "Stalingrad" by Antony Beevor and "In the Trenches of Stalingrad" by Nekrasov to "Iron Cross" by Wilhelm Heinrich and "Life and Fate" by Vasily Grossman.
– Fedor Bondarchuk, the director of Stalingrad

It is planned that all German speech will not be dubbed into Russian in favour of subtitles instead.

Fedor Bondarchuk and Thomas Kretschmann have already starred in films with the name Stalingrad around the same time. Kretschmann played a Leutnant in the 1993 German film, and Bondarchuk was in the 1989 Russian film, which was directed by Yuri Ozerov.

== Reception ==
=== Box office ===
In Russia, Stalingrad was a huge box office success earning a total of US$51,700,000, which set a new box office record for contemporary Russian films. It also set the record for opening weekend takings there, with a revenue of US$16,120,000. In the US, the movie grossed just over US$1,000,000. Overall, the film earned over $68 million worldwide.

It was the highest-grossing non-Hollywood, non-English language film in China until surpassed by India's PK in 2015.

=== Critical response ===
Reception of the film was mixed. It was praised for stunning visuals, sound editing, music, and acting, but at the same time criticized for direction and melodramatic plot. According to Russian review aggregator Kritikanstvo.ru, its average critical score in Russian media is 63 out of 100. Such media as Rossiyskaya Gazeta, Vedomosti, Izvestia, Kommersant, and Expert were positive about the film. Several others, including Argumenty i Fakty, Ogoniok, and web publicist Dmitry Puchkov gave negative reviews. Some critics were disappointed by the film's plot on patriotic grounds: they felt it did not pay sufficient tribute to the heroes of the Stalingrad battle, but rather concentrated too much on the love story.

According to VTsIOM poll, Stalingrad was the most popular film of 2013 in Russia. 12% of respondents named it as "Film of the year", which is far above 4% for the runner-up, sport drama Legend № 17.

On American film aggregation website Rotten Tomatoes, it has a 51% rating, with an average score of 5.6/10, based on reviews from 75 critics. The site's consensus states: "There's no arguing with its impressive production values, but Stalingrad should have devoted more attention to the screenplay and spent less on special effects-enhanced spectacle." On another American aggregation website, Metacritic, the film has a 49/100 (citing "mixed or average reviews"), based on reviews from 23 critics.

== See also ==
- Cinema of Russia
- List of submissions to the 86th Academy Awards for Best Foreign Language Film
- List of Russian submissions for the Academy Award for Best Foreign Language Film
