= List of Russian films of 2012 =

A list of films produced in Russia in 2012 (see 2012 in film).

== Film releases ==
Date	Title	Russian Title	Director	Cast	Genre(s)	Notes
December 17, 2011	Sapsan, I Love You	Сапсан, я люблю тебя	Igor Abidov	Viktor Shuralev; Viktoria Zabolotnaya; Olga Prikhodko	Melodrama	
January 2	My Boyfriend Is an Angel	Мой парень – ангел	Vera Storozheva	Artur Smolyaninov; Anna Starshenbaum; Sergei Puskepalis	Comedy	97 min, premiered on 2 January 2012
January 5	We Are Family	Моя безумная семья	Renat Davletyarov	Ivan Stebunov, Aglaya Shilovskaya, Leonid Yarmolnik, Maria Shukshina, Pavel Priluchny	Comedy	
January 19,	Stone	Камень	Vyacheslav Kaminsky	Sergei Svetlakov; Olesya Sudzilovskaya; Nikolay Kozak; Yelena Koreneva	Crime thriller	
January 24	The Admirer	Поклонница	Vitaliy Melnikov	Kirill Pirogov; Svetlana Ivanova; Aleksandr Adabashyan	Drama	
January 25	Rzhevsky versus Napoleon	Ржевский против Наполеона	Maryus Vaysberg	Pavel Derevyanko, Svetlana Khodchenkova, Mikhail Galustyan	Parody	
February 2	Indifference	Безразличие	Oleg Flyangolts	Fyodor Bondarchuk, Aleksandr Bashirov, Olga Shorina	Lyric comedy	
February 14	Cinderella	Zолушка	Anton Bormatov	Kristina Asmus; Nikita Yefremov; Margarita Isaykova; Nonna Grishayeva	Comedy, Romance	
February 22	August Eighth	Август Восьмого	Dzhanik Fayziev	Svetlana Ivanova; Maksim Matveyev; Artyom Fadeev; Egor Beroev; Alexander Oleshko	War, Drama, Fantasy	
March 1	Suicides	Самоубийцы	Egor Baranov	Yevgeny Stychkin; Oksana Akinshina; Alexey Vorobyov	Comedy	
March 1	Moms	Мамы	Evgeniy Abyzov		Comedy	
March 15	Bedouin	Бедуин	Igor Voloshin	Olga Simonova; Sergey Svetlakov; Mikhail Evlanov; Dinara Drukarova	Action, Biograph, Drama	
March 15	Here is Carlson	Тот ещё Карлосон	Sarik Andreasyan	Mikhail Galustyan; Fedya Smirnov; Mariya Syomkina; Igor Vernik	Comedy, Family, Fantasy	
March 29	Atomic Ivan	Атомный Иван	Vasily Barkhatov	Yuliya Snigir; Grigoriy Dobrygin; Yekaterina Vasilyeva; Evgeniya Dmitrieva	Comedy, Romance	
March 29	The Conductor	Дирижёр	Pavel Lungin	Vladas Bagdonas; Inga Oboldina; Karen Badalov; Sergey Koltakov	Drama	

Date	Title	Russian Title	Director	Cast	Genre(s)	Notes
April 5	The Spy	Шпион	Alexey Andrianov	Danila Kozlovsky; Fyodor Bondarchuk; Anna Chipovskaya; Viktoriya Tolstoganova; Sergey Gazarov	Dieselpunk	
April 5	The Sky Under the Heart	Небо под сердцем	Victoria Kaskova		Drama	
May 1	The Game	Матч	Andrey Malyukov	Sergey Bezrukov; Elizaveta Boyarskaya; Ekaterina Klimova; Karen Badalov	Drama, History, Sport, War	
May 3	White Tiger	Белый тигр	Karen Shakhnazarov	Aleksey Vertkov; Vitali Kishchenko; Aleksandr Vakhov; Vitaliy Dordzhiev; Dmitriy Bykovskiy-Romashov	Action, Adventure, War	The film was selected as the Russian entry for the Best Foreign Language Oscar at the 85th Academy Awards, but it did not make the final shortlist.
June 14	Kokoko	Кококо	Dunya Smirnova	Anna Mikhalkova	Drama	
June 28	Love with an Accent	Любовь с акцентом	Rezo Gigineishvili	Anna Mikhalkova; Nadezhda Mikhalkova	Comedy	

Date	Title	Russian Title	Director	Cast	Genre(s)	Notes
August 30	Living	Жить	Vassily Sigarev	Olga Lapshina; Marina Gavrilova; Sasha Gavrilova; Yana Troyanova	Drama	
September 7	Branded	Москва 2017	Jamie Bradshaw; Aleksandr Dulerayn	Ed Stoppard; Leelee Sobieski; Max von Sydow; Jeffrey Tambor; Ingeborga Dapkunaite	Dark fantasy	
September 20	The Horde	Орда	Andrei Proshkin	Maksim Sukhanov; Roza Khayrullina; Aleksandr Yatsenko; Vitaliy Khaev	Historical, Drama	

Date	Title	Russian Title	Director	Cast	Genre(s)	Notes
October 4	Soulless	Духless	Roman Prygunov	Danila Kozlovsky; Mariya Andreyeva; Artyom Mikhalkov; Nikita Panfilov; Artur Smolyaninov	Black comedy-drama	
November 1	Betrayal	Измена	Kirill Serebrennikov	Albina Dzhanabaeva; Dejan Lilic; Franziska Petri; Artūrs Skrastiņš	Drama	
November 1	The Ballad of Uhlans	1812: Уланская баллада	Oleg Flyanholz	Sergei Bezrukov; Anna Chipovskaya; Anton Sokolov; Dimitri Isayev	Adventure, Historical	
November 1	Steel Butterfly	Стальная бабочка	Renat Davletyarov	Darya Melnikova; Anatoliy Beliy; Darya Moroz; Andrey Kazakov; Semyon Treskunov	Crime, Drama, Mystery	
November 9	Waiting for the Sea	В ожидании моря	Bakhtyar Khudojnazarov	Egor Beroev; Anastasiya Mikulchina; Detlev Buck; Dinmukhamet Akhimov	Drama	
November 11	Celestial Wives of the Meadow Mari	Небесные жёны луговых мари	Aleksei Fedorchenko	Yuliya Aug	Drama	
November 15	Short Stories	Рассказы	Mikhail Segal	Andrey Merzlikin; Darya Nosik; Andrey Petrov; Igor Ugolnikov	Comedy, Drama, Mystery	
November 22	In the Fog	В тумане	Sergei Loznitsa	Vladimir Svirskiy; Vladislav Abashin; Sergei Kolesov; Yulia Peresild	Drama, Historical, War	
November 29	Legatee	Бригада: Наследник	Denis Alekseev	Ivan Makarevich; Yekaterina Guseva; Aleksandr Inshakov; Kirill Nagiev	Action	
November 29	Jungle	Джунгли	Alexandre Voytinsky	Sergey Svetlakov, Vera Brezhnava	romance drama	
December 6	And Here's What's Happening to Me	Со мною вот что происходит	Viktor Shamirov	Yuriy Kutsenko	Comedy, Drama	
December 27	Three Heroes on Distant Shores	Три богатыря на дальних берегах	Konstantin Feoktistov	Dmitriy Bykovskiy-Romashov; Valeriy Solovyov; Sergey Makovetskiy; Oleg Kulikovich	Animation	Melnitsa Animation Studio
February 13, 2014	Gold	Золото	Andrey Marmontov	Sergey Bezrukov; Irina Skobtseva; Andrey Merzlikin; Mikhail Porechenkov	Comedy, Drama	

== See also ==
- 2012 in film
- 2012 in Russia
