= Doctor Liza (disambiguation) =

Doctor Liza may refer to:

- Elizaveta Glinka ( 1962 – 2016), Russian humanitarian worker and charity activist
- Doctor Liza, 2009 documentary by Elena Pogrebizhskaya
- Doctor Liza (film), 2020 drama film
