= Pavel Dodonov =

Russian composer

Pavel Viktorovich Dodonov (Russian: Павел Викторович Додонов; born November 17, 1979, Ulyanovsk) is a Russian guitarist, electronic musician and composer. He is best known as the guitarist and co-author of Dolphin, with whom he recorded four albums. Member of the DDT and Race to Space collectives.

The author of the soundtracks for Vasily Sigarev's film Living (2012; nomination for Kinotavr) and Roman Prygunov's TV series Dead Lake (2019).

Now based in Moscow, Russia.

== Filmography ==
- Living (2012)
- Dead Lake (2019)
- We Need to Make Films about Love (2024)
