= Corrections Class =

- Theatrical release poster
- Directed by: Ivan Tverdovskiy
- Written by: Mariya Borodyanskaya; Dmitry Lanchikhin; Ivan Tverdovskiy
- Produced by: Natalya Mokritskaya; Ulyana Saveleva; Mila Rozanova; Michael Kaczmarek
- Starring: Maria Poezzhaeva; Filipp Avdeyev; Nikita Kukushkin; Natalya Pavlenkova; Olga Lapshina; Natalya Domeretskaya
- Cinematography: Fedor Struchev
- Release date: 9 July 2014
- Running time: 98 min
- Country: Russia
- Language: Russian

Corrections Class (Russian: Класс коррекции, romanized: Klass korrektsii) is a 2014 Russian drama film directed by Ivan Tverdovskiy. It premiered on 4 June 2014 at Kinotavr where it won the prize for Best Debut and the Prize of Film Distributors Jury. The film also received the East of the West Award at the Karlovy Vary International Film Festival.

== Plot ==
Lena is a bright, disabled girl with myopathy who must use a wheelchair to get around. After years being homeschooled by her protective mother, she is keen to get back to school. She is assigned to a special class for physically and psychologically disabled students who have to present themselves before a school commission at the end of the year in order to prove that they merit being moved back into a "normal" class. There she meets a group of students; Mishka, brother and sister Mitka and Vitka, Olya, and Anton. Though initially appearing to be her friends, they quickly display high degrees of callousness when they treat it as a joke when one of their classmates is killed trying to lie beneath a moving train, an activity the group indulges in out of boredom. Their teachers, meanwhile, treat the corrections class with contempt and show absolutely no desire to motivate the students or help them improve.

Anton, however, treats Lena with kindness, and the two soon begin a relationship. Lena admonishes the group for their behavior and urges them to concentrate on passing the commission so they can get back to normal school. Lena and Anton's relationship, however, upsets the rest of the group, particularly Mishka, who concocts a plan with the rest of the group to have sex with Lena. After stealing her wheelchair, they separate her from Anton, and Mishka and Mitka attempt to rape Lena while Vitka and Olya shoot video on their phones. However, they find they cannot complete the act, and leave her beaten and bruised on the side of the train tracks.

The final day of school arrives and the students get their results - every one of them has passed, except for Lena, who the commission votes to keep on in the corrections class another year. When Lena asks the group why they did what they did, they cruelly insult her. Anton, who does not know about the rape, also begins ignoring her. The final scene is of Lena's mother collapsing in the school hallway in tears, when Lena appears behind her - walking unassisted without her wheelchair.

== Analysis ==
The title "Corrections Class" implies that these individuals with disabilities require a sort of correcting in order to become "normal". However, when these individuals seem to act "normal" and partake in typical teenager activities, they are punished. This film shows the harsh reality of the struggles of individuals with disabilities in schools and throughout their lives. "Corrections Class is also a film about the helplessness of children and parents facing the power of a school headmaster who has absolute control over the pupils’ lives assigning them either to correction or normal school life. In the figure of the headmaster the film shows us the ugly abuse of power which is given to individuals by the very institutions they form and represent. Tverdovskii provides us with a powerful image combining all these topics – that of newly installed tracks for Lena’s wheelchair which prove useless."

== Cast ==
- Maria Poezzhaeva as Lena Chekhova
- Filipp Avdeyev as Anton Sobolev
- Nikita Kukushkin as Mishka
- Yuliya Serina as Vitka
- Artyom Markaryan as Mitka
- Mariya Uryadova as Olya
- Natalya Pavlenkova as Svetlana Viktorovna, Lena's mother
- Olga Lapshina as Polina Grigorevna, Anton's mother
- Natalya Domeretskaya as Tereza Pavlovna Kuznetsova, school director
- Marina Nikolayeva as Elena Viktorovna, head teacher
- Irina Vilkova as Lyudmila Nikolaevna, class teacher
- Elena Nesterova as math teacher
- Zhanetta Demikhova as Olga Nikolaevna, Cleaning woman
- Olga Roslova as biology teacher

== Reception ==
The film had a positive reception and received praise from GQ, The Hollywood Reporter, Gazeta.ru.
