= Sitora Alieva =

Tajik writer

Sitora Alieva Ситора Шохиновна Алиева
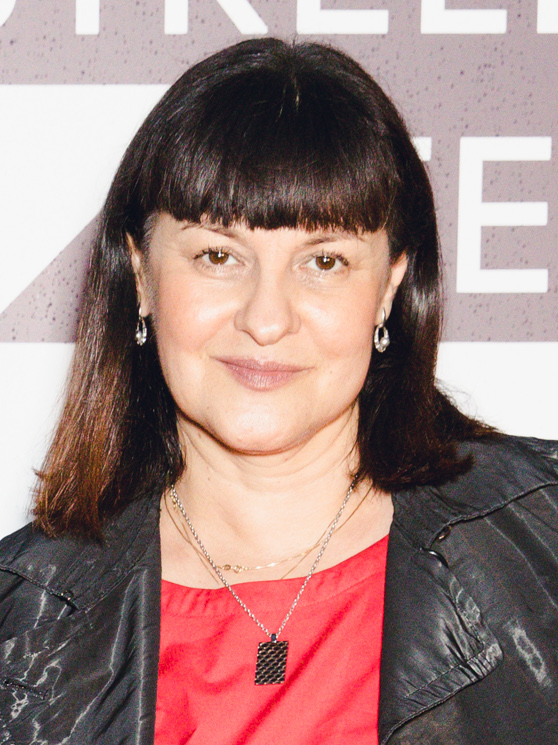
- Sitora Alieva (2018)
- Born: 4 October 1963 (age 63); Dushanbe, Tajik SSR
- Occupations: film expert, artistic director of the Kinotavr film festival

Sitora Shokhinovna Alieva (Russian: Ситора Шохиновна Алиева) – film expert, director of the IFF “Faces of love” and the IIF Sochi, artistic director of the largest Russian national film festival “Kinotavr”, official delegate of Warsaw International Film Festival, lecturer at film schools and universities, juror at numerous film festivals, including Berlinale, Venice Film Festival, etc. Member of European Film Academy.

== Biography ==
Sitora Alieva was born in 1963 in Dushanbe, Tajik SSR. She made her film debut as an actress at the age of 7. In the following 9 years she had played about ten roles in different art and television films. In 1987 Alieva graduated from the scriptwriting and film history department (Evgeniy Surkov's class) of the Gerasimov Institute of Cinematography (VGIK) in Moscow. Then she worked for Tajikfilm in Dushanbe and in 1991 promoted Tajik films at different venues around the world including Moscow International Film Festival.

In 1991 she moved to Moscow and then began to work as Daniil Dondurey's, "Iskusstvo Kino" editor-in-chief, referent (1993-1996). In 1993 she began to work at “Kinotavr” conglomerate ran by Mark Rudinstein, and in 1999 became the director of its festival branches: IFF Sochi, IFF “Faces of Love” and the International Children's Arts Festival “Kinotavrik” (1999-2005).

In 2005, after the “Kinotavr” brand was bought by Alexander Rodnyansky, only Russian part of the festival was left, IIF Sochi and IFF “Faces of Love” were stopped. Alieva has become the permanent artistic director of the Open Russian Film Festival “Kinotavr” – the largest national film festival of the country for now (the edition of Kinotavr-2022 is cancelled).

Also, as a film expert and a festival professional, she lectures in Russia and abroad.

Since 90-s Alieva has been taking part in juries of numerous international, national, the CIS and the Baltics, student and short film festivals, including:

- 2002 - Hyderabad International Film Festival
- 2005 - Tallinn Black Nights Film Festival
- 2006 - Mar del Plata International Film Festival
- 2006 - European Film Festival Palic
- 2006 - Cottbus Festival of Eastern European Cinema
- 2007 - 57th Berlin International Film Festival
- 2007 - 22nd Mar del Plata International Film Festival
- 2007 - Zurich Film Festival
- 2007 - Artfilm
- 2008 - 13th International Film Festival of Kerala
- 2009 - 66th Venice International Film Festival
- 2009 - Reykjavík International Film Festival
- 2010 - F5 Short Film Festival
- 2011 - Filmfest München
- 2011 - 46th Karlovy Vary International Film Festival
- 2011 - 27th Warsaw Film Festival
- 2011 - 52nd Thessaloniki International Film Festival
- 2012 - Let's CEE Film Festival
- 2012 - 9th Golden Apricot International Film Festival
- 2012 - Batumi International Art-House Film Festival
- 2013 - Minsk International Film Festival “Listapad”
- 2013 - 2morrow/Завтра Film Festival
- 2013 - Scanorama European Film Forum
- 2014 - VIII Andrey Tarkovsky International Film Festival Zerkalo (Zerkalo Film Festival)
- 2015 - Sofia International Film Festival
- 2016 - "Slovo" Award
- 2017 - Reykjavík International Film Festival
- 2018 - El Gouna Film Festival
- 2018 - 2nd Pingyao Crouching Tiger Hidden Dragon International Film Festival.
- 2020 - Golden Raven Arctic International Film Festival
- 2020 - Pacific Meridian International Film Festival of Asian Pacific Countries
- 2021 - Warsaw International Film Festival

In 2007-2010 Sitora Alieva had been Russia's official delegate of the Rome International Film Festival.

Strating from 2007 - official delegate of the Warsaw International Film Festival.

People consider her to have an active international festival life, being part of an international festival network and the national film festival selector at the same time. These are the main reasons that most people think make Sitora one of the key figures in promoting new Russian cinema at the international film festival scene.
