= I Am Dragon =

I Am Dragon may refer to

- He's a Dragon (Russian: Он – дракон, romanized: On – drakón), a 2015 Russian fantasy movie also released in English as I Am Dragon
- I Am Dragon, a 2015 EP by Swedish singer-songwriter Miriam Bryant
