= The Land of Oz (film) =

- Directed by: Vassily Sigarev
- Written by: Andrey Ilenkov; Vasiliy Sigarev
- Produced by: Sofiko Kiknavelidze; Dmitriy Ulyukaev
- Starring: Yana Troyanova; Gosha Kutsenko; Andrey Ilenkov; Yevgeny Tsyganov; Vladimir Simonov
- Release date: 3 December 2015
- Running time: 100 minutes
- Country: Russia
- Language: Russian
- Budget: 1.5 million

The Land of Oz (Russian: Страна ОЗ, romanized: Strana Oz) is a 2015 Russian comedy film directed by Vassily Sigarev. The film premiered on 10 June 2015 as part of the competition program of the 26-th Open Russian Film Festival "Kinotavr", where the film received the Prize. G. Gorin "For the best script", as well as the Prize of the Guild of Film Critics and Film Critics "Elephant". On a wide screen in Russia came December 3, 2015.

The name refers to a fictional place, Land of Oz.

== Plot ==
Lena Shabadinova, along with her older sister Irka, visits a friend of Irka’s, who recently gave her a cold reception. While in the building’s entrance, the sisters discuss a plan for revenge, but things take an unexpected turn when Irka is pushed off a balcony once again. As a result, she fractures her tailbone and is rushed to the hospital. After Irka is taken to the hospital, Lena calls her aunt Lyuba to inform her of the incident and asks for directions to Torforyezov Street in Yekaterinburg. Lena needs the street’s location to find a local food stall where she has recently gotten a job. Unable to reach her aunt, Lena decides to hitchhike to Yekaterinburg to find the street on her own.

== Cast ==
- Yana Troyanova as Lenka Shabadinova
- Gosha Kutsenko as Roman
- Andrey Ilenkov as Andrey
- Aleksandr Bashirov as Duke
- Yevgeny Tsyganov as driver
- Vladimir Simonov as Bard Aleksey Poberdin
- Svetlana Kamynina as Bard's wife
- Inna Churikova as mother
- Oleg Topolyanskiy as sofa warrior #1
- Ilya Talochkin as sofa warrior #2
- Yevgeny Smirnov as sofa warrior # 3
- Yuliya Snigir as Fifa
- Aleksandr Mosin as Fifa's husband
- Alisa Khazanova as Maiden #1
- Darya Ekamasova as Maiden #2
- Dmitry Kulichkov as police chief
- Irina Belova as Irka
- Zinaida Bondarevskaya as Lyubka
- Pavel Vyukhin as boy at the kiosk
- Svetlana Evdokimova as cameo
- Aleksey Evdokimov as cameo
- Darya Skopinova as seller of fireworks
- Kseniya Gladkikh as Maruska
- Leonid Rybnikov as father
- Aleksandr Volkhonskiy as Mikhail Pavlovich
- Ella Priymenko as Olga Mikhailovna
- Maksim Udintsev as schoolboy
- Nadezhda Chaykina as Drishka
- Konstantin Shavkunov as Bibikov
- Irina Shavkunova as Bibikova
- Andrei Monakhov as witness from Fryazin
- Vitaly Zobnin as boy with a phone
- Timur Gaidarov as policeman # 1
- Vasiliy Belyaev as policeman # 2

== Awards ==
- 2015 Kinotavr: Best Screenplay and Prize of the Guild of Russian Film Scholars and Film Critics
- 2016 Festival de l'Europe autour de l'Europe: Prix Luna
