= 3rd Asia Pacific Screen Awards =

Nearly empty article

The 3rd Asia Pacific Screen Awards were held in 2009.

== Winners and nominees ==
Winners are listed first and in bold.

=== Best Feature Film ===
- **Samson & Delilah**
- The Time that Remains
- About Elly
- City of Life and Death
- Forever Enthralled

=== Best Youth Feature Film ===
- **A Brand New Life**
- Tahaan: A Boy with a Grenade
- The Strength of Water
- Pesantren: 3 Wishes 3 Loves
- Mommo the Bogeyman

=== Best Animated Feature Film ===
- **Mary and Max**
- The Tale of Soldier Fedot, The Daring Fellow
- Summer Wars
- The Sky Crawlers
- First Squad: The Moment of Truth

=== Best Documentary Feature Film ===
- **Defamation**
- Survive, in the heart of the Khmer Rouge madness
- Mental
- Gandhi's Children
- Citizen Juling

=== Achievement in Cinematography ===
- **Cao Yu** (**City of Life and Death**)
- Alexei Arsentiev (Wolfy)
- Alisher Khamidhodjaev and Maxim Drozdov (Paper Soldier)
- Ali Mohammad Ghasemi (A Light in the Fog)
- Uruphong Raksasad (Agrarian Utopia)

=== Achievement in Directing ===
- **Lu Chuan** (**City of Life and Death**)
- Sion Sono (Love Exposure)
- Anurag Kashyap (Dev.D)
- Vimukthi Jayasundara (Between Two Worlds)
- Asghar Farhadi (About Elly)

=== Best Screenplay ===
- **Asghar Farhadi** (**About Elly**)
- Yogesh Vinayak Joshi and Upendra Sidhaye (Mumbai My Life)
- Bong Joon-ho and Park Eun-kyo (Mother)
- Baek Seung-Bin (Members of the Funeral)
- Kundo Koyama (Departures)

=== Best Performance by an Actress ===
- **Kim Hye-ja** (**Mother**)
- Zhou Xun (The Equation of Love and Death)
- Yana Troyanova (Wolfy)
- Malani Fonseka (Flowers of the Sky)
- Golshifteh Farahani (About Elly)

=== Best Performance by an Actor ===
- **Masahiro Motoki** (**Departures**)
- Ge You (If You Are the One)
- Naseeruddin Shah (A Wednesday!)
- Mohammad Bakri (Laila's Birthday)
- Yang Ik-june (Breathless)

=== FIAPF Award ===
- **Isao Matsuoka**

=== UNESCO Award ===
- **Uruphong Raksasad** (**Agrarian Utopia**)

=== Jury Grand Prize ===
- **The Time That Remains**
- **About Elly**
