= Yana Troyanova =

Russian actress and director

- Born: Yana Aleksandrovna Mokritskaya; 12 February 1973 (age 53) p. Lechebnyy, Sysertsky District, Sverdlovsk Oblast, Soviet Union
- Occupation: Actress
- Years active: 2003–present
- Spouse: Vasily Sigarev

Yana Aleksandrovna Troyanova (Russian: Яна Александровна Троянова; born 12 February 1973) is a Russian theater and film actress, director. Her notable works include Living, Wolfy and Kokoko. She directed the short film Ryadom.

== Biography ==
Yana Mokritskaya was born in posyolok Lechebnyy Sverdlovsk Oblast. Before studying at the Ekaterinburg Theater Institute in the Anisimov studio, she studied at the Faculty of Philosophy of the Ural State University. In her second year at the theater institute, she went to work at the Small Drama Theater "Teatron". In 2005-2006 Troyanova worked at the Kolyada Theater.

In 2009 at Kinotavr she won the Best Actress for the movie Wolfy by Sigarev. She was also nominated at White Elephant and Asia Pacific Screen Awards for this role.

In 2012 at Kinotavr she won Best Actress for the movie Kokoko by Dunya Smirnova.

Troyanova made her directorial debut in 2014 at Kinotavr in Short Movie category with her movie Ryadom.

== Personal life ==
Troyanova was married twice. Her son from the first marriage died in 2011.

From 2003 to 2020, she was married to the playwright and film director Vasily Sigarev.

== Filmography ==
Year	Title	Original title	Role	Notes
2007	Sakhar (based on the poem by Paul Eluard)	Russian: "Сахар"	main role	short film
2009	Wolfy	Russian: "Волчок"	Mother	
2012	Living	Russian: "Жить"	Grishka	
2012	A hundred ways to win at Kinotavr	Russian: "Сто способов победить на Кинотавре"	Yana Troyanova	short film
2012	Kokoko	Russian: "Кококо"	Vika	
2012	Celestial Wives of the Meadow Mari	Russian: "Небесные жёны луговых мари"	Orika	
2015	The Land of Oz	Russian: "Страна ОЗ"	Lenka	
2015	Rooster	Russian: "Петух"	the Registrar	short film
2016	Korotche	Russian: "Короче"	main role	
2016	Olga	Russian: "Ольга"	Olga	television series
2017	Z	"Z"	Lera	short film

== See also ==
- Asia Pacific Screen Award for Best Performance by an Actress
- Prize-winners of "Kinotavr" (in Russian)
