= Face of Love =

Face of Love, Faces of Love or The Face of Love may refer to:

== Film and television ==
- The Faces of Love (film), a 1924 Italian silent film
- The Face of Love, a 1954 BBC TV movie adapted from Troilus and Cressida
- Faces of Love (1977 film), a French drama film
- Faces of Love (2007 film), a Filipino film
- The Face of Love (2013 film), a 2013 American film
- The Face of Love (1954 film), a 1954 BBC TV film
- Faces of Love Film Festival, Russian film festival

== Literature ==
- Faces of Love: Hafez and the Poets of Shiraz, 2012 collection of poetry by Hafez

== Music ==
- The Face of Love (album), a 2006 album by Sanctus Real, or its title track
- Faces of Love (EP), a 2018 extended play by Bae Suzy
- The Faces of Love: The Songs of Jake Heggie, a 1999 album by Jake Heggie
- "Face of Love", a song by Miranda Cosgrove from the 2011 extended play High Maintenance
- "Face of Love", a song by Jewel from the 1999 release Joy: A Holiday Collection
- "Ishq Da Chehra" ('Face of Love'), a song by Sachet–Parampara and Diljit Dosanjh from the 2026 Indian film Border 2
