= First on the Moon =

2005 film by Aleksei Fedorchenko

- Directed by: Aleksei Fedorchenko
- Written by: Aleksandr Gonorovsky; Ramil Yamaleyev
- Produced by: Dmitri Vorobyov
- Starring: Aleksei Anisimov; Viktoriya Ilyinskaya; Viktor Kotov; Andrei Osipov; Anatoli Otradnov; Igor Sannikov; Aleksei Slavnin; Boris Vlasov
- Cinematography: Anatoliy Lesnikov
- Edited by: Lyudmila Zalozhneva
- Music by: Sergei Sidelnikov
- Release dates: 1 September 2005 (Venice Film Festival); 29 September 2005 (Russia)
- Running time: 75 min.
- Country: Russia
- Language: Russian/Spanish

First on the Moon (Russian: Первые на Луне, romanized: Pervye na Lune) is a 2005 Russian mockumentary science fiction film about a fictional 1930s Soviet landing on the Moon. The film, which went on to win many awards, was the debut of the director Aleksei Fedorchenko.

== Plot ==
Around 2000, a group of journalists is investigating a highly secret document when they uncover a sensational story: that before the Second World War, in 1938, the first rocket was made in the USSR and Soviet scientists were planning to send an orbiter to the Moon and back. The evidence is convincing; it is clear that in this case, Soviet crewed lunar program cosmonauts were first.

The movie follows the selection and training of a small group of cosmonauts. The one who shines above the others (similar to the clear front-runners in the early historical Soviet space program) is Captain Ivan Sergeyevich Kharlamov (possibly a reference to the real-life cosmonaut Valentin Varlamov). He is helped into a space suit and loaded into the capsule, and the rocket lifts off for the Moon—but contact with it is soon lost.

Most of the remainder of the film seems to follow the search for information about what happened next, as the 1930s space program appears to have dissolved immediately after, with no reason given (but presumably as a part of Stalin's purges). It is implied that Kharlamov returned to Earth, but with no fanfare and apparently no assistance from the space program. A number of men are shown as suspected of being Kharlamov—the NKVD seems to be conducting a criminal investigation of the program and it is implied that those involved, including Kharlamov himself, are in hiding.

It seems that the capsule returned to Earth and landed in Chile, and that Kharlamov journeyed to the Russian Far East by way of Polynesia and China, yet feared capture on his return. His wife apparently covered for him when interrogated as to his whereabouts. Kharlamov is later found on the Mongolian steppes following the Battles of Khalkhin Gol, having suffered a severe traumatic brain injury. After undergoing psychiatric treatment in a sanitorium in Chita, he disappears. His wife later remarries.

The very end of the movie shows the only footage of the mission itself after launch, explaining it as a film which was found at the landing site in Chile and is currently in the possession of the Antofagasta Natural museum. First there is a brief clip showing Kharlamov piloting the vehicle, presumably on final approach to the Moon. Following that is an equally brief panorama of a lunar landscape with the capsule or lander (it's unclear whether this was a direct ascent Moon landing) resting on the surface, apparently taken by Kharlamov during lunar EVA. Both scenes are shown as stills on the movie's cover. Then there is a short clip of the other cosmonauts walking through a hangar with the 1930s space program director, and the credits roll.

== Production ==
The screenplay was written by Aleksandr Gonorovsky and Ramil Yamaleyev.

Production of First on the Moon lasted for three years and involved more than a thousand people. Most of filming was performed on Sverdlovsk Film Studio. The cosmonaut space training was filmed in Chelyabinsk, at the Institute of Aviation, where there exists equipment from Star City which even Gagarin used for training. The actors worked without stunt doubles; they were really spinning in the centrifuge, despite the fact that this training is difficult even for professionals.

The film was made in both black and white and color, with cinematography by Anatoliy Lesnikov. Vera Zelinskaya was the production designer.

== Cast ==
- Boris Vlasov as Cap. Ivan Kharlamov, the cosmonaut.
- Andrei Osipov as Fyodor Suprun, the Chief Constructor.
- Viktoriya Ilyinskaya as Nadezhda Svetlaya, a cosmonaut candidate.
- Viktor Kotov as Mikhail Roshchin, a cosmonaut candidate with dwarfism.
- Aleksei Slavnin as Khanif Fattakhov, a cosmonaut candidate.
- Anatoli Otradnov as Khanif Fattakhov in old age.

== Reception ==
=== Critical response ===
When elements of the plot started leaking out, a number of Russian newspapers treated it as a documentary about a real 1938 event, referring to it as the Santiago Meteorite (метеорит "Сантьяго"). In reality, the film is fiction. To quote the director: "Some type of new genre. It was very difficult to decide on a name. So far, for me this is either historical drama or documentary fantasy." He also said: "Our film is about how the Soviet state machinery manufactured major products - the best people. Fine, strong and clever heroes, then rendered [them] unnecessary to the native land – some have been destroyed, others lost in obscurity, yet others still broken by fear."

Julia Vassilieva credits cinematographer Anatoliy Lesnikov and set designer Nikolai Pavlov with a form "... mimicking so successfully the documentary mode" as the reason that First on the Moon won 2005 Venice Film Festival award for a documentary.

=== Awards and nominations ===
- 2005 — Cottbus Film Festival of Young East European Cinema: First Work Award of the Student Jury and Special Prize
- 2005 — Flanders International Film Festival: Grand Prix
- 2005 — Venice Film Festival: Venice Horizons Best Film Award
- 2005 — Warsaw International Film Festival: Special Mention
- 2005 — Zagreb Film Festival: Golden Pram Award
- 2005 — The Best Debut Prize, Kinotaur festival, Sochi, Russia
- 2006 — Eurocon: Best performance

== See also ==
- Apollo 18 (film)
