= Oksana Karas =

Russian film director

- Born: Oksana Mikhailovna Karas; June 19, 1979 (age 46); Kharkiv, Ukrainian SSR, Soviet Union
- Occupations: Film director, screenwriter, editor
- Years active: 1998–present
- Spouse: Sergey Machilsky

Oksana Mikhailovna Karas (Russian: Оксана Михайловна Карас; born June 19, 1979) is a Russian film director and screenwriter. Winner of Grand Prix of the Kinotavr.

== Biography ==
=== Early years and education ===
Oksana was born on June 19, 1979, in Kharkiv. In an interview she gave to Ekaterina Gordeeva she said that all her relatives were from Ukraine, born in Poltava region. She spent her childhood years in Aktau, Kazakhstan, where her father was sent for practice after graduation from Kharkiv Aviation Institute. Eventually, her parents divorced and she moved to Moscow with her mother. In 2004, Karas graduated from the Faculty of Law of the Peoples' Friendship University of Russia. Then she entered the Gerasimov Institute of Cinematography and took Valery Lonskoy's course. She graduated as a director in 2009.

=== Career ===
Karas worked as a TV presenter, correspondent, sports commentator, film reviewer, and author of documentaries.

As a NTV journalist, in 2000 she covered 2000 Summer Olympics. In 2004-2005 she hosted ‘Sportissimo’ show on NTV+. In 2007-2008 she hosted the show ‘Expert Board’ on Kultura TV Channel.

In 2008 she directed the TV series ‘The Detective Brothers’. In the same year she wrote a script and directed short film ‘Casting’ that was awarded with Grand Prix at the Unprecedented Cinema International Film Festival in Estonia.

In 2013 she made her debut with a full-length film and directed the ‘Rehearsals’ movie based on her own scenario. In the same year she wrote scripts for ‘Gone Missing’ and ‘Muay Thai Princess’. In 2015 she wrote the script for the comedy film ‘Non Wedding Trip’.

In 2016 she released her next movie, The Good Boy. It was awarded the Grand Prix of the XXVII Kinotavr and got the third prize of the Window to Europe Festival. Her next projects were a short movie ‘Like Adults’ and Straight A.

In 2018, Karas released two movies — ‘Angel’s Angina’ based on Vadim Shefner's novel and Higher Than Sky.

In October 2020, she released the biopic Doctor Lisa about Elizaveta Glinka, a prominent Russian humanitarian worker and charity activist.

In 2021, Karas made the Bureaucrat TV series. The story is about a high-ranking official of the Ministry of Public Health who discovers the consequences of corruption in drug procurement.

== Family ==
Oksana is married to Sergei Machilsky, they have three children: Eseniya, Alexander and Peter.

== Filmography (selected) ==
- The Good Boy (2016)
- Above the Sky (2018)
- Doctor Lisa (2020)
