= Good Boy (2016 film) =

- Directed by: Oksana Karas
- Screenplay by: Mikhail Mestetsky; Roman Kantor
- Produced by: Vasiliy Solovyov; Fyodor Bondarchuk; Anna Peskova; Dmitri Rudovskiy; Yuri Khrapov
- Starring: Semyon Treskunov; Mikhail Yefremov; Konstantin Khabensky; Anastasia Bogatyryov; Ieva Andrejevaitė
- Cinematography: Suzanna Musaeva
- Music by: Mikhail Morskov; Artyom Fedotov band NEOPOLEON
- Production companies: 2D Celluloid, Art Pictures Studios; Walt Disney Studios Motion Pictures
- Distributed by: WDSSPR
- Release date: 10 November 2016
- Running time: 95 minutes
- Country: Russia

Good Boy (Russian: Хороший мальчик, romanized: Khoroshiy malchik) is a 2016 Russian comedy film directed by Oksana Karas. The film depicts six days from the life of a ninth-grader. The picture won the Grand Prix of the 27th Kinotavr. It was released on 10 November 2016.

== Plot ==
The film depicts six days from the life of ninth-grader Kolya Smirnov (Semyon Treskunov).

Kolya falls in love with his teacher (Ieva Andreevajte). Someone sets fire to the school's additional building which contained the new computers.

The principal's daughter, high school student Ksyusha (Anastasia Bogatyryova), in turn falls in love with Kolya and is under the impression that Kolya was the one who set the school on fire.

Kolya's father Alexander (Konstantin Khabensky) makes the family transition to the 12/36 system – this means twelve hours for sleep and thirty-six hours for staying awake, which does not allow the protagonist to sleep or even to collect thoughts.

== Cast ==
- Semyon Treskunov – Kolya Smirnov
- Mikhail Yefremov – Vladimir Dronov
- Konstantin Khabensky – Alexander Smirnov
- Anastasia Bogatyryova – Ksysha Dronova
- Ieva Andreevajte – Alisa Denisovna
- Aleksandr Pal — Stanislav Ilyich

== Production ==
Semyon Treskunov auditioned for the film Good Boy for the first time when he was 11, and this was the third casting in his life. At that time he was too young for this role. Because of problems with financing, the launching of the preparatory period was repeatedly postponed and by the time investors appeared Treskunov had grown to the age required by the scenario.
