= Living (2012 film) =

- Film poster
- Russian: Жить
- Directed by: Vasily Sigarev
- Written by: Vasily Sigarev
- Produced by: Roman Borisevich; Aleksandr Kushaev
- Starring: Olga Lapshina; Marina Gavrilova; Sasha Gavrilova; Yana Troyanova; Aleksey Filimonov
- Cinematography: Alisher Khamidkhodzhaev
- Edited by: Dasha Danilova
- Music by: Pavel Dodonov
- Production company: Koktebel Film Studio
- Release date: January 2012 (Rotterdam)
- Running time: 119 min.
- Country: Russia
- Language: Russian

Living (Russian: Жить, romanized: Zhit) is a 2012 Russian drama film directed by Vasily Sigarev.

The film premiered at the 2012 International Film Festival Rotterdam.

== Plot ==
The film tells about people who can't put up with the loss of loved ones and declare war on fate.

== Cast ==
- Olga Lapshina as Kapustina
- Marina Gavrilova as Kapustina's daughter
- Sasha Gavrilova as Kapustina's daughter
- Yana Troyanova as Grishka
- Aleksey Filimonov as Anton
- Aleksei Pustovoitev as Artyom
- Yevgeniy Syty as Artyom's father
- Anna Ukolova as Artyom's mother
- Dmitriy Kulichkov as Igor
- Alyona Lapteva as policewoman
- Irma Arendt as fat woman

== Awards ==
- 2012 Kinotavr: Best Director
- 2012 Thessaloniki Film Festival: Special Artistic Achievement
- 2012 Wiesbaden goEast: Golden Lily and FIPRESCI Prize
