= Elizaveta Glinka =

Russian medical doctor (1962–2016)

- Елизавета Глинка
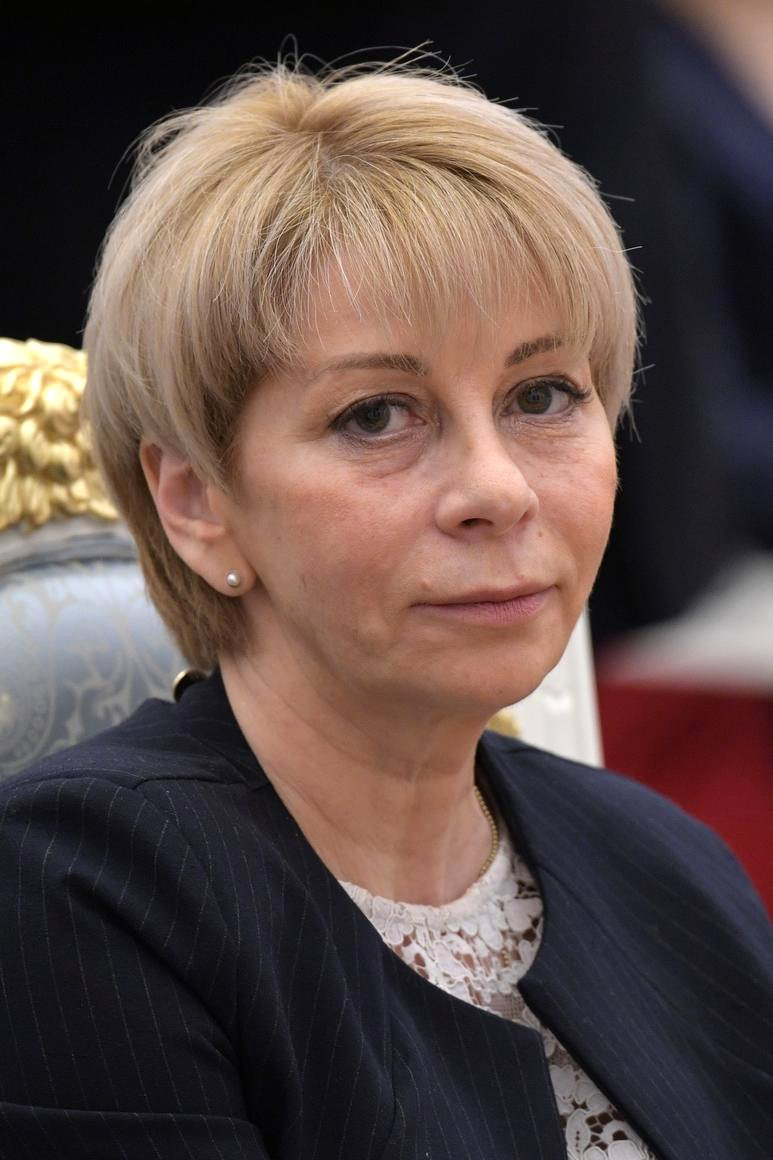
- Glinka in December 2016, 2 weeks before her death
- Born: Elizaveta Petrovna Poskryobysheva; 20 February 1962; Moscow, Russian SFSR, Soviet Union
- Died: 25 December 2016 (aged 54); Black Sea near Sochi, Russia
- Occupations: Public figure, social worker, medical doctor specialized in palliative medicine
- Spouse: Gleb Glebovich Glinka

Elizaveta Petrovna Glinka (née Poskryobysheva, (Note: Russian: Поскрёбышева) Russian: Елизавета Петровна Глинка), also known as Dr. Liza (Russian: Доктор Лиза; 20 February 1962 – 25 December 2016), was a Russian medical doctor and public figure who founded the Spravedlivaya Pomoshch (Fair Care) charity. She was accused of abducting children during the Russo-Ukrainian War. Glinka died in a crash of a Russian military plane en route to Syria.

== Early life ==
Glinka was born in Moscow. She studied at the Russian National Research Medical Institute in Moscow, graduating in pediatric anesthesiology. In 1986 she emigrated to the US, where she studied palliative care and became involved with the work of hospices. Upon return to Russia, she started working at the First Moscow Hospice, founded by Nyuta Federmesser's mother Vera Millionshikova. In the late 1990s when Glinka's husband, Gleb Glebovich Glinka, was transferred to Kyiv, Ukraine for two years, she moved to Kyiv and worked on creating palliative care in Kyiv's oncology center. In September 2001 with the help of VALE Hospice International she opened the first public hospice in Kyiv. In 2007, when her mother became gravely ill, Glinka returned to Moscow.

== Career ==
Glinka's first charity project began in 1999, when she opened the first public hospice in Kyiv, Ukraine. She later founded the VALE Hospice International fund based in USA and served as a board member of the Vera Hospice Charity Fund in Moscow.

In 2007 she founded a humanitarian NGO 'Spravedlivaya Pomoshch' (in English, Fair Care, Fair Aid or Fair Help). The organization worked to support terminally ill cancer patients and underprivileged and homeless people by providing medical supplies, financial and legal aid, and other essential services. The Fair Care Foundation led numerous public initiatives. The foundation helped the homeless and provided food and medical assistance, offered palliative care programs to gravely ill patients, collected and distributed humanitarian aid to victims of natural disasters.

In January 2012 Glinka along with fifteen other media figures and opposition activists founded the League of Voters as a reaction to the 2011 protests against the election results. Their declared aims included observance of electoral rights, organizing mass marches, training observers and publishing lists of election commissions, including black lists. Shortly after an unplanned tax inspection arrived to the offices of Fair Aid. As a result, all financial assets were frozen for a period of time. On February, 1 they were unblocked, and the Fund continued its work.

The same year Glinka became a member of the federal civil committee of the Civic Platform and supported Mikhail Prokhorov during the 2012 Russian presidential election. Since November, 2012 Glinka was a member of the Russian Presidential Council for Civil Society Institutions and Human Rights (HRC).

=== Russia's covert invasion of Ukraine ===
With the outbreak of the Russo-Ukrainian War in 2014, Glinka became involved with moving Ukrainian children from territory held by Russia-backed separatists. Children were moved across the state border without permission from authorities, leading to accusations of "abducting" children. The spokesman of the Ukrainian Ministry of Foreign Affairs said that "any transportation of children who are citizens of Ukraine across the state border must take place exclusively in strict compliance with Ukrainian legislation, in the presence of relevant permission documents, as well as documents certifying the child's identity and belonging to Ukrainian citizenship. <...> The transportation of children across the state border of Ukraine in violation of these requirements entails legal liability and will be considered as international child abduction.

Her organisation was also active in providing medical supplies, equipment and food to hospitals in Donetsk and Luhansk, however Glinka complained that the customs checks for their convoys of trucks were slow and onerous and delayed delivery of the supplies. Despite Russian military forces taking part in the war, Glinka said that she didn't see Russian troops in Donetsk and that the conflict was a civil war.

=== Awards ===
In 2012 Glinka received the Order of Friendship award, and in 2015 the Decoration "For Beneficence". In December 2016 Russian President Vladimir Putin presented her with another national award, the State Prize of the Russian Federation, for outstanding achievements in charity and human rights activities.

== Death ==
Glinka died in the 2016 Russian Defence Ministry Tupolev Tu-154 crash on 25 December 2016, while travelling to Latakia to deliver medical supplies to Tishreen University Hospital. The criminal case on the crash was closed in 2019 due to the absence of a crime.

== Personal life ==
Glinka was married to a bankruptcy attorney, Gleb Glinka.

== Legacy ==
After her death, Doctor Liza's Foundation 'Spravedlivaya Pomoshch' ("Fair Aid") kept working, in a few years it was expanded and registered as an international fund. With the time, psychological help was added along with socialization initiatives to reintroduce former homeless people to the society. . On February 20, 2018, the new charity fund 'Doctor Liza' was established by her former colleagues, Gleb Glinka was invited to head the Board. Liza's friend Lana Jurkina founded 'House of Friends' charity organization that also helps the homeless people.

=== Awards, honours, and tributes ===
- May 2, 2012: Order of Friendship
- 2014: International award "Faith and Faithfulness" awarded by the St. Andrew The Apostle Foundation, where the award committee is led by the cosmonaut, Hero of the Soviet Union Oleg Atkov. The award ceremony is held in Kremlin. This award is perceived as "a symbol of public recognition of merits before Fatherland in strengthening statehood, union with countries friendly with Russia, and the restrengthening of spirituality".
- 2014: "Своя колея" – an award for people who are true to their values awarded by the Vladimir Vysotsky Foundation, Russian Ministry of Culture and the Culture Committee of the city of Moscow;
- March 23, 2015: Decoration "For Beneficence" – decorated by Vladimir Putin. During the ceremony Glinka thanked him "on behalf of hundreds of mothers Donetsk and Donetsk region, which have been taken out of the combat zone thanks to his decree";
- 2015: Order of Saint Luke – award for care ordered by the Ukrainian Orthodox Church of Moscow Patriarchate;

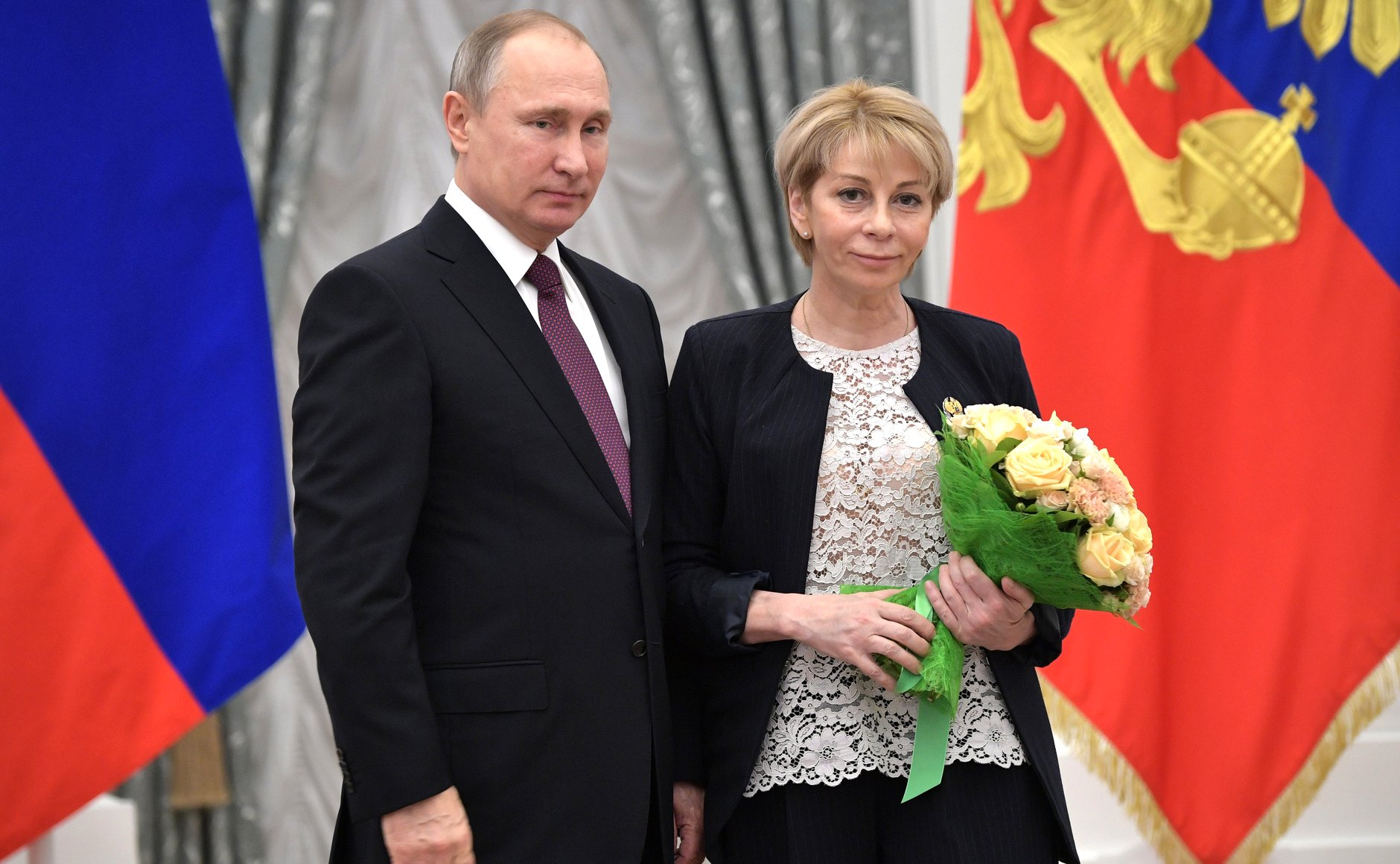
Glinka with Vladimir Putin, December 2016

- 2016: State Prize of the Russian Federation. In December 2016 Russian President Vladimir Putin presented her with another national award for outstanding achievements in charity and human rights activities.
- 2017: The rock-festival "Different People" («Разные люди») was dedicated to her memory.

After her death different Russian ministers and Chechen pro-Russian leaders announced the naming of health and care institutions after Glinka:

- Russian Defense Ministry's medical facility – announced by the Russian Deputy Minister of Defense, Ruslan Tsalikov;
- Hospice in Yekaterinburg – announced by the city's mayor, Yevgeny Roizman;
- Children's sanatorium in Yevpatoria in annexed Crimea is also to be named after Dr. Liza;
- Children's clinic in Grozny – announced on Twitter by the president of the Chechen Republic, Ramzan Kadyrov

In March 2021, a monument to Doctor Liza was opened in Russian Krasnogorsk near the children rehabilitation centre.

=== Portrayals ===
- Glinka and her work were the subject of documentary films: "Doctor Liza" (“Доктор Лиза”) by Elena Pogrebizhskaya. "Вокзал по средам" by Olga Maurynova and "Встреча" by Margarita Kuklina.
- A day of Glinka's life was portrayed in the 2020 film Doctor Liza, directed by Oksana Karas and starring Chulpan Khamatova as Glinka.
