= Maria Poezzhaeva =

Russian actress in theater and cinema (born 1989)

- Мария Поезжаева
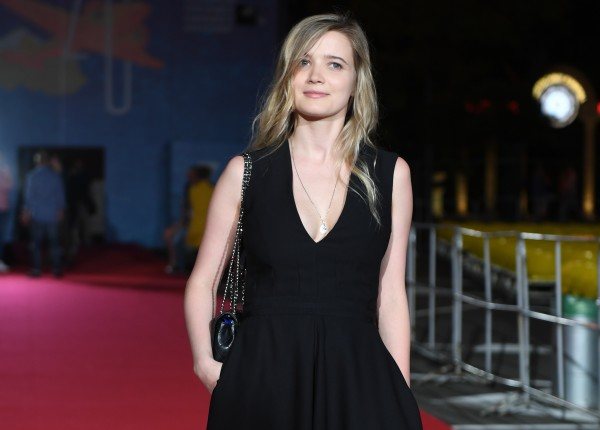
- Maria Poezzhaeva at the Kinotavr Open Russian Film Festival in Sochi.
- Born: Maria Vasilevna Poezzhaeva; 3 March 1989 (age 37); Perm, RSFSR, USSR
- Education: Gogol Center
- Occupation: Actress
- Years active: 2010–present
- Spouse: Vladislav Opelyants
- Children: 1

Maria Vasilevna Poezzhaeva (Russian: Мария Васильевна Поезжаева, also tr. Mariya Vasilyevna Poezzhaeva; born 3 March 1989) is a Russian actress in theater and cinema. She had leading roles in Corrections Class (2014) and He's a Dragon (2015).

== Biography ==
Maria Poezzhaeva was born in Perm, Perm Oblast, Russian SFSR, Soviet Union (now Perm Krai, Russia). In childhood, she studied figure skating at the palace of sports "Eaglet". She graduated from the Perm school No. 124 with a medal. After graduating, she tried to enter the theater school in Saint Petersburg and then in Moscow, but on both occasions was unsuccessful.

She returned to Perm, where she continued her studies. She again went to Moscow, and was accepted as a student at the Moscow Art Theater School. While in school, she performed in "The Hero of Our Time".

In 2012 she graduated from the Moscow Art Theater School (the course of K. Serebrennikov). After graduation she performed at the Moscow Art Theater A.P. Chekhov in the productions of "Fairies" and "Skylark". Later she became an actress at the Gogol Center.

== Career ==
Her screen work began in 2010. She played the role of Liza in the series Voices. Then there were small roles in Kamenskaya (sixth season, 2011). Also, she had roles in Last summer in Chulimsk (Sergey Bezrukov became a shooting partner). In 2014, she had a leading role in the film Corrections Class. In 2015 Maria she starred with Matvey Lykov in the romantic fantasy film He's a Dragon.

== Filmography ==
Year	Title	Role	Notes
2010	Voices	Liza in childhood	TV series
2011	Kamenskaya-6	Zlata Kalinina	TV series
2013	Last summer in Chulimsk	Valentina	
2013	Мотыльки (Inseparable)	Аля (Alya)	Movie
2014	Corrections Class	Lena Chekhova	
2014	Smiley	Anyuta	
2015	He's a Dragon {I Am Dragon}	Princess Miroslava "Mira"	
2016	The crisis of tender age	Shura Ermakova	TV Mini-Series
2018	VMayakovsky	Veronika Polonskaya	
2019	Sober Driver	activist girl	
2021	The Pilot. A Battle for Survival	Zina	
