= Doctor Liza (film) =

Doctor Lisa
- Film poster
- Directed by: Oksana Karas
- Written by: Aleksey Ilyushkin
- Produced by: Aleksandr Bondarev; Irina Borisova; Dzhanik Fayziev; Maria Ionova; Rafael Minasbekyan; Timur Weinstein
- Starring: Chulpan Khamatova; Konstantin Khabenskiy; Andrzej Chyra; Andrey Burkovsky; Alexey Agranovich
- Cinematography: Sergey Machilsky
- Production companies: Ivan; KIT Film Studio; Ministry of Culture of the Russian Federation; NTV Channel
- Distributed by: White Nights
- Release dates: September 2020 (Kinotavr); October 22, 2020 (Russia)
- Running time: 120 minutes
- Country: Russia
- Language: Russian

Doctor Lisa (Russian: Доктор Лиза) is a 2020 Russian biographical drama film directed by Oksana Karas, about Elizabeth Glinka, a Russian doctor, humanitarian worker and charity activist.

== Plot ==
The plot is of one day in the life of Elizabeth Glinka who is the head of Fair Care Foundation in Moscow in 2012. As the day starts, Elizabeth and her husband Gleb Glebovich Glinka are going to celebrate their 30th wedding anniversary. Elizabeth is waiting for her three sons and close friends to arrive.

Before the party, the last thing she needs to do is drop by Moscow Paveletsky Railway Station to check on weekly patients at the Fair Care fund and to send humanitarian supplies to people in need.

At the clinic, a man calls Doctor Lisa. In a hospital in the Moscow suburbs his five-year-old girl, Eva, who is dying. The doctor on duty has to discharge Eva. Due to medical formalities the child, who has cancer, is left without painkillers. Doctor Lisa agrees to help.

This request results in Doctor Lisa breaking the law for this girl.

== Production ==
Filming began in Moscow in April 2019.

Elizaveta Glinka's widower Gleb Glinka, who acted as a consultant to the filmmakers, starred in the role as a man at the station.

The premiere took place on September 13, 2020 at the Kinotavr 2020 festival.

== Cast and crew ==
Actor	Role
Chulpan Khamatova	Elizaveta Glinka
Andrzej Chyra	Gleb Glebovich Glinka
Andrey Burkovsky	Major FSKN Sergei Ivanovich Kolesov
Evgeny Pisarev	Sergei Petrovich, Glinka's partner
Konstantin Khabensky	Denis Valerievich Shevkunov, oncologist
Alexey Agranovich	Vladimir Alexandrovich, official
Timofey Tribuntsev	Gennady Vladimirovich Ershov, welder
Julia Aug	Elena Alexandrovna Zavyalova, head physician
Tatyana Dogileva	Tanya, homeless
Sergey Frolov	Yasha
Sergei Sosnovsky	Georgy Andreevich Flapovsky
Elena Koreneva	"Volochkova", a patient of Dr. Lisa
Alexey Vertkov	Lenya, psychiatrist
Philip Avdeev	Mikhail Savchuk, Eva's father
Andrey Tashkov	a pharmacist
Irina Grineva	Karina Muradovna Surbayeva, Inspector of the Guardianship and Guardianship Department
Natalya Tetenova	Doctor Lena
Taisiya Vilkova	pregnant girl
Nadezhda Karpova	Snow White
Gleb Glinka	man at the station

- Stage director: Oksana Karas
- Author of the script: Alexey Ilyushkin, Natalya Kudryashova, Oksana Karas, Alyona Sanko
- Director of photography: Sergey Machilsky, RGC
- Production Designer: Pavel Parkhomenko
- Composer: Yuri Poteenko
- Costume Designers: Ulyana Ryabova, Oleg Matrokhin
- Make-up artist: Anastasia Agaltsova
- Prop assistants: Tatyana Gordon, Maxim Sklyarov
- Casting director: Polina Mashinistova
- Director: Maxim Malinin
- Planning director: Elena Cherednichenko
- Editing directors: Vladimir Voronin, Olga Proshkina
- Sound engineer: Ivan Rips
- Second operator: Nikita Poznyansky
- Technical Director: Evgeniy Ryzhonkov
- Artist-decorator: Nikolai Alekseev, Sergey Shcherban, Mikhail Zubarev
- Music editor: Anastasia Zdeb
- Second directors: Tatyana Kolkova, Maria Libova
- Invoicing artist: Elizaveta Sorokoumovskaya
- Making plastic makeup: Alexey Ivchenko
- Key flu: Avtandil Iskandarov
- Playback operator: Vadim Martynenko
- Steadicam: Alexander Vdovenko
- Dolly: Alexander Vorobyov, Georgy Berdyugin
- Aerial filming: Air Cinema
- Stunt coordinator: Oleg Chemodurov
- Photographer: Alina Cherednychenko
- Location Manager: Ekaterina Gusarevich
- Executive Producer: Stanislav Botin
- Film director: Maria Botina
- Producers: Maria Ionova, Irina Borisova, Alexey Akhmedov, Tatyana Lukyanova
- Post-production producer: Tatyana Lukyanova
- Re-recording sound engineers: Ivan Rips, Vsevolod Vedyakin
- Noise design: Vsevolod Vedyakin
- Producer of NTV : Marina Shcherbacheva
- Co-producers: Vadim Ostrovsky, Ravil Salikhov
- Project producer: Alexander Bondarev
- General Producers: Rafael Minasbekyan, Janik Faiziev, Timur Weinstein and Alexey Zemsk

== Awards and nominations ==
- 2021 Golden Unicorn Awards: nominated for Best Film award.
- 2021 - Golden Eagle Award (Russia) - Best music (Yuri Poteyenko).
- 2021 - Nika Award - Best Actress (Chulpan Khamatova).
- 2021 - Nika Award - Best Supporting Actress (Tatyana Dogileva).
- 2020 - Kinotavr - Audience award.
- 2020 - VECHE XIV All-Russian Film Festival of Historical Films - Best Director (Oksana Karas).
- 2020 - VECHE XIV All-Russian Film Festival of Historical Films - "Prize of the Governor of the Novgorod Region"
