= Anton Gubankov =

Russian journalist and civil servant

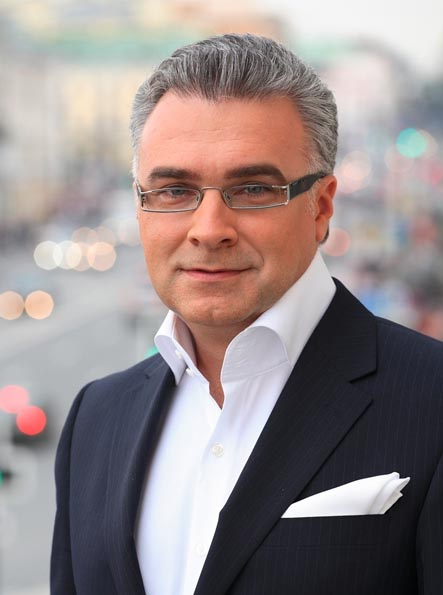
- Anton Gubankov
- Born: Anton Nikolayevich Gubankov; 29 January 1965; Leningrad, Soviet Union (now Saint Petersburg, Russia)
- Died: 25 December 2016 (aged 51); Black Sea near Sochi, Russia
- Occupations: TV journalist, civil servant

Anton Nikolayevich Gubankov (Russian: Антон Николаевич Губанков; 29 January 1965 – 25 December 2016) was a Russian journalist and civil servant. He worked as a television journalist until 2013. He served as the Director of the Department of Culture in the Russian Ministry of Defence from 2013 to 2016. In this role Gubankov popularised the term "polite people" (вежливые люди) referring to the unmarked Russian soldiers during the 2014 Russian annexation of Crimea. He died in the 2016 Russian Defence Ministry Tupolev Tu-154 crash when he was on his route to Syria with 63 members of the Alexandrov Ensemble with its director Valery Khalilov and 27 others which killed all 92 passengers on board, including Anton.

Gubankov graduated from the French Department of the Philology Faculty of Leningrad State University in 1987.
