= Sigarev =

Sigarev or Sigaryov (Russian: Сигарев or Сигарёв) is a Russian masculine surname, its feminine counterpart is Sigareva or Sigaryova. It may refer to

- Andrei Sigaryov (born 1993), Russian ice hockey player
- Vassily Sigarev (born 1977), Russian playwright, screenwriter and film director
- Alexander Sigarev, Russian ex-Head of Novorossiysk-based Novbiznesbank
