= 2016 Russian Defence Ministry Tupolev Tu-154 crash =

2016 aircraft accident in the Black Sea

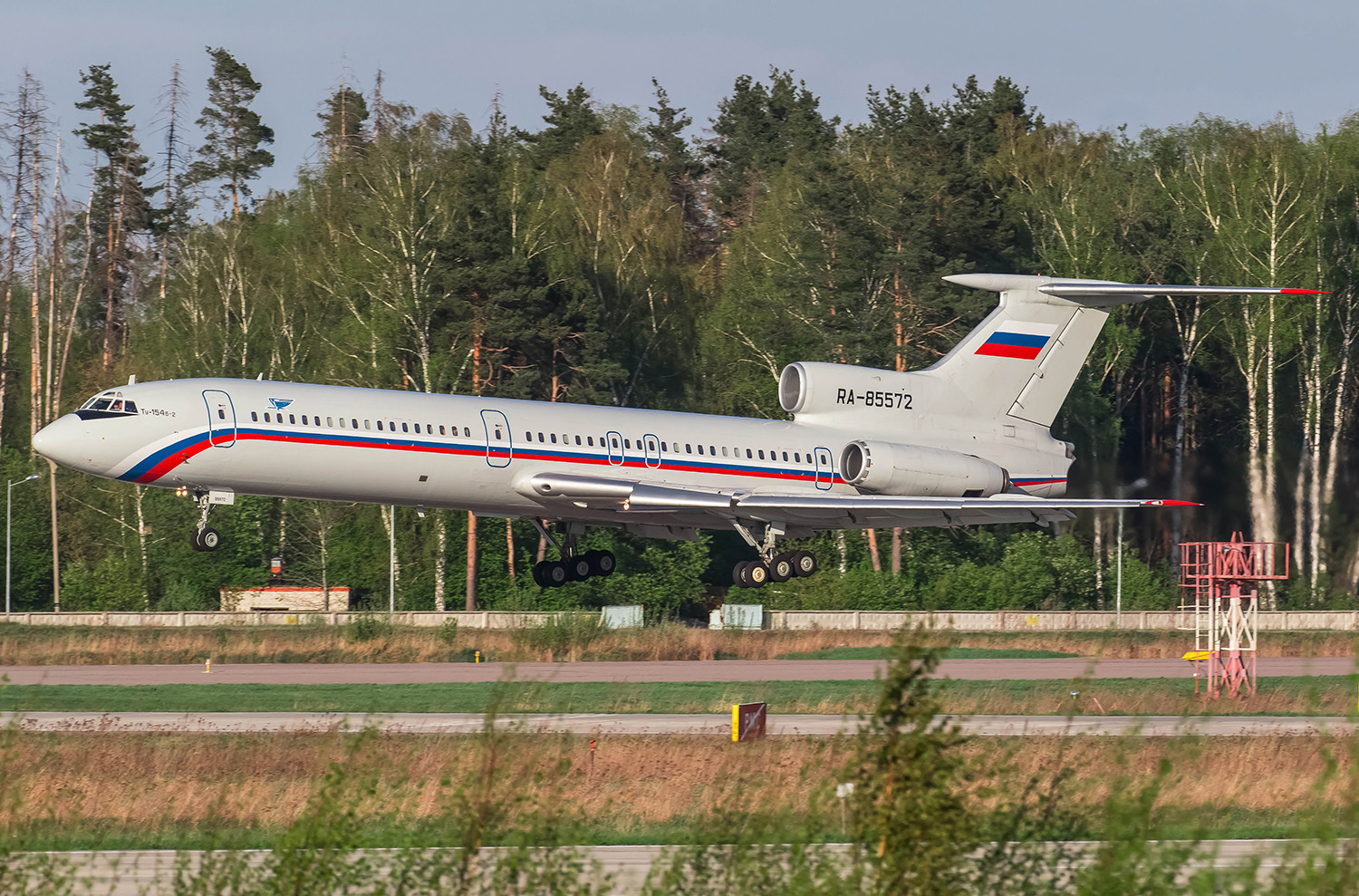
- RA-85572, the aircraft involved in the accident, photographed in May 2016

Accident
- Date: 25 December 2016
- Summary: Loss of control at night, spatial disorientation
- Site: Black Sea, approx 1.5 km (0.93 mi) off the coast from Sochi, Russia 288 km (178.95 mi) off the coast from Trabzon, Turkey; 43°25′30″N 39°50′13″E

Aircraft
- Aircraft type: Tupolev Tu-154B-2
- Operator: Russian Air Force
- Registration: RA-85572
- Flight origin: Chkalovsky Airport, Russia
- Stopover: Sochi International Airport, Sochi, Russia
- Destination: Khmeimim Air Base, Latakia, Syria
- Occupants: 92
- Passengers: 84
- Crew: 8
- Fatalities: 92
- Survivors: 0

On 25 December 2016, a Tupolev Tu-154 jetliner of the Russian Defence Ministry crashed into the Black Sea shortly after taking off from Sochi International Airport, Russia, while en route to Khmeimim Air Base, Syria, during the Russian military intervention in the war in Syria. All 92 passengers and crew on board, including 64 members of the Alexandrov Ensemble choir of the Russian Armed Forces, were killed. The aircraft had flown from Chkalovsky Airport and had landed at Sochi to refuel.

== Aircraft ==
The aircraft involved was a Tupolev 154B-2, tail number RA-85572, msn 83A-572, which had been in operation since 1983, and had flown for about 7,000 hours before the crash.

== Accident ==
Accident site within the western part of Russia

The Tupolev had taken off at 05:27 local time (02:27, 25 December 2016 (UTC)) from the Black Sea resort city of Sochi, Russia, where it had landed to refuel, bound for Syria. Two minutes after takeoff, the aircraft crashed into the Black Sea, 1.5 kilometres (0.9 mi) from the coast. Wreckage was found at a depth of 50 to 70 metres (160 to 230 ft). All 92 people on board were killed.

== Passengers and crew ==
Of the 92 passengers and crew on board, 64 were members of the Alexandrov Ensemble choir, the official choir of the Russian Armed Forces, including its director Valery Khalilov. The members of the Ensemble were travelling from Moscow to the Russian military base at Khmeimim near Latakia, Syria, to take part in New Year celebrations in a show for Russian troops participating in the Syrian War.

Among the other passengers were Russian soldiers, medical worker Elizaveta Glinka, the director of the Department of Culture for the Russian Ministry of Defence, Anton Gubankov, nine journalists (three each from Channel One Russia, NTV, and Zvezda), and two civilian officials.

The crew:

- Captain: Roman Alexandrovich Volkov, 35
- First Officer: Alexander Sergeevich Rovenskiy, 33
- Flight Engineer: Valery Nikolaevich Parikmaherov, 29
- Flight Engineer: Alexander Anatolievich Tregubov, 51
- Navigator: Alexander Nikolaevich Petukhov, 49
- Navigator: Andrei Vladimirovich Mamonov, 34
- Flight Operator: Alexei Olegovich Sukhanov, 31
- Flight Mechanic: Viktor Sergeevich Sushkov, 25

== Investigation ==
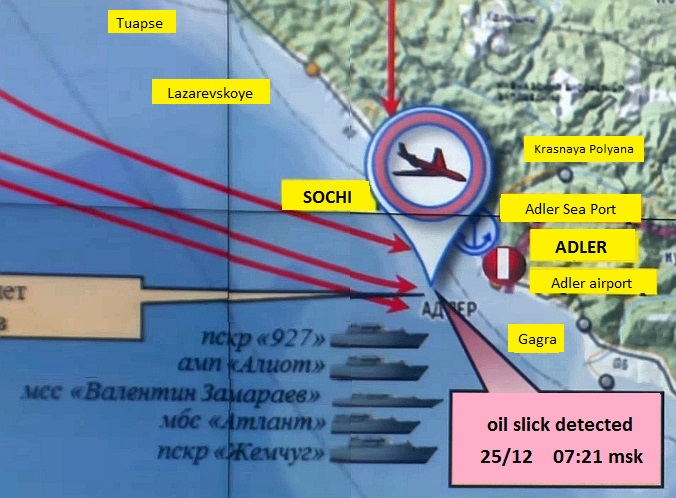
Map of crash site released by the Russian Ministry of Defence

By 27 December, the cockpit voice and flight data recorders had been located, and both were later recovered and sent to Moscow for analysis. By 28 December, the bodies of 18 people had been recovered from the sea. On 29 December, a third recorder, which backs up data from the CVR and FDR, was found, which, despite being damaged, revealed more information.

One Russian official downplayed the possibility of a terrorist attack as the cause of the crash, focusing more on the possibility of mechanical or human error. After the crash, all Tupolev Tu-154 aircraft in Russia were grounded.

A bright flash was purportedly caught on surveillance cameras along the Sochi coastline before the crash. Witnesses told reporters the plane appeared to experience trouble in gaining altitude, turned 180 degrees, started descending and crashed into the sea.

On 27 December, the Interfax news agency reported that Russian investigators believed the crash was due to a fault with the aircraft flaps. The Life.ru news portal was reported to have obtained a recording of the last words of one of the pilots: "The flaps, damn it. Commander, we are going down." There was no official confirmation.

On 29 December, it was announced by the Flight Safety Service of the Russian Ministry that a preliminary analysis of data from the cockpit voice recorder showed that no explosion had occurred on board.

On 16 January, the Interstate Aviation Committee, the civil authority in aviation accident investigation, announced that its representative would participate in the investigation.

On 19 January, Interfax reported that, during the underwater search, remains had also been found of a Soviet Douglas A-20 Havoc/DB-7 Boston bomber, supplied from the U.S. through the Lend-Lease agreement, which crashed on 15 November 1942.

On 31 May 2017, Russia's Kommersant said all the evidence pointed to the pilot, Maj Roman Volkov having suffered from somatogravic illusion. Analysis of the flight data suggested that the pilot had "lost his bearings and ignored his instruments, believing that the jet was climbing too sharply." Fatigue was thought to be a factor. Experts said that he was already feeling unwell on the ground and had trouble getting the plane on to the correct runway; he could not understand which of the two runways he was to take off from and which way to taxi. An escort vehicle was deployed to get him to the correct runway.

The criminal case was dismissed in December 2019 due to lack of corpus delicti. All materials of the investigation are classified.

== Reactions ==
Russia observed a national day of mourning on 26 December, at the declaration of President Vladimir Putin. Russian Defence Minister Sergey Shoigu ordered that the Moscow Military Music College be given the honorific Valery Khalilov.

On 28 December, French satirical weekly magazine Charlie Hebdo published several cartoons mocking the tragedy. In response, a Russian Defense Ministry spokesman said: "If such, I dare say, 'artistry' is the real manifestation of 'Western values', then those who hold and support them are doomed".

== See also ==
- List of Russian military accidents
- 1996 Belgian Air Force Hercules accident which also resulted in the loss of a military band
- Armavia Flight 967, a plane that crashed in 2006 near this accident's crash site
