= Ieva Andrejevaitė =

Lithuanian actress (born 1988)

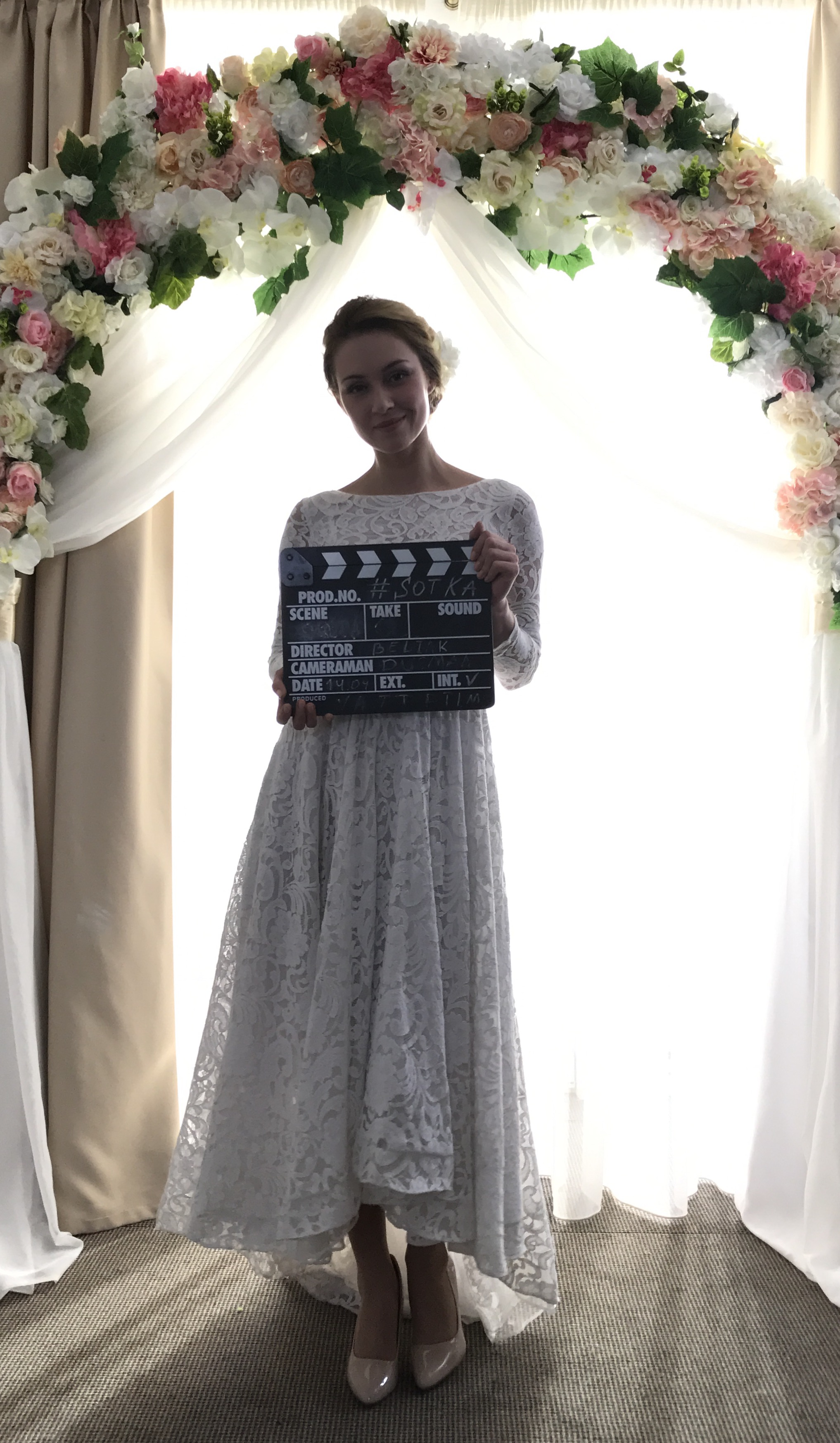
Ieva Andrejevaitė, 2017

Ieva Andrejevaitė (born 21 November 1988; Russian: Иева Андреевайте) is a Lithuanian actress.

== Biography ==
In an interview Ieva Andrejevaitė stated that was born in Moscow suburbs, to a Russian father and a Lithuanian mother, and the family moved to Vilnius, Lirthuania, in eight months. At various websites Vilnius is stated as her birthplace.

She graduated from the Lithuanian Academy of Music and Theatre. Her film debut was an episodic role in the short Nevykęs scenarijus. Her first larger role was in a Lithuanian-Georgian TV crime series Vyno kelias [Wine Way]. Later she moved to London, where we acted in the film Lithuanian-British film Juniper Crescent. In about half a year of difficult life in London, she moved to Moscow, where her real film career started. At the time she did not speak Russian well, but she learned it quickly. In 2013 she acted in the Russian film Startup (released in 2014), where she played her first major role, the wife of the protagonist Boris. Since then she acted in a number of Russian films, as well as in films in other countries. For many years she lived between Moscow and London.

== Selected filmography ==
- 2010: Nevykęs scenarijus, short, acting debut, episodic role
- 2012: Vyno kelias [Wine Way], TV series; a larger role debut, as Maria
- 2013: Juniper Crescent, abroad debut
- 2014: Startup, Russian film about Russin IT industry; the wife of the protagonist Boris; the first major role
- 2015: He's a Dragon, Russian romantic fantasy adventure film, as Princess Yaroslava
- 2016: Good Boy, Russian comedy film, as Alisa Denisovna
- 2017: Emilia from the Freedom Avenue, Lithuanian historical drama directed by Donatas Ulvydas, as a young actress Emilia. She was nominated for the Best Actress of the Year at the 2017 Silver Crane awards.
- 2018: Sotka, Ukrainian film; as Angelina
- 2019: Dear Dad, Russian comedy; as Olga, assistant to the main character Vadim Dyumin
- 2020: Skylines, American science fiction action film, as Alexi
- 2021, Pilgrims, Lithuanian crime drama; as Karolina
- 2021, Max Anger – With one eye open, Swedish drama/thriller TV series, as cab driver Mira Titerova, who becomes "partner in crime" of the main character".
- 2023: Five and a Half Love Stories in a Vilnius Apartment; as Teresa
- 2023-2025: Vilko gomurys (Wolf's Palate), translated as A Wolf's Prey, Lithuanian crime/thriller miniseries; as Silvija (supporting role)
- 2023: Tetris, biographical political thriller around Tetris; as Nina Pajitnov, wife of Alexey Pajitnov, author of Tetris
- 2024: All of You, American science fiction romantic drama; as Imma
