= VMayakovsky =

Film directed by Shane Alexander

- Directed by: Alexander Shein
- Written by: Vladimir Gromov; Vladimir Mayakovsky; Alexander Shein; Arkadi Vaksberg
- Produced by: Giya Lordkipanidze; Viktor Taknov; Vladimir Vodolagin
- Starring: Chulpan Khamatova; Yuri Kolokolnikov; Evgeniy Mironov; Anton Adasinsky; Albert Albers
- Cinematography: Jörg Gruber
- Edited by: Nikolai Molok
- Music by: Anton Adasinsky; Boris Andrianov; Demyan Kurchenko; Arseniy Trofim
- Production company: Cinemagroup
- Release date: 2018
- Country: Russia
- Language: Russian

VMayakovsky (Russian: ВМаяковский) is a 2018 Russian tragedy drama film directed and written by Alexander Shein. It stars Chulpan Khamatova and Yuri Kolokolnikov.

== Plot ==
The film tells about the famous Russian poet Vladimir Mayakovsky, his beloved women and friends who abandoned him, through the prism of the present...

== Cast ==
- Chulpan Khamatova
- Yuri Kolokolnikov
- Evgeniy Mironov
- Anton Adasinsky
- Albert Albers
- Mikhail Efremov
- Lyudmila Maksakova
- Maria Poezzhaeva
- Miriam Sekhon
