= Faces of Love Film Festival =

Faces of Love International Film Festival (Russian: Международный кинофестиваль «Лики Любви») is a festival first based in Moscow, then in 2005 moved to Sochi, Russia. It is a sister festival of the biggest film festival in Russia, Kinotavr. Faces of Love is a special interest film festival highlighting films about love.

The president of Faces of Love, as well as of Kinotavr, is Russia's famous actor and producer Mark Rudinstein. Legendary French actress Catherine Deneuve is an honorary president of the festival.

The first Faces of Love festival was held in Moscow in 1995. It was an annual film festival welcoming filmmakers from all over the world. The festival is in hiatus at the moment due to financial difficulties.

Every year, around 50 films from all over the world are being shown at the festival both in competition, screening and retrospective programs.

Festival is recognized by FIAPF.

== Jury ==
The jury of the main competition consists of no fewer than 7 people. The jury of the short film competition consists of no fewer than 4 people.

Faye Dunaway, Kate Winslet, Goldie Hawn, Kurt Russell, Alain Delon, Udo Kier, Brenda Blethyn, Chiara Mastroianni, Christopher Lambert among many others were jurors and guests of the festival over the history.

== Awards ==
The main award of the festival is Grand Prix for the best film .

The following categories are awarded at the festival:

- Best film
- Best romantic duet
- Best actress
- Best actor
- Best short film
- Audience award

Throughout the history of the festival, following films, actors and directors were awarded: Amores Perros directed by Alejandro Gonzales Inarritu, Julianne Moore and Dennis Haysbert for the best romantic duet in Far from Heaven, Maggie Gyllenhaal for the best actress in Secretary, The Isle directed by Ki-duk Kim, Michael Haneke for La Pianiste, Toni Collette and Gotaro Tsunashima for the best romantic duet in Japanese story, Asghar Farhadi for Beautiful City, Aleksandr Sokurov for Taurus.

== See also ==
- Kinotavr
