= Aleksey Fedorchenko =

Russian film director

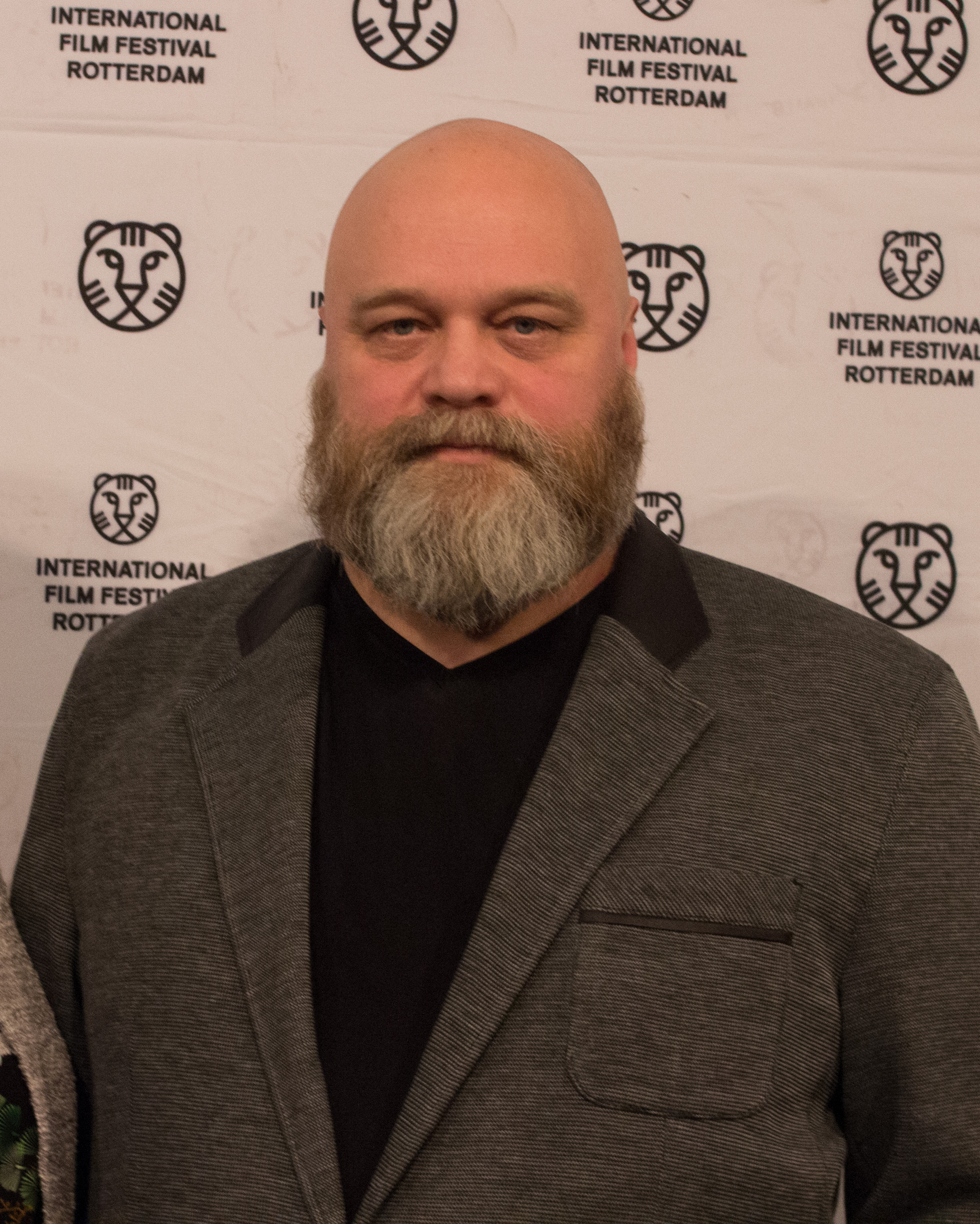
- Aleksey Fedorchenko at the 47th International Film Festival Rotterdam
- Born: September 29, 1966 (age 59); Yekaterinburg, Russian SFSR

Aleksey Fedorchenko (Russian: Алексе́й Станисла́вович Федо́рченко; born 1966) is a film director from Yekaterinburg, Russia who won accolades at the Venice Film Festival with the mockumentary First on the Moon (2005) and later with Silent Souls (2010), a magical realist tale about the long-extinct Finnic tribe of Merya. His 2012 film Celestial Wives of the Meadow Mari has been selected to be screened in the Vanguard section at the 2013 Toronto International Film Festival.

As of 2013, Fedorchenko was involved in producing Space Mowgli, an adaptation of a science fiction novella by the Strugatsky brothers.

Fedorchenko's film Anna's War won the Russian Golden Eagle Award in the Best Film category. He also won the award for Best Director.

== Filmography ==
- First on the Moon (2005)
- Shosho (2006)
- Railway (2008)
- Silent Souls (2010)
- Celestial Wives of the Meadow Mari (2012)
- Angels of Revolution (2014)
- Anna's War (2018)
- The Last Darling Bulgaria (2021)
- Big Snakes of Ulli-Kale (2022)
- Mitrofan Aksyonov's Sausage (2023)
- New Berlin (2023)
