= Celestial Wives of the Meadow Mari =

2012 film

- Film poster
- Directed by: Aleksei Fedorchenko
- Starring: Yuliya Aug
- Release date: 11 November 2012 (Italy)
- Running time: 106 minutes
- Country: Russia
- Language: Mari

Celestial Wives of the Meadow Mari (Meadow Mari: Олык марий пылвомыш вате-влак, Russian: Небесные жёны луговых мари, translit. Nebesnye zheny lugovykh mari) is a 2012 Russian erotic drama film directed by Aleksei Fedorchenko. The film was shot in Mari language and tells 23 different tales influenced by the Mari folklore. Each of these stories represents the specific approach to sexuality of "the last authentic pagans in Europe". In view of this, the film could be considered a Mari "Decameron".

The film won the main prize at the 12th New Horizons Film Festival, Wrocław, and was screened in the Vanguard section at the 2013 Toronto International Film Festival.

== Cast ==
- Yuliya Aug
- Yana Esipovich
- Vasiliy Domrachyov
- Darya Ekamasova
- Olga Dobrina
- Yana Troyanova
- Olga Degtyaryova
- Aleksandr Ivashkevich
- Yana Sekste

== Reception ==
The film was awarded Grand Prix and 20.000 EUR at the New Horizons Film Festival in Wrocław. The verdict of the jury (Béla Tarr, Dominga Sotomayor-Castillo, Edgar Pêra, Joanna Kos-Krauze and Christoph Terhechte) was as follows:

"For the tenderness, empathy, respect for the human dignity with a great sense of humor and imagination.
This film makes a hope for the freedom of arts and also features the most likeable zombie in film history."
