= Kokoko =

- Film poster
- Russian: Кококо
- Directed by: Dunya Smirnova
- Written by: Anna Parmas; Dunya Smirnova
- Produced by: Sergey Selyanov
- Starring: Anna Mikhalkova; Yana Troyanova; Anna Parmas; Yulia Snigir; Konstantin Shelestun
- Cinematography: Maksim Osadchiy-Korytkovskiy
- Release date: June 14, 2012
- Country: Russia
- Language: Russian

Kokoko (Russian: Кококо) is a 2012 Russian comedy-drama film directed by Dunya Smirnova.

== Plot ==
Lisa (Anna Mikhalkova), a dedicated researcher employed at the Kunstkamera, embarks on a journey to St.Petersburg. While on her way, she happens to come across Vika (Yana Troyanova), a restaurant hostess from Yekaterinburg. Coincidentally, Vika is also making her way to St. Petersburg, albeit with a distinct objective - to immerse herself in the vibrant atmosphere and revel in the city's vibrant offerings purely for pleasure and leisure.

While on the train, unfortunate circumstances befall them as their bags, containing all their valuable documents and money, are stolen. Left with no means to navigate through this challenging situation, Lisa invites Vika to temporarily stay at her house.

Through Vika’s efforts, the life of a museum worker will turn into a series of endless parties. However, as their friendship begins to blossom, unforeseen tensions arise, causing their relationship to transition from camaraderie to a full-blown conflict.

Within the realms of these two contrasting worlds, two heroines coexist: Lisa, an intellectual who is torn between her indecisiveness and her heightened sensitivity, unable to break free from her past relationship with her ex-husband; and Vika, a vibrant and accessible character who exudes confidence, yet possesses an endearing naivety and innate kindness in certain aspects of her life.

Due to a web of complicated emotions, circumstances, and actions, Lisa almost becomes a murderer, and Vika ends up behind bars.

== Cast ==
- Anna Mikhalkova as Lisa
- Yana Troyanova as Vika
- Anna Parmas
- Yulia Snigir as Natasha (as Yuliya Snigir)
- Konstantin Shelestun as Kirill
- Yevgeny Muravich as Mitya
- Lyubov Arkus
- Sergey Borisov as Valerian
- Tatyana Ryabokon
- Gennadiy Smirnov as Lyonya

== Making the Film ==
Dunya Smirnova about the film: I came up with the idea to tell about a strong female friendship between two completely alien souls, in which there will be mutual attraction, a period of happiness, and a period of terrible discord. [...] This is a love story of two souls. I'm terribly glad that this is not the story of a man and a woman; there is no erotic fervor here, all passions boil exclusively in the soul. But souls have no gender (or have both genders), so it’s terribly interesting for me to observe in what situations one becomes a support for the other, and in what situations - on the contrary, in which each of them takes responsibility for the other, because they constantly change roles.
