= He's a Dragon =

- Theatrical release poster
- Russian: Он – дракон
- Directed by: Indar Dzhendubaev
- Written by: Sergey Dyachenko; Indar Dzhendubaev; Aleksey Arsenev; Roman Nepomnyashchy
- Based on: The Ritual by Marina and Sergey Dyachenko
- Produced by: Timur Bekmambetov; Natalia Smirnova; Igor Tsay; Maria Zatulovskaya; Yakov Gordin
- Starring: Maria Poezzhaeva; Matvey Lykov; Stanislav Lyubshin; Ieva Andrejevaitė; Pyotr Romanov
- Cinematography: Sergei Trofimov
- Edited by: Maria Likhachyova
- Music by: Simon Finley
- Production companies: Bazelevs Production; Mindstream Productions; Splendid Film; Cinema Fund
- Distributed by: Bazelevs Distribution; Netflix (International)
- Release date: December 3, 2015 (Russia)
- Running time: 110 minutes
- Country: Russia
- Language: Russian
- Budget: $18 million ₽300 million
- Box office: $10,495,305; ₽126,557,888 (Russia, February 2016); CN¥60.1 million (China)

He's a Dragon or He is Dragon (Russian: Он – дракон, romanized: On – drakón), also in English territories titled as I Am Dragon, and in Germany Dragon: Love is a Scary Tale, is a 2015 Russian 3D romantic fantasy adventure film written and directed by Indar Dzhendubaev and produced by Timur Bekmambetov's company Bazelevs. The two main roles are played by Maria Poezzhaeva and Matvey Lykov. The film is loosely based on Marina and Sergey Dyachenko's 1996 fantasy novel The Ritual.

The action takes place in a fictional fantasy world, which is a stylistic fusion of Kievan Rus' with Scandinavian, Celtic and Eastern traditions. The plot is about Princess Miroslava (Poezzhaeva) being abducted by a dragon and carried away to its lair on a remote island, where she encounters a mysterious young man named Arman (Lykov).

The film was theatrically released in Russia by Bazelevs Distribution on December 3, 2015, in RealD 3D, followed by streaming on Netflix. It was the highest-grossing Russian film at the international box office in 2016.

== Plot ==
In the Kievan Rus' of European epics, a local village lived in fear of a terrifying Dragon. To appease the creature, the villagers performed rituals in which they offered young maidens as sacrifices and sang an ancient song to summon the dragon. One year, after the dragon abducted a maiden, her lover, a brave knight, traveled to the dragon's island. After he discovered she was already dead, the knight fought and defeated the dragon after a fierce battle. The knight became known as the Dragon Slayer and the dreaded ritual was transformed into a wedding ceremony.

Many years later, the young Princess Miroslava (Maria Poezzhaeva), Mira for short, is betrothed to Igor, the Dragon Slayer's grandson. Her father and her sister Yaroslava consider her immature, as she still likes fairy tales and playing with toys. Mira is placed on a boat deck in her wedding finery to be sent across the water to her future husband, Igor. As the groom to be pulls her boat towards him, his people sing the ancient ritual song. The dragon, who was thought to have been dead, captures Mira from the ceremony and takes her to his island.

Mira is held prisoner in a cave where she meets a creature that serves as a sentry for the dragon and a young man (Matvey Lykov) who cannot remember his name. Believing he is another prisoner, Mira calls him Arman, but she soon discovers that Arman is the dragon. He lives in a human form, but sometimes turns into a dragon against his will. As a dragon, Arman is unable to control himself. Arman shows Mira around the island and gives her a place to live while waiting for Igor.

Arman reveals that as a dragon boy, he was allowed to choose whether to stay as a human or become a dragon. He chose to remain as a human until the Dragon Slayer killed his father. In his grief and rage, he transformed into a dragon, gaining the knowledge of his predecessors, including the maidens sacrificed to them. To avoid harming people, Arman lives in isolation on the island. Whenever he senses the impending transformation, he goes into the cave, where the dragon form is too big to escape. Earlier, when he heard the ritual song, he spontaneously transformed with no time to go into the cave, and abducted Mira following his instincts.

Touched by his earnestness, Mira talks with Arman and teaches him to live as a human. As they get to know one another, Arman and Mira fall in love although Mira is still afraid of the dragon.

The island is bewitched so that only those who are loved by someone on the island can find it. As Mira slowly falls in love with Arman, the island is hidden from Igor, who searches futilely in a fog. Igor, who does not share his grandfather's bravery, tries to turn back. However, his helmsman reminds him of his oath and does not allow him to turn back less he dishonors his family name.

Mira's fear of the dragon causes her to secretly prepare a boat in order to escape. Learning of her preparations, Arman doubts he will ever being able to control the dragon. He reveals the real reason why dragons had brought maidens to the island: they are burnt to death and from the ashes of each maiden, a new dragon was born. Arman tells Mira to leave to avoid this fate.

Mira returns home after finding Igor's boat in the fog. In land, it is revealed that Yaroslava secretly loves Igor's honorable helmsman, and her father encourages her to follow her heart's desire. While preparing again for her wedding with Igor, Mira realizes that she loves Arman and leaves an infuriated Igor during the ceremony. Sitting on the boat, Mira sings the ritual song. Arman, meanwhile, is preparing to end his life when he hears the song. The dragon takes over, captures Mira and brings her to the island, intending to burn her. Mira does not show fear to the dragon and confesses her love for him. This allows Arman to finally control himself as a dragon.

Years later, Mira and Arman are living together on the island with their daughter. Mira flies on her dragon-husband, who is no longer dangerous to her, and during the flight, Arman changes into his human form and the two share a kiss.

== Cast ==
- Maria Poezzhaeva as Princess Miroslava "Mira"
- Matvey Lykov as Arman / Dragon
  - Ivo Gospodinov as Arman as a boy
- Stanislav Lyubshin as Prince, Miroslava's father
- Ieva Andrejevaite as Princess Yaroslava, Miroslava's older sister
- Pyotr Romanov as Igor, grandson of the Dragon Slayer and Miroslava's fiancé
- Andrey Lebedinsky as Igor's helmsman
- Yola Sanko as an old woman-priestess
- Daria Dubnikova as a bride-victim to the Dragon
- Victoria Runtsova as a bride (1)
- Anastasia Dubrovina as a bride (2)
- Alyona Chekhova as a bride (3)
- Lyubov Firsova as the mother of the bride (1)
- Yuri Gorin as the father of the bride
- Aleksandr Luchinin as the Dragon Slayer, Igor's grandfather
- Egor Zubarchuk as Arman's father
- Victor Korolyov
- Marta Timofeeva as Mira and Arman's daughter

== Production ==
=== Development ===
He's a Dragon was the feature film directorial debut of Indar Dzhendubaev. To the post of director he was invited by Timur Bekmambetov, who acted as the main producer of the film. Filming took place in the Black Sea.

According to the creators of the film, they have preserved much of the literary original, but at the same time brought new elements to the story.

The film, 85% of which consisted of computer graphics, was drawn with the help of Russian computers.

The posters for the film were created at a 16-hour photo shoot by the photographer Uldus Bakhtiozina. During shooting, only film cameras were used, and the resulting pictures were not subjected to any additional processing, which is an absolute rarity for posters of modern films.

=== Filming ===
Principal photography took place at the beginning that August 2014 in Bulgaria is the main scenes were shot on the Black Sea coast and in the picturesque Prohodna cave.

Then the crew will go to the Black Sea coast, in the town of Sinemorets. The Bulgarian stage of filming will end on September 26, 2014, in December 2014 the remaining scenes will be shot in Moscow, Russia.

In the Moscow Pavilions, the initial scenes were completed: the abduction of the main character, flying a dragon, scenes in his den and the finale.

=== Music ===
The score was composed by Simon Finley. Russian folk-rock band Melnitsa (ru) recorded a song for the film titled "Rite" (whose title and lyrics reference the novel "The Ritual", on which the film is based). It was, however, not included in the final film. Singer-songwriter Jenia Lubich contributed to the soundtrack with her song Колыбельная тишины (Lullaby of Silence), which plays over the end credits. A music video was released on December 7, 2015, and has over 5 million views on YouTube. The song later appeared on her 2016 studio album Снежно (Snowy).

=== Post-production ===
The film's special effects were worked by professionals from the CGF (ru) computer graphics studio, directed by Aleksandr Gorokhov, who had previously been involved in the production of such films.

== Release ==
On November 24, 2015, in Moscow hosted the magnificent premiere took place at the cinema "Karo 11 October". The film was released in the Russian Federation by Bazelevs Distribution on December 3, 2015, and the world premiere of December 4, 2015. The film was released in the United States by 4Digital Media on 6 June 2017.

=== Marketing ===
The first trailer was released in the United States in April 2017.

== Reception ==
=== Box office ===
The film flopped at the Russian box office, collecting only $1.7 million (114 million rubles), and in view of rentals in other CIS countries – $1.8 million, which is significantly less than the film's budget of $18 million. It, however, had great success at the Chinese box office, grossing CN¥60.1 million, making it the most successful film in China in the history of Russian cinema. It was the overall highest-grossing Russian film at the international box office in 2016.

=== Critical response ===
The film was met with mixed reviews. Such publications as Film.ru, The Hollywood Reporter, Izvestia and Afisha, responded positively to the film. Boris Ivanov, film critic of Film.ru, stated: "From whatever angle you look at it, the Hollywood movie "Twilight" seems like an amateur performance in comparison to "I am Dragon". Even the computer effects in the Russian production are more convincing. From the point of view of the genre, this is an almost impeccable "feminine" romantic fantasy."

Dmitry Ostashevsky, Russian film critic of The Hollywood Reporter, stated: "The computer animation and 3D graphics are so good that you begin to regret that such a cool dragon (that is, by the way, recognised as the most technologically complex virtual character in the whole history of Russian cinema) was chosen for the genre of melodrama and not blockbuster."

Others, in particular Mir Fantastiki, Weburg, and Kino-Teatr, rated it as average. Russian Gazette critically panned the film, calling it "unimaginably boring", and the script "delusional".

== See also ==
- Damsel (2024 film)
