= Wolfy (film) =

- Russian: Волчок
- Directed by: Vasily Sigarev
- Written by: Vasily Sigarev
- Produced by: Roman Borisevich; Ruben Dishdishyan
- Starring: Polina Pluchek; Yana Troyanova; Veronika Lysakova; Marina Gapchenko; Galina Kuvshinova
- Cinematography: Aleksei Arsentyev
- Edited by: Dasha Danilova
- Production company: Koktebel Film Studio
- Release date: 2009
- Running time: 88 min.
- Country: Russia
- Language: Russian

Wolfy (Russian: Волчок, romanized: Volchok) is a 2009 Russian psychological drama film directed by Vasily Sigarev.

== Plot ==
The film tells about a girl whose mother is in prison. Returning home, she gives her daughter a small toy: Wolfy. By the way, this name is suitable for the girl herself, because she could have grown into a real wolf if she had not loved her mother so much.

== Cast ==
- Polina Pluchek as Daughter
- Yana Troyanova as Mother
- Veronika Lysakova as Older Daughter
- Marina Gapchenko as Grandma
- Galina Kuvshinova as Sister
- Andrei Dymshakov as Uncle Kolya
- Elena Ilyina as lesbian
- Ivan Izhevsky as Cop at the Station
- Yevgeniy Volotskiy as First Policeman
- Aleksey Rozin as Second Policeman

== Awards ==
- 2009 Kinotavr: Best Screenplay
- 2009 Karlovy Vary International Film Festival: Don Quijote Award - Special Mention
- 2009 Russian Guild of Film Critics: Best Film and Best Debut
- 2009 Zurich Film Festival: International Feature Film
