= Elena Pogrebizhskaya =

Russian journalist, director, screenwriter, singer and musician

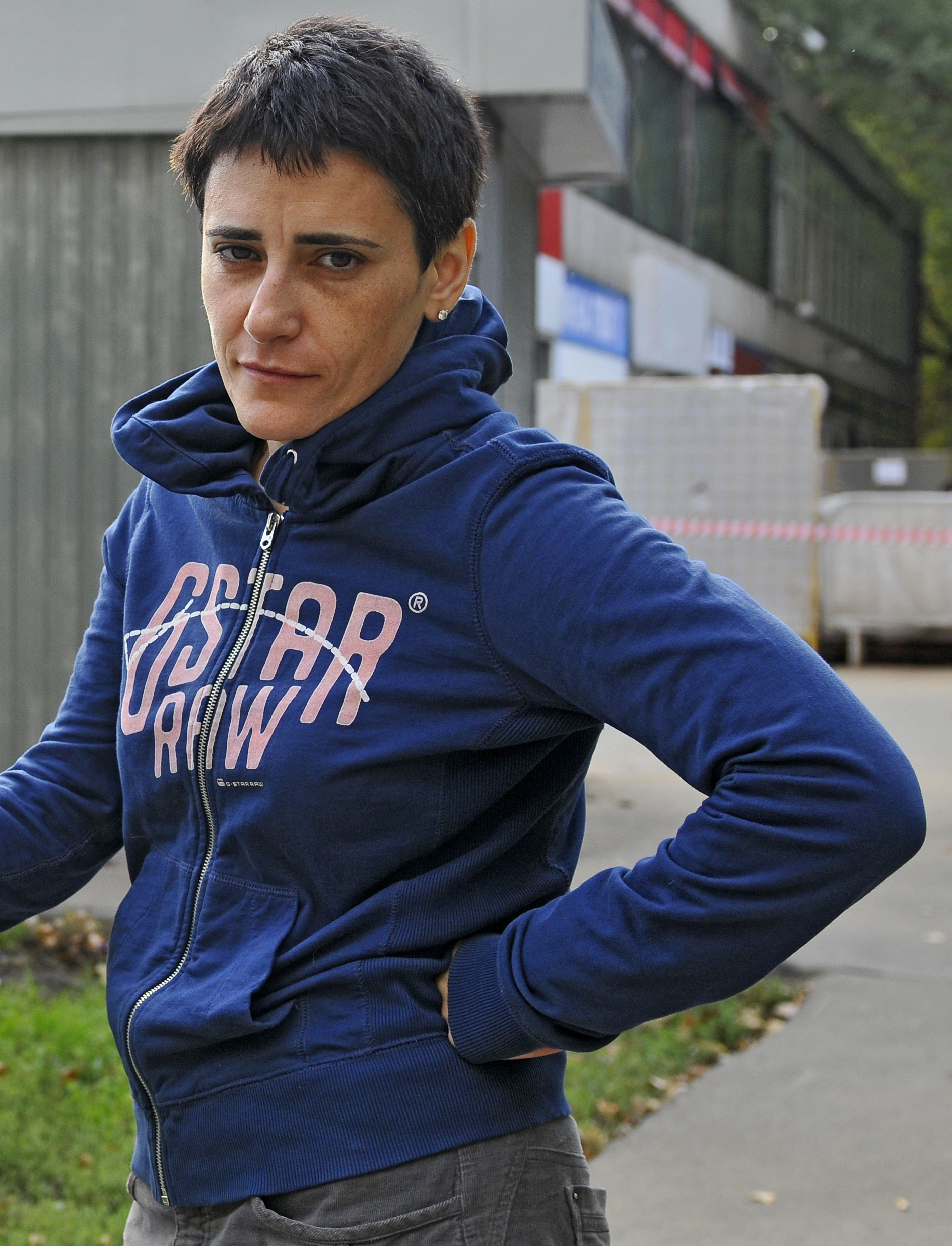
- Born: 1 October 1972 (age 53); Kamenka, Vyborgsky District, Leningrad Oblast, RSFSR, USSR
- Occupation: Filmmaker
- Awards: TEFI (2008, 2009), Laurel branch (premium) (2008); International Human Rights Film Festival "Stalker" (2013)
- Website: www.partizanets.com

Elena Vladimirovna Pogrebizhskaya (Russian: Елена Владимировна Погреби́жская) (born 1 October 1972) is a Russian screenwriter and director of documentary films, and former leader of the rock band Butch. In the 1990s and early 2000s, she worked as a journalist and TV host.

== Early life and education ==
Pogrebizhskaya was born in Kamenka, Leningrad Oblast. In 1993, she graduated from the Russian Philology department of the Vologda State Pedagogical University. In 1995, she graduated from the MSU Faculty of Journalism, Television department.

== Journalism ==
In the middle of the 1990s, Elena Pogrebizhskaya worked as news reporter at a national Russian TV station Channel 1. Pogrebizhskaya covered events in the Kremlin and interviewed President Boris Eltsin. When war broke out in the Balkans, Pogrebizhskaya and her news crew were present on both sides of the conflict, in Albania and in Serbia. Pogrebizhskaya reported on the war in Chechnya, including from refugee camps. After Putin became president, Pogrebizhskaya left the news field because she decided that that work became too muddied.

== Musical career ==
In 2001, Pogrebizhskaya decided to pursue musical career. Her rock group Butch recorded 4 albums, selling one hundred thousand discs. She said that her decision to become a rock-musician grew from a desire to be in a spotlight and receive public attention. Eventually, she felt that she didn’t use her intellectual abilities in a musical career and decided to move on.

== Films ==
In 2007, Pogrebizhskaya announced an end to her music career and emerged as a film director. Her films Blood Trader and Doctor Liza received TEFI awards in 2008 and 2009 for Best Russian Documentary Film.

In 2011, Pogrebizhskaya founded her own cinema studio 'Partizanets'. She made a series of documentaries dedicated to psychological disorders. The first film was titled 'Me and My Neurosis'. Pogrebizhskaya suffered from this condition since 2004 and it took her 2.5 years to heal. The money for the films were collected by crowdfunding. The next film was dedicated to posttraumatic syndrome. In 2017, she made a movie 'Fat and Slim', dedicated to people with eating disorders.

Released in 2013, her film 'Mama, I'll kill you' got Amnesty International prize at the Film Festival in Pesaro in 2014, as well as awards of the Black Maria, Jersey, and NorCal Film Festivals. The documentary shows lives of three children, Alexander, Nastya and Alexey, in an orphan boarding school in Moscow region. The movie got a wide response, even on a governmental level because it showed dramatic lives of orphans in asylum, while all the adults thought it were the best possible place for the children. Eventually, the film became one of the factors that led to a legislative reform related to the rights of the child and overall orphanage care system in Russia. In 2020, Pogrebizhskaya made a sequel, 'Mama, I'll Kill You 2', that showed the same characters 7 years later. After the reform, kids were taken into foster families and their old orphanage was closed.

In 2014, she received the Grand Prix of the Internet Media Awards.

In 2017, she released a film Andreeva Case about a power-lifting champion Tatiana Andreeva, who stabbed a man for harassing her, after which she got 6 years of prison for murder. Pogrebizhskaya showed in her movie all inconsistencies of investigation, confessions and statements of witnesses.

Pogrebizhskaya currently hosts a “Cinema Club with Elena Pogrebizhskaya” at the Moscow Tolerance Centre. In one of her interviews, Pogrebizhskaya stated that: “Film is the surest means of conveying emotions. Through cinema, the problems of another become fully understandable to anyone who sits in the audience. This is better than any speech or exhortation.” The discussions that Pogrebizhskaya holds after the film showings strengthen this effect manifold.

In 2018, she launched an online cinema club called Psychologies.

Elena's main place of work since 2021 is her YouTube channel "Films of Elena Pogrebizhskaya". There are almost two million subscribers there now.
