= Vasily Sigarev =

Russian film director, screenwriter, and playwright

Vassily Sigarev
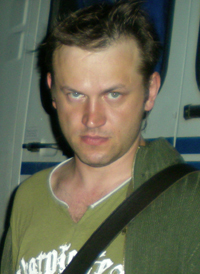
- Vassily Sigarev in 2018
- Born: Vassily Vladimirovich Sigarev; January 11, 1977 (age 49); Verkhnyaya Salda, Sverdlovsk Oblast, Soviet Union
- Education: Yekaterinburg Theatre Institute
- Occupations: Film director, screenwriter, playwright
- Years active: 2000–present
- Works: Wolfy, Living, The Land of Oz,
- Awards: Kinotavr: Best Director, 2012 and Best Screenplay, 2009 and 2015

Vassily Vladimirovich Sigarev (Russian: Васи́лий Владимирович Си́гарев, born 11 January 1977, Verkhnyaya Salda, Sverdlovsk Oblast, Soviet Union) is a Russian playwright, screenwriter and film director. His plays Plasticine, Black Milk and Ladybird were first produced in the West by the Royal Court Theatre, in 2002, 2003 and 2004, respectively. In 2002, Sigarev was named the winner of the Charles Wintour Award for Most Promising Playwright given out by the Evening Standard for Plasticine.

== Biography ==
Sigarev was born in 1977, in Verkhnyaya Salda, Sverdlovsk Oblast, a small town 180 kilometers (110 mi) north of Yekaterinburg, into a working-class family. He studied at the Nizhny Tagil Pedagogical Institute and graduated from the Yekaterinburg Theatre Institute where he studied under Nikolay Kolyada.

== Theater ==
The subject matter of Sigarev's plays is the decay of post-Soviet Russia. Plasticine deals with child rape, Black Milk features a husband and wife team of con men in an abusive relationship, while the main characters of Ladybird steal cemetery markers to sell them to raise money for booze.

=== U.S. Productions ===
Ladybird had its American premiere at The Bootleg Theatre in Los Angeles in 2007.

Sigarev's work had not been seen in New York until a production of Black Milk was produced Off-Broadway in July 2012, at the 13th Street theater. Directed by Columbia M.F.A. student Michel Hausmann, the production received mixed reviews. Alexis Soloski of the Village Voice called it an ..."unnuanced, indifferently acted production". nytheatre.com called it "strong piece of theatre, taking its audience headfirst into a deserted wasteland of fear, confused morals and a profound fall from purity. With resonating performances, impeccable design and a truthful directorial vision"

== Cinema ==
Sigarev has directed three films, Volchok, which was made in 2009 and which he adapted from his own play, Zhit (Living) (2012) and The Land of Oz (2015). He also wrote the screenplay for Prodayotsya detektor lzhi (2005), which is based on his plays Detektor lzhi and Fantomnye boli. In his 2021 interview with Yury Dud Sigarev mentioned Elem Klimov's Come and See as the film that influenced him the most.

== Personal life ==
Sigarev lives in Moscow and was married to Russian actress Yana Troyanova from 2013 to 2020.

Sigarev openly supports Alexei Navalny and was detained at 2021 Russian protests.

== Filmography ==
Films by Vasily Sigarev
| Year | Title | Title in Russian | Director | Writer | Awards |
|---|---|---|---|---|---|
| 2005 | Lie Detector for Sale | Продаётся детектор лжи | | Yes | |
| 2009 | Wolfy | Волчок | Yes | Yes | 12 wins and 6 nominations |
| 2012 | Living | Жить | Yes | Yes | 9 wins and 8 nominations |
| 2014 | Goodbye Mom | До свидания, мама | | Yes | 1 win and 1 nomination |
| 2015 | The Land of Oz | Страна ОЗ | Yes | Yes | 5 wins and 11 nominations |
| 2018 | Guppy Fish | Гупёшка | | Yes | |

== Selected Plays ==
- Plasticine
- Black Milk
- Ladybird

== Awards and nominations ==
=== Winner ===
- 2002 Evening Standard Theatre Awards: Charles Wintour Award for Most Promising Playwright for Plasticine
- 2009 Kinotavr: Best Screenplay for Wolfy
- 2009 Karlovy Vary International Film Festival: Don Quijote Award - Special Mention for Wolfy
- 2009 Russian Guild of Film Critics: Best Film and Best Debut for Wolfy
- 2009 Zurich Film Festival: International Feature Film for Wolfy
- 2012 Kinotavr: Best Director for Living
- 2012 Thessaloniki Film Festival: Special Artistic Achievement for Living
- 2012 Wiesbaden goEast: Golden Lily and FIPRESCI Prize for Living
- 2015 Kinotavr: Best Screenplay and Prize of the Guild of Russian Film Scholars and Film Critics for The Land of Oz
- 2016 Festival de l'Europe autour de l'Europe: Prix Luna for The Land of Oz

=== Nominations ===
- 2010 Nika Awards: Best Film and Discovery of the Year for Wolfy
- 2010 Nika Awards: Best Film and Best Director for Living
