= Kinotavr =

Film festival in Sochi, Russia

- New festival logo from 2006
- Location: Sochi, Russia
- Language: Russian
- Website: http://www.kinotavr.ru/en/

Kinotavr (Russian: Кинотавр), also known as the Sochi Open Russian Film Festival, was an open film festival held in the resort city of Sochi, Russia annually in June since 1991, until it was cancelled in the wake of the 2022 Russian invasion of Ukraine. Alexander Rodnyansky said: "This year the festival will not take place, it will be rescheduled for a period when we survive the current political events and can return to the cinema, including to understand what happened to the country and to all of us."

From 1994 to 2005 the festival consisted of two parts: the Open Russian Film Festival (ORFF) and the International Film Festival (IFF). As of 2008 it was the largest national film festival in Russia. There is a second film festival, known as Sochi International Film Festival and Awards.

The word Kinotavr is a portmanteau (in Russian) of "Cinema" and "...taur" (as in Centaur or Minotaur).

== History ==
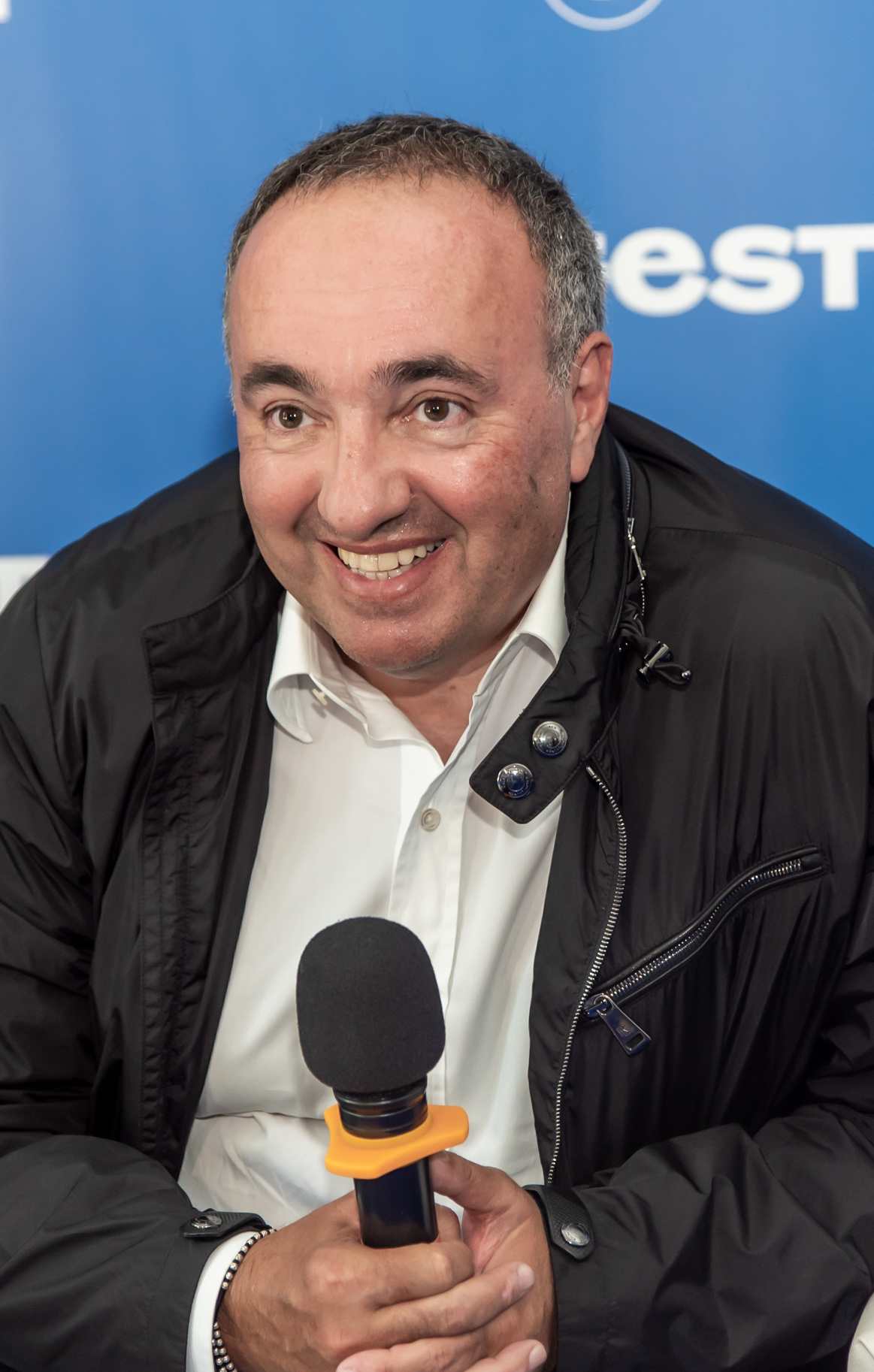
Alexander Rodnyansky

The history of the festival can be traced back to the Soviet era when in 1990 Mark Rudinstein organized his “Festival of Un-bought Cinema” in Podolsk, Moscow Region. It was an attempt to support national film production and distribution in the time of social, political and economic turmoil in the USSR when film financing (up until then provided by the state) was reduced and national distribution network had collapsed. In 1991 the festival got its nowadays name “Kinotavr” and was relocated to Sochi.

In 1994 it already consisted of two parts: the Open Russian Film Festival (ORFF) and the International Film Festival (IFF), registered with the International Federation of Associations of Film Producers (FIAPF).

In 2005 “Kinotavr” brand was bought by Alexander Rodnyansky, the management switched its focus onto national market and IFF part was stopped. Kinotavr now was aimed at becoming “a powerful mechanism in the development of a film industry” in Russia and then also continued to make "emphasis on international promotion of Russian product”.

That change also gave the festival permanent programmer Sitora Alieva an opportunity to "play down the rivalry between Kinotavr and the Moscow Film Festival, also held in June".

The last edition of the festival was held in 2021.

While preparing the upcoming 2022 edition, the president of the Kinotavr film festival, Alexander Rodnyansky, announced in March 2022 that the festival would not be held this year. According to the festival's president, "One cannot talk about festivals when Russia is waging an aggressive war".

In February 2023, the Ministry of Culture of the Russian Federation announced that the festival would not take place that year either.

In October 2023, the festival's website was taken offline. The festival's president, Alexander Rodnyansky, was declared a "foreign agent" by the Russian Ministry of Justice on October 21, 2022. According to the Russian film industry publication "Exhibitor's Bulletin", citing its own sources, the state "would not restore the Sochi film festival in its previous form". De facto, the festival has ceased to exist.

== Awards ==
- The Grand Prize
- Best Director
- Best Debut
- Best Actor
- Best Actress
- Best Screenplay is called the "Grigory Gorin Award for the Best Screenplay"
- Best Music is called the "Tariverdiev Prize for the Best Music"
- The prize of the contest "Kinotavr: Short Film"

Over the history the following prizes have also been awarded:

- The Grand Prize (Second Prize) for the second best entry
- Special Prize of the Jury
- "Diamond Rose" prize
- Prize of the Guild of Russian Film Producers, for the best producer's project
- Prize of the Guild of Russian Film Scholars and Film Critics
- Prize of the Festival's Presidential Council
- FIPRESCI Prize, by Fédération Internationale de la Presse Cinématographique (FIPRESCI)
- FIPRESCI Prize - Special Mention

== Winners ==
=== Grand Prize ===
- 1990 – Revenge, dir. Yermek Shinarbayev)
- 1991 – Sons of Bitches (Сукины дети, dir. Leonid Filatov)
- 1992 – The Sun of the Sleepless (Солнце неспящих, dir. Temur Babluani)
- 1993 – Encore, Once More Encore! (Анкор, ещё анкор!, dir. Pyotr Todorovsky)
- 1994 – Little Angel, Make Me Happy (Ангелочек, сделай радость, Angelochek sdelay radost, dir. Uzmaan Saparov)
- 1995 – Peculiarities of the National Hunt (Особенности национальной охоты, dir. Aleksandr Rogozhkin)
- 1996 – Prisoner of the Mountains (Кавказский пленник, dir. Sergei Bodrov)
- 1997 – Brother (Брат, dir. Aleksei Balabanov)
- 1998 – Time of the dancer (Время танцора, dir. Vadim Abdrashitov)
- 2000 – Luna Papa (Лунный папа, dir. Bakhtyar Khudojnazarov)
- 2001 – Tender Age (Нежный возраст, dir. Sergei Solovyov)
- 2002 – War (Война, dir. Aleksei Balabanov)
- 2003 – Old Women (Старухи, dir. Gennadi Sidorov)
- 2004 – A Driver for Vera (Водитель для Веры, dir. Pavel Chukhray)
- 2005 – Poor Relatives (Бедные родственники, dir. Pavel Lungin)
- 2006 – Playing the Victim (Изображая жертву, dir. Kirill Serebrennikov)
- 2007 – Simple Things (Простые вещи, dir. Alexei Popogrebski)
- 2008 – Pal/Secam (dir. Dmitry Povolotsky)
- 2009 – Wolfy (Волчок, dir. Vassily Sigarev)
- 2010 – Truce (Перемирие, dir. Svetlana Proskurina)
- 2011 – Indifference (Безразличие, dir. Oleg Flyangolts)
- 2012 – I Will By Your Side (Я буду рядом, dir. Pavel Ruminov)
- 2013 – The Geographer Drank His Globe Away (Географ глобус пропил, dir. Alexander Veledinsky)
- 2014 – Test (Испытание, dir. Alexander Kott)
- 2015 – About Love (Про любовь, dir. Anna Melikian)
- 2016 – The Good Boy (Хороший мальчик, dir. Oksana Karas)
- 2017 – Arrhythmia (Аритми́я, dir. Boris Khlebnikov)
- 2018 – Core of the World (Сердце мира, dir. Natalia Meshchaninova)
- 2019 – The Bull (Бык, dir. Boris Akopov)
- 2020 - Scarecrow (Пугало, dir. Dmitry Davydov)
- 2021 - Freeze Dance (Море волнуется раз, dir. Nikolay Khomeriki)
