= List of Russian films of 2021 =

This is a list of films produced in Russia in 2021 (see 2021 in film).

== Film releases ==
Opening		Title	Russian title	Cast and crew	Details
J A N U A R Y	1	The Last Warrior: Root of Evil	Последний богатырь: Корень зла	Director: Dmitriy Dyachenko; Cast: Viktor Khorinyak, Mila Sivatskaya, Ekaterina Vilkova, Elena Yakovleva, Sergey Burunov, Yelena Valyushkina, Kirill Zaytsev, Konstantin Lavronenko	Walt Disney Studios; Continuation of the 2017 film The Last Warrior (The Last Knight), a film company by The Walt Disney Company CIS.
J A N U A R Y	2	Silver Spoon. The Movie	Мажор. Фильм	Director: Nikolai Bulygin, Max Polinsky; Cast: Pavel Priluchny, Yevgeny Stychkin, Agnia Ditkovskyte, Darina Ervin, Daniil Vorobyov	Online cinema KinoPoisk HD; Film based on 2014 television series Silver Spoon.
J A N U A R Y	14	Don't Heal Me	Не лечи меня	Director: Mikhail Malinin; Cast: Ivan Yankovsky, Dmitry Nagiyev	
J A N U A R Y	27	A Siege Diary	Блокадный дневник	Director: Andrey Zaitsev; Cast: Olga Ozollapinya, Sergey Dreyden	
J A N U A R Y	28	Zoya	Зоя	Director: Maxim Brius, Leonid Plyaskin; Cast: Anastasia Mishina, Artyom Kuren, Darya Yurgens, Yevgeny Romantsov, Nikita Kologrivyy	
F E B R U A R Y	4	Has Anyone Seen My Girl?	Кто-нибудь видел мою девчонку?	Director: Angelina Nikonova; Cast: Anna Chipovskaya, Alexander Gorchilin, Viktoriya Isakova, Yuri Borisov	
F E B R U A R Y	4	Ginger's Tale	Огонек-Огниво	Director: Konstantin Shchekin; Voice cast: Natalya Tereshkova, Peter Kovrizhnyh, Sergey Burunov, Irina Yakovleva, Edgar Zapashny	Fairy tale musical film using traditional animation about a faithful girl's quest to save her friend from the powerful effects of an artifact.
F E B R U A R Y	6	The North Wind	Северный ветер	Cast & Director: Renata Litvinova; Cast: Anton Shagin, Sofya Ernst, Galina Tyunina	
F E B R U A R Y	11	Love	Love	Director: Igor Tverdokhlebov; Cast: Sergei Svetlakov, Timur Batrutdinov, Yan Tsapnik	
F E B R U A R Y	11	The Relatives	Родные	Director: Ilya Aksyonov; Cast: Sergey Burunov, Irina Pegova, Semyon Treskunov, Elizaveta Gyrdymova, Nikita Pavlenko, Katerina Bekker	
F E B R U A R Y	18	Upon the Magic Roads	Конёк-Горбунок	Director: Oleg Pogodin; Cast: Anton Shagin, Pavel Derevyanko, Paulina Andreeva, Mikhail Yefremov, Yan Tsapnik, Oleg Taktarov, Lyasan Utiasheva, Aleksandr Semchev	Sony Pictures Productions and Releasing (SPPR); The tale is based on the novel. The Humpbacked Horse (1941 film) and The Humpbacked Horse (1947 animated feature films)
F E B R U A R Y	23	Dad	Батя	Director: Dmitry Yefimovich; Cast: Vladimir Vdovichenkov, Andrey Andreev	
F E B R U A R Y	25	Scarecrow	Пугало	Director: Dmitry Davydov; Cast: Valentina Romanova-Chyskyyray	
M A R C H	4	Couple from the Future	Пара из будущего	Director: Aleksey Nuzhnyy; Cast: Sergey Burunov, Mariya Aronova, Denis Paramonov, Darya Konyzheva, Igor Tsaregorodtsev, Georgiy Tokaev, Mikhail Orlov, Serafima Krasnikova	Central Partnership / Studio TriTe
M A R C H	4	Have Fun, Vasya! Date in Bali	Гуляй, Вася! Свидание на Бали	Director: Roman Karimov; Cast: Lyubov Aksyonova, Boris Dergachev, Roman Kurtsyn, Sergey Abroskin, Svyatoslav Korolev	The sequel to the 2017 film Have Fun, Vasya!
M A R C H	4	Russian South	Рашн Юг	Director: Anton Fedotov; Cast: Stasya Miloslavskaya, Semyon Treskunov, Rinal Mukhametov, Aleksandr Metyolkin, Roman Madyanov, Eldar Kalimulin	Sony Pictures Productions and Releasing (SPPR)
M A R C H	4	White Snow	Белый снег	Director: Nikolay Khomeriki; Cast: Olga Lerman, Fyodor Dobronravov, Nadezhda Markina, Anna Ukolova	
M A R C H	11	The Nose or the Conspiracy of Mavericks	Нос, или Заговор «не таких»	Director: Andrey Khrzhanovskiy	Opera animation film by School-Studio "Shar" based on the work of playwright Gogol
M A R C H	11	The Ex	Бывшая	Director: Evgeniy Puzyrevskiy; Cast: Konstantin Beloshapka, Vera Kincheva, Sergey Dvoynikov	
M A R C H	18	A Dog Named Palma	Пальма	Director: Aleksandr Domogarov Jr. Cast: Viktor Dobronravov, Leonid Basov, Vladimir Ilyin, Valeriya Fedorovich, Evgeniya Dmitrieva	Central Partnership
M A R C H	18	Secret Magic Control Agency	Ганзель, Гретель и Агентство Магии	Director: Aleksey Tsitsilin; Voice cast: Valery Smekalov, Irina Obrezkova, Alexey Makretsky, Regina Shchukina, Ksenia Brzhezovskaya, Yulia Zorkina	Sony Pictures Productions and Releasing (SPPR) / Netflix; Animated film based on Hansel and Gretel

Opening		Title	Russian title	Cast and crew	Details
A P R I L	1	Major Grom: Plague Doctor	Майор Гром: Чумной Доктор	Director: Oleg Trofim; Cast: Tikhon Zhiznevsky, Oleg Chugunov, Lyubov Aksyonova, Aleksei Maklakov, Aleksandr Seteykin, Sergei Goroshko, Dmitry Chebotarev, Mikhail Evlanov	Walt Disney Studios / Netflix; Superhero film, a full-length adaptation of the Russian comic book series Major Grom
A P R I L	1	Masha	Маша	Director: Anastasiya Palchikova; Cast: Anna Chipovskaya, Maksim Sukhanov	
A P R I L	8	Persian Lessons	Уроки фарси	Director: Vadim Perelman; Cast: Nahuel Pérez Biscayart, Lars Eidinger, Leonie Benesch	
A P R I L	15	Chernobyl: Abyss	Чернобыль	Director: Danila Kozlovsky; Cast: Danila Kozlovsky, Oksana Akinshina, Filipp Avdeyev, Ravshana Kurkova	Central Partnership / Netflix; A film about the Chernobyl disaster.
A P R I L	15	Sheena 667	Sheena 667	Director: Grigoriy Dobrygin; Cast: Vladimir Svirskiy, Yulia Peresild, Jordan Frye	
A P R I L	26	The Little Warrior	Маленький воин	Director: Ilya Ermolov; Cast: Ilya Sigalov, Mariya Lobanova, Nikolai Shrayber	
A P R I L	29	V2. Escape from Hell	Девятаев	Director:Timur Bekmambetov; Cast: Pavel Priluchny, Thure Riefenstein, Patrick Joswig, Daria Zlatopolskaya	World War II film based on real events
M A Y	13	Tell Her	Скажи ей	Director: Aleksandr Molochnikov; Cast: Kay Aleks Getts, Artyom Bystrov, Svetlana Khodchenkova, Wolfgang Cerny	Walt Disney Studios
M A Y	19	Tourist	Турист	Director: Andrey Batov; Cast: Aleksey Shevchenkov, Alexandr Baranovsky, Vladimir Petrov, Yevgeny Terskikh	
J U N E	10	Archipelago	Архипелаг	Director: Aleksey Telnov; Cast: Dmitry Palamarchuk, Andrey Merzlikin, Marina Petrenko	Tells about the Russian-Swedish expedition to Svalbard in the 19th century.
J U N E	10	The Red Ghost	Красный призрак	Director: Andrey Bogatyrev; Cast: Aleksey Shevchenkov, Vladimir Gostyukhin, Yuri Borisov, Polina Chernyshova, Wolfgang Cerny, Mikhail Gorevoy	Ghost war film
J U N E	24	Bender: The Beginning	Бендер: Начало	Director: Igor Zaytsev; Cast: Sergey Bezrukov, Aram Vardevanyan, Nikita Kologrivyy	Film about Ostap Bender.

Opening		Title	Russian title	Cast and crew	Details
J U L Y	10	Compartment No. 6	Купе номер шесть	Director: Juho Kuosmanen; Cast: Seidi Haarla, Yuri Borisov, Dinara Drukarova	
J U L Y	15	Bender: Gold of the Empire – Part 2	Бендер: Золото империи	Director: Igor Zaytsev; Cast: Sergey Bezrukov, Aram Vardevanyan, Nikita Kologrivyy	Continuation of the film Bender: The Beginning.
S E P T E M B E R	1	Girls Got Game	Нефутбол	Director: Maksim Sveshnikov; Cast: Lyubov Aksyonova, Egor Koreshkov, Yuliya Topolnitskaya, Alina Alekseeva	Sports film about captain of a women's soccer team.
S E P T E M B E R	9	Heavenly Team	Небесная команда	Director: Vladimir Alenikov; Cast: Anton Rogachev, Kristina Korbut, Nikita Volkov, Aleksei Guskov, Irina Rozanova	
S E P T E M B E R	9	Fib the Truth	Соври мне правду	Director: Olga Akatieva; Cast: Darya Melnikova, Yevgeny Romantsov, Pavel Priluchny	
S E P T E M B E R	9	Mama, I'm Home	Мама, я дома	Director: Vladimir Bitokov; Cast: Kseniya Rappoport, Yuri Borisov, Alexander Gorchilin	
S E P T E M B E R	9	Petrov's Flu	Петровы в гриппе	Director: Kirill Serebrennikov; Cast: Chulpan Khamatova, Semyon Serzin, Elene Mushkaeva	Sony Pictures Productions and Releasing (SPPR); Adapted from the novel The Petrovs In and Around Flu by Russian author Alexey Sainikov
S E P T E M B E R	14	Quarantine	КАРАнтин	Director: Diana Ringo; Cast: Anatoly Bely, Aleksandr Obmanov, Diana Ringo	Dystopian drama film
S E P T E M B E R	21	The Danube	Дунай	Director: Lyubov Mulmenko; Cast: Nadezhda Lumpova, Nenad Vasic, Dusan Mamula	
S E P T E M B E R	23	100 Minutes	Иван Денисович	Director: Gleb Panfilov; Cast: Filipp Yankovsky, Artur Beschastny, Aleksandr Karavayev	Based on One Day in the Life of Ivan Denisovich.
S E P T E M B E R	23	House Arrest	Дело	Director: Aleksey German Jr. Cast: Merab Ninidze, Svetlana Khodchenkova	
S E P T E M B E R	23	Milk	Молоко	Director: Karen Oganesyan; Cast: Yulia Peresild, Andrey Burkovsky, Gosha Kutsenko	
S E P T E M B E R	25	Unclenching the Fists	Разжимая кулаки	Director: Kira Kovalenko; Cast: Milana Aguzarova, Alik Karaev, Soslan Khugaev	
S E P T E M B E R	26	Hostel	Общага	Director: Roman Vasyanov; Cast: Gennady Vyrypaev, Irina Starshenbaum, Marina Vasilyeva	

Opening		Title	Russian title	Cast and crew	Details
O C T O B E R	14	Gerda	Герда	Director: Natalya Kudryashova; Cast: Anastasiya Krasovskaya, Yuri Borisov	
O C T O B E R	21	Draculov	Дракулов	Director: Ilya Kulikov; Cast: Mikhail Galustyan, Denis Vasilev, Tatyana Babenkova, Aleksey Zolotovitskiy	
O C T O B E R	21	Saving Pushkin	Учёности плоды	Cast & Director: Igor Ugolnikov; Cast: Sergey Bezrukov, Nastassja Kerbengen, Fyodor Bondarchuk, Anastasiya Melnikova	
O C T O B E R	28	The Ice Demon	Ледяной демон	Director: Ivan Kapitonov; Cast: Olga Lomonosova, Aleksey Rozin, Alina Babak, Gleb Kalyuzhny, Igor Khripunov	
O C T O B E R	28	Koschey: The Everlasting Story	Кощей. Начало	Director: Andrey Kolpin; Voice cast: Nikita Volkov, Irina Starshenbaum, Timur Rodriguez, Arseny Perel, Pavel Barshak, Vladislav Vetrov, Irina Medvedeva, Miroslava Karpovich	Parovoz Animation Studio
N O V E M B E R	5	Bender: The Final Hustle – Part 3	Бендер: Последняя афера	Director: Igor Zaytsev; Cast: Sergey Bezrukov, Aram Vardevanyan, Taisiya Vilkova, Artyom Tkachenko, Olga Sutulova	In the future, the film will become part of the Bender series.
N O V E M B E R	11	Friend for Sale	Друг на продажу	Director: Aleksandr Danilov; Cast: Anton Pampushny, Anton Bogdanov, Vadim Galygin, Irina Antonenko, Mikhail Bashkatov	
N O V E M B E R	11	Row 19	Ряд 19	Director: Alexander Babaev; Cast: Svetlana Ivanova, Wolfgang Cerny, Marta Timofeeva, Ekaterina Vilkova	Central Partnership
N O V E M B E R	18	Sky	Небо	Director: Igor Kopylov; Cast: Igor Petrenko, Ivan Batarev, Sergey Gubanov, Maria Mironova, Marina Mitrofanova, Ilya Noskov	Central Partnership
N O V E M B E R	18	Teddy Boom	Плюшевый Бум!	Director: Denis Chernov; Voice cast: Mikhail Khrustalev, Ksenia Brzhezovskaya	The Riki Group of Companies
D E C E M B E R	2	At Close Distance	На близком расстоянии	Director: Grigoriy Dobrygin; Cast: Kseniya Rappoport, Nurbol Uulu Kayratbek, Petr Rykov	
D E C E M B E R	2	Only Me is Normal	Нормальный только я	Director: Anton Bogdanov; Cast: Anton Bogdanov, Olga Lerman, Maksim Vitorgan	
D E C E M B E R	2	The Pilot. A Battle for Survival	Лётчик	Director: Renat Davletyarov; Cast: Pyotr Fodorov, Anna Peskova, Pavel Osadchiy, Maksim Emelyanov, Yevgeny Mikheev, Gela Meskhi, Alexey Barabash	Central Partnership
D E C E M B E R	9	Freeze Dance	Море волнуется раз	Director: Nikolay Khomeriki; Cast: Olga Bodrova, Valery Stepanov	
D E C E M B E R	23	The Last Warrior: A Messenger of Darkness	Последний богатырь: Посланник тьмы	Director: Dmitry Dyachenko; Cast: Viktor Khorinyak, Mila Sivatskaya, Ekaterina Vilkova, Elena Yakovleva, Konstantin Lavronenko, Sergey Burunov, Yelena Valyushkina	Walt Disney Studios; It is a sequel to The Last Warrior: Root of Evil (2021) by The Walt Disney Company CIS.
D E C E M B E R	30	Champion of the World	Чемпион мира	Director: Aleksey Sidorov; Cast: Ivan Yankovsky, Konstantin Khabensky, Vladimir Vdovichenkov, Viktor Dobronravov, Viktor Sukhorukov, Diana Pozharskaya	Central Partnership; Based on real events. Sports drama, CIA intrigue/sabotage film.
D E C E M B E R	30	Three Heroes and The Horse on The Throne	Три богатыря и Конь на троне	Director: Darina Shmidt; Voice cast: Dmitry Vysotsky, Sergei Makovetsky	Melnitsa Animation Studio

=== Culturally Russian films ===
- I'm Not a Terrorist (Russian: Я - не террорист) is a 2021 Uzbek war film directed by Muhammad Ali Iskandarov.
- The King's Man is a 2021 British spy action film directed by Matthew Vaughn.
- Nobody is a 2021 American action thriller comedy film directed by Ilya Naishuller.
- Our Men is a 2021 French-Belgian drama film directed by Rachel Lang.

== See also ==
- 2021 in film
- 2021 in Russia
