= Finist. The First Warrior =

- Theatrical release poster
- Directed by: Dmitry Dyachenko
- Written by: Vitaly Shlyappo; Vasily Kutsenko; Anatoly Molchanov; Vyacheslav Zub
- Based on: The Feather of Finist the Falcon by Alexander Afanasyev
- Produced by: Mikhail Tkachenko; Sergey Mayevsky; Eduard Iloyan; Vitaly Shlyappo (ru); Denis Zhalinsky; Aleksey Trotsyuk; Anton Zlatopolsky (ru); Irina Vintovkina
- Starring: Kirill Zaytsev; Elena Yakovleva; Yulia Peresild; Fyodor Dobronravov; Sergey Lavygin (ru); Kristina Stroiteleva; Fyodor Gamaleya; Pavel Priluchny
- Cinematography: Nikolay Bogachyov
- Music by: George Kallis
- Production companies: Yellow, Black and White; Russia-1; START Studio; All Media A Start Company; Cinema Fund
- Distributed by: National Media Group Film Distribution
- Release dates: December 24, 2024 (Karo 11 October); January 1, 2025 (Russia)
- Running time: 112 minutes
- Country: Russia
- Language: Russian
- Budget: ₽1.2 billion
- Box office: ₽2.614 billion; $26.4 million (worldwide)

Finist. The First Warrior (Russian: Финист. Первый богатырь, lit. 'Finist. The First Bogatyr') is a 2024 Russian Slavic fantasy adventure film directed by Dmitry Dyachenko and produced by Yellow, Black and White. It is the fourth film in the franchise "The Last Warrior" and a prequel to the 2017's The Last Warrior (The Last Knight), as well as a spin-off of the series.

The plot of the film is based on Russian folk tales, a free continuation of the 1976 film Finist, the Brave Falcon. The film stars Kirill Zaytsev, as well as Elena Yakovleva, Yulia Peresild, Fyodor Dobronravov, Sergey Lavygin. Kristina Stroiteleva, Fyodor Gamaleya and others. The central character of the film is The Feather of Finist the Falcon. The film shows the path of becoming Baba Yaga, a healer and sorceress, forced to hide after the victory of the light forces over the dark ones. Part of the filming took place in Kazakhstan, the process lasted 23 shifts.

Finist. The First Warrior premiered at the Karo 11 October in Moscow on December 24, 2024. This film was theatrically released on January 1, 2025, by National Media Group Film Distribution.

== Premise ==
The film tells the story of the strongest, most agile and handsome hero of Belogorye named Finist. He must remain strong to continue to inspire admiration among people. And suddenly he sets off on a difficult journey to the East.

== Cast ==
- Kirill Zaytsev as Finist the Falcon, the bogatyr is a warrior
- Elena Yakovleva as Baba Yaga
  - Yulia Peresild as Young Baba Yaga, a rejuvenated witch
- Fyodor Dobronravov as Anarif, a brilliant inventor and alchemist
- Sergey Lavygin as Melekha, Finist's assistant, his right hand
- Kristina Stroiteleva as Princess Zlata, imprisoned in a tower
- Fyodor Gamaleya as a camel driver, Anarif's guards
- Pavel Priluchny as Jamal the talking camel (voice)
- Sophia Zayka as a peasant woman
- Maksim Kostromykin as a peasant
- Sergey Marukhin as a plump man, the bogatyr is a warrior
- Artyom Gaidukov as a red-haired man, the bogatyr is a warrior
- Nariman Utakaev as a genie
- Ivan Batarev as a bogatyr

== Production ==
After the 2022 Russian invasion of Ukraine, The Walt Disney Company CIS paused operations, and the co-producers of the Last Knight series, Yellow, Black and White, decided to make a prequel without permission from Disney.

The authors initially planned to spend 980 million rubles on the production of the film. They requested half of this amount from the Russian Cinema Fund.

=== Casting ===
Finist the Falcon, played by Kirill Zaytsev, was one of the key characters in the films The Last Warrior: Root of Evil (2021 film), The Last Warrior: A Messenger of Darkness (2021 film) and The Last Warrior: Offspring (2024 TV series).

=== Filming ===
Principal photography began in April 2023 in Moscow, Russia and took place in Kazakhstan.

Part of the filming took place in Kazakhstan, the process lasted 23 shifts. Among the filming locations were the Singing Dune, Charyn Canyon (the episode of Finist's flight from the cave), the city of Qonayev and Almaty (forests and mountains in the city's vicinity), national parks and steppes. One of the blocks was filmed in the scenery of the Nomad fortress, which was built in 2005 for the film Nomad.

== Reception ==
=== Box office ===
The film earned more than 1.6 billion rubles at the box office on January 6.

== See also ==
- The Last Warrior: Root of Evil (2021 film)
- The Last Warrior: A Messenger of Darkness (2021 film)
