= The Last Warrior =

The Last Warrior may refer to the films:

- The Last Warrior (1970 film), an American Western film directed by Carol Reed
- The Final Executioner (1984), an Italian post-apocalyptic film directed by Romolo Guerrieri, also known as The Last Warrior
- The Last Warrior (2000 film), an American action film directed by Sheldon Lettich
- The Last Warrior (2017 film), a Russian-American fantasy comedy film directed by Dmitry Dyachenko
- The Scythian (2018), a Russian action drama fantasy film directed by Rustam Mosafir, released as The Last Warrior in English-speaking markets
- The Last Warrior: Root of Evil (2021), a Russian fantasy comedy film directed by Dmitry Dyachenko, and sequel to his 2017 film, also known as The Last Warrior 2
- The Last Warrior: A Messenger of Darkness (2021), a Russian fantasy comedy film directed by Dmitry Dyachenko, and sequel to his earlier films, also known as The Last Warrior 3
