= The Last Warrior: Emissary of Darkness =

2021 Russian comedy fantasy film by Dmitry Dyachenko

- Theatrical release poster
- Directed by: Dmitry Dyachenko
- Written by: Vitaly Shlyappo; Dimitri Yan; Vasily Kutsenko; Pavel Danilov; Igor Tudvasev
- Based on: Russian: Bogatyr; English: Hero or Warrior
- Produced by: Kakhaber Abashidze; Eduard Iloyan; Vitaly Shlyappo; Denis Zhalinsky; Aleksandr Kushaev
- Starring: Viktor Khorinyak; Mila Sivatskaya; Ekaterina Vilkova; Elena Yakovleva; Konstantin Lavronenko; Sergey Burunov; Yelena Valyushkina; Garik Kharlamov; Timofey Tribuntsev
- Cinematography: Pavel Kapinos
- Music by: George Kallis
- Production companies: Walt Disney Pictures; The Walt Disney Company CIS; Yellow, Black and White
- Distributed by: Walt Disney Studios Motion Pictures CIS
- Release date: 23 December 2021
- Running time: 108 minutes
- Country: Russia
- Language: Russian English (dubbing)
- Budget: ₽454 million
- Box office: ₽2.196 billion; $27 million

The Last Warrior: Emissary of Darkness (Russian: Последний богатырь: Посланник тьмы, lit. 'The Last Bogatyr: A Messenger of Darkness'; also known as The Last Warrior 3) is a 2021 Russian fantasy comedy film, a sequel to The Last Warrior: Root of Evil (2021) and is the third and final installment in The Last Warrior series.

The film is directed by Dmitry Dyachenko and stars Viktor Khorinyak, Mila Sivatskaya, Ekaterina Vilkova, Elena Yakovleva, Konstantin Lavronenko, Sergey Burunov and Philipp Kirkorov.

It was theatrically released in Russian by Walt Disney Studios on 23 December 2021. The film was also shown in IMAX cinemas

As of 9 January 2022, the film became the 9th-highest-grossing local-language release of all time in Russia, surpassing The Last Warrior with 1.88 billion rubles ($25.5 million). In Russia, the film holds the 9th place biggest box-office audiences. This was Disney Russia's fourth and last film produced specifically for the Russian market, with the previous being The Book of Masters (2009), The Last Warrior (2017), and The Last Warrior: Root of Evil (2021). It is the most recent Disney film produced in Russia, as the company paused its business there in the wake of the 2022 Russian invasion of Ukraine.

== Plot ==
Ivan has finally gained heroic strength, the evil sorcerer Rogoleb has been defeated, and now all of Belogorye is preparing for a feast for the whole world: Ivan and Vasilisa are going to celebrate their wedding, solving problems typical for almost any newlywed couple. Koschey forges rings, Svetozar enlarges the butterflies - they will be released at the wedding instead of the pigeons eaten inappropriately by the hungry Kolobok, Baba Yaga conjures wings for the hut and invites the newlyweds to fly on it on their honeymoon. In the midst of preparations for the holiday, evil again reminds itself: Vasilisa is kidnapped, and in the heat of the chase, Ivan and his friends move to modern Moscow.

Once in the capital, the heroes of fairy tales, unfamiliar with the modern world, try, with the help of Ivan, to adapt to new conditions. In the heat of the chase for Galina through the city, Baba Yaga's hut is knocked down by Galina's envoy, a black knight, whose face is hidden under a helmet, as a result of which Koschey, who fell out of the hut, is separated from the group, whose head fell into a car passing along the road and rolled into a bag of groceries. and the body fell onto the deck of one of the ships sailing along the Moscow River. Kolobok is also on the ship with him, so he and Koshchei’s body have to work together to find the missing head and subsequently get to Ivan, who is depressed by the loss of his bride. It is impossible to target Vasilisa's trail without outside help - Galina is hiding in a certain space, into which there is no way to get through without using dark forces. The only clue turns out to be a firebird feather, which can help lead Ivan on the right path. Despite the fact that Koschey exterminated the firebirds in Belogorye long ago, some of the birds survived and, under the threat of the approaching darkness, left their world and moved to Moscow. Svetozar sends Ivan’s phone to Koshchei, turning the device into a bird. However, Kolobok swallows it, and the hero fails to contact Koshchei. Baba Yaga, Svetozar and Vodyanoy, in order not to arouse suspicion, leave the hut near one of the high-rise buildings and for the first time become acquainted with a curiosity - a Moscow taxi, quite frightening the taxi driver.

Having made their way into the building and bypassing the security post without any problems, the heroes enter the “firebird’s nest.” The firebirds, to Ivan’s surprise, turn out to be Philip Kirkorov and a group of dancers performing with him. Kirkorov has a rather bad attitude towards the proposals of the residents of Belogorye to help them: for him, the magical world has not been of interest for a long time, and his fate is completely indifferent to the bird. The firebird lays an egg - this happens only once in the bird's entire life, and the magic egg can give any answer to any question. Therefore, the hero, after waiting a moment, decides to steal the egg while the birds are busy eating grain, which turns them into people during the concerts. The merman also asks to try the magic grain. Taking advantage of the commotion caused by Vodyany’s transformation into a human, the hero takes the egg with him and goes to his home. Meanwhile, a woman takes Koshchei’s head in a bag of groceries to her home, and her little son mistakes Koshchei’s head for a new toy. Koshchei’s body, along with Kolobok, who works as his navigator, is also not sitting still, and therefore, to speed up the search for the missing part of the body, the couple steals a bike and rides around the city.

Koschey and Kolobok find the head without much difficulty: the owner of the apartment, who does not approve of the strange “Chinese toys” bought by her husband for her son, is going to throw the head in the trash can, but in the yard she meets the heroes of the fairy-tale world. Having taken their heads, Koschey and Kolobok go searching for Ivan around the city, without being able to contact him.

At the same time, Vasilisa is being held captive by Galina. Confident that she will definitely be saved, she diligently resists and tries to leave the enchanted place. But despite all attempts, this does not bring any success. Galina shocks Vasilisa with the news: the one Vanya is trying to fight against is actually his mother, and everything she does is just her way to reunite with her son. Having received a drop of blood from Vasilisa’s lips, Galina takes on her appearance and goes after Ivan and his friends.

The firebird egg cannot be opened so easily: under no circumstances is it exposed to external influences, and even a treasure sword, known for its powers, is not able to cut it in half. The only clue is that the egg shows the same inscription: “Open tomorrow.” However, Ivan faces a problem here too: the clock is 00:00 the next day, but the firebird’s egg still does not allow itself to be cracked, and the inscription “I will open tomorrow” does not disappear: after all, the “tomorrow” that has come is already “today”. Yagi’s aging potion also doesn’t have any effect: the egg stubbornly asks to be opened only when “tomorrow” comes. In sadness, Ivan, wanting to be alone, drives his car around the city. Koschey and Ivan almost collide on the road, but never notice each other.

The next morning, Ivan, who had dozed off in the car, is abruptly pulled out by the knight who has kidnapped Vasilisa and knocked down the hut. The knight and the hero enter into a fierce battle. Neither blows from a road sign, nor a truck, which the knight gets under in the heat of battle, can stop him, and the only thing that allows Ivan to leave alive is a lucky chance: the beaten hero leaves on the trailer of a tow truck, where his enemy threw him.

Ivan returns home. Vodyanoy offers a new solution: find a kikimore. The kikimors, once expelled from Belogorye, devoured human time, and despite the fact that they had long been prohibited from doing this, they found a way to secretly steal it for food in another world. To preserve food supplies, the kikimoras created a “time stone” - a crystal capable of storing time and transporting its owner both to the past and to the future. One of the places where they live turns out to be a branch of the Russian Post, which Ivan visits along with Vodyany, Yaga and Svetozar. Kolobok, inside of which the swallowed smartphone begins to ring, has to spit it out, and Ivan, after a long time, still manages to call Koshchei and Kolobok, giving them the address of the post office.

The kikimors, hiding under the guise of postal employees, anger Ivan with their boorish behavior and bureaucratic rules and, causing him irresistible rage and anger, force the hero to destroy everything inside the department. Frightened by Ivan's power, the kikimors themselves take him to the crystal, but ask him to come to his senses and not deprive them of food, because, despite their attitude towards people and the theft of time, they did not take it away from them completely - literally a handful of what they were given was enough for them waiting at the post office. The hero, driven by the desire to save Vasilisa, does not listen to them and removes the crystal, thereby destroying the space in which the kikimors lived and depriving them of the food accumulated over a hundred years. Meanwhile, Galina, hiding behind the guise of Vasilisa, appears at the post office building and deceives Svetozar to take her home.

Before they can use the time stone, Vodyanoy, Ivan and Baba Yaga encounter the firebirds, who are very offended by the theft of the egg. The birds are ready to incinerate everyone, but Koschey arrives to the rescue in time and drives the birds away. By connecting the stone and the treasure sword, he helps create a portal to “tomorrow”, and Ivan, stretching his hand into it, opens the egg. Ivan first asks the question of where to find Vasilisa. The egg helps and immediately gives a guide. Trying to keep up with Galina, the hero suffers failure after failure until the hut grows wings at the most opportune moment, thanks to which Ivan and the others manage to break through the portal created by Galina. Galina completely closes all the doors to the hut, but Ivan still manages to get to Vasilisa.

At the moment when victory seems to be already in hand, Galina, having planned everything in advance, carries out her plan: the first thing she does, in front of her son, is kill the bound Vasilisa, piercing her through with a dagger. In grief and anger, the hero is eager to kill the scoundrel, but even here he makes a mistake - in a fit of rage, without hesitation, he kills Svetozar, to whom Galina temporarily gave her appearance, with his own hand. Driven to extreme hatred, rage and darkness in his soul, Ivan raises his sword to kill Galina, but the villainess tells Ivan the main news: she is his mother, and all this time she allowed events to go so that Ivan, with his own hands, awakens the darkness in himself. Darkness chose Ivan from his very birth, and only the boy’s separation from his mother did not allow his plans to be realized. His mother found Ivan in another world and nurtured the darkness in his soul, allowing him to be filled with it year after year. Only recent events and his journey to Belogorye began to awaken the light inside Ivan, forcing the hero to resist the darkness. Galina realized that decisive action was needed, so she stole Vasilisa. From that moment on, the hero was devoid of doubts and completely ready for anything: he was where his mother wanted him and did what was needed. By stealing the egg and destroying it, he doomed the firebird to eternal suffering, because the firebird could only have a child once in its life. Ivan brought destruction and hunger to the Kikimoras, depriving them of their home and the opportunity to live. All that was left was to fill Ivan with malice and anger so that he would cross the line and kill a man. From this moment on, Ivan begins to be consumed by darkness.

Having got out of the hut, Yaga, Vodyanoy and Koschey find Vasilisa. Having determined that there is still life in her, Yaga gives her a couple of drops of “living water” and revives the girl, curing her from her wound. Vasilisa, realizing what his mother is trying to do to Ivan, runs to him and tries to convince him that there is still light in him and he is able to overcome the darkness. In an attempt to protect Ivan, Vodyanoy and Yaga try with all their might to stop Galina, but fail: Vodyanoy is the first to die, pierced through by a spear thrown at him. Out of grief, Baba Yaga tries to use all her strength, but Galina easily turns the old sorceress to dust. The last chance to fix everything is Koshchei’s request: remembering his choice made a thousand years ago and how he let darkness into himself, the Immortal asks Ivan to fix everything before the coming of Darkness into the world began. For Koshchei, this becomes a chance to atone for everything that he has managed to do over many centuries, because it is through his fault that Belogorye suffers and it is through his fault that the darkness has gained its strength. And this chance will allow Koschey to live a real, happy, albeit not eternal, life. By creating a portal to the past, Koschey gives Ivan the opportunity to go there - there will be no turning back for him. In the last seconds before going into the past, Ivan sees how Galina turns Vasilisa to dust.

Having gone back in time, Ivan, on the shores of the Black Lake, encounters Mikula (the future Koshchei) seconds before he comes into contact with the darkness. The dialogue begins as quickly as it ends: the Messenger of Darkness appears out of nowhere and immediately attacks. In the battle, the knight reveals his true identity: the Messenger of Darkness is Ivan. From childhood, the Messenger was with him: pride, fear, rage - all these qualities were side by side with Ivan, and the Messenger cannot be killed, because the Messenger is himself. Therefore, Ivan acts differently: realizing that the Messenger cannot harm him, since he sits in his head, the hero simply controls his thoughts, thereby not allowing his dark essence to take over him. The last argument of the alter ego is that with the change in the flow of time, Ivan himself and the life in which he can see Vasilisa will not appear. The hero, who accepted this, does not regret anything and, having kicked the Messenger into the lake, drives out the darkness from himself. In the last minutes, Ivan asks Mikula not to allow darkness into herself and not to plot meanness against Belogor. Smiling, the hero convinces the guy that he will find his happiness and shakes his hand goodbye. The treasure sword will no longer return Ivan to the future, so the hero decides to do his last thing: he plunges the sword into the waters of the lake and thereby destroys the darkness forever.

It is unknown whether old Ivan has disappeared from the new world, but at the end of the film in Belogorye, Ilya Muromets, Dobrynya Nikitich and Alyosha Popovich are alive and maintain a strong friendship; Vodyanoy and Baba Yaga live together; Mikula lived to a gray old age and still helps Belogor; and Vasilisa is an ordinary girl, living happily with Ivan Muromets, the son of Galina and Ilya, who have not encountered darkness and suffering and together admire the happiness of the children.

== Cast ==
- Viktor Khorinyak as Ivan Ilyich Muromets / Ivan Ilyich Naydenov
- Mila Sivatskaya as Vasilisa the Wise
- Elena Yakovleva as Baba Yaga
- Konstantin Lavronenko as Koschei
- Sergey Burunov as Vodyanoy, a merman
- Yelena Valyushkina as Galina, Ivan Ilyich Muromets's mother
- Garik Kharlamov as Kolobok (voice)
- Timofey Tribuntsev as the white mage Svetozar
- Philipp Kirkorov as The Firebird (in human form)
- Anna Gulyarenko as Kikimora
- Anna Yakunina as Kikimora
- Yuriy Tsurilo as Ilya Muromets, the bogatyr and Ivan Ilyich Muromets's father
- Yevgeny Dyatlov as Dobrynya Nikitich, the bogatyr
- Wolfgang Cerny as Alyosha Popovich, the bogatyr

== Production ==
=== Filming ===
Principal photography took place simultaneously with the filming of the previous part, entitled The Last Warrior: Root of Evil. The work was carried out in the city of Sochi, in the Republic of Karelia, and in the Perm Krai, as well as in Moscow and the Moscow Oblast, where a whole small town was rebuilt especially for filming - with a palace, trading rows and log cabins.

== Reception ==
=== Box office ===
Having been released at the same time as the film Spider-Man: No Way Home, and A Messenger of Darkness collected 498 million rubles at the box office in eight days. By 3 January 2022 the film's box office receipts reached one billion rubles.

== Sequels ==
Despite the fact that the third part completes the story, the series "The Last Warrior: Offspring" should have been released in 2024, which would have continued the story of the trilogy. "Finist. The First Warrior", which is a prequel to the franchise, was released in 2025.
