= Klim (TV series) =

- Клим
- Genre: Psychological crime drama
- Created by: Karen Oganesyan
- Based on: Luther by Neil Cross
- Starring: Konstantin Lavronenko; Yevgeniy Doryakov
- Country of origin: Russia
- Original language: Russian
- No. of series: 1
- No. of episodes: 8

Production
- Producers: Alexander Tsekalo; Ruslan Sorokin
- Running time: 60 minutes
- Production company: Sreda

Original release
- Network: Channel One Russia
- Release: 31 January 2016

Related
- Less Than Evil (South Korea)

Klim (Russian: Клим) is a Russian psychological crime drama television series starring Konstantin Lavronenko as the title character, Detective Chief Inspector Klim, who works in Saint Petersburg, Russia. The series is a direct remake of the BBC TV series Luther.

The show is produced by Sreda for broadcast on Channel One Russia. Shooting began in Moscow in August 2014, and the first episode aired January 2016.

== Plot ==
Klim is a Detective Chief Inspector working for the Serious Crime Unit in Saint Petersburg Police. A dedicated police officer, Klim is obsessive, possessed, and sometimes dangerous in the violence of his fixations.

However, he has paid a heavy price for his dedication; he has never been able to prevent himself from being consumed by the darkness of the crimes with which he deals. For him, the job always comes first. His dedication is a curse and a blessing, both for him and those close to him.

== Actors ==
Konstantin Lavronenko, Daria Mingazetdinova, Anna Vartanyan, Sergey Shnyrev, Pavel Chinarev, Tatyana Kolganova, Sergey Kudryavtsev, Oleg Ryazantsev, Ivan Nikolaev (II), Vitaly Kovalenko, Nikita Panfilov, Anton Bagrov, Oleg Fedorov, Alexey Fokin, Svetlana Tsvichenko, Rina Grishina, Marina Heystonen, Denis Starkov, Vladimir Chernyshov, Grigory Chaban, Alexander Bolshakov, Alyona Bondarchuk (II), Alexander Zavyalov, Svetlana Kireeva, Alexander Udalov, Natalia Vinogradova, Evgeny Dobryakov, Valeria Kozhevnikova and others.

== Awards ==
2017 – Golden Eagle Award

- Best Miniseries
- Best Actor on TV (Konstantin Lavronenko)

2017 – APKIT Awards

- Best Cinematographer (Ulugbek Khamraev)

The series even received three APKIT Awards nominations in 2017, including nominations for «Best Actor in a TV Movie/Series» (Konstantin Lavronenko), «Best Supporting Actress in a TV Movie/Series» (Daria Mingazetdinova) and «Best Television Mini-Series (5-24 Episodes)» (Aleksandr Tsekalo, Ivan Samokhvalov, Karen Oganesyan).

== See also ==
- Luther (TV series), original series
