= Jigalova Marina =

Russian businesswoman

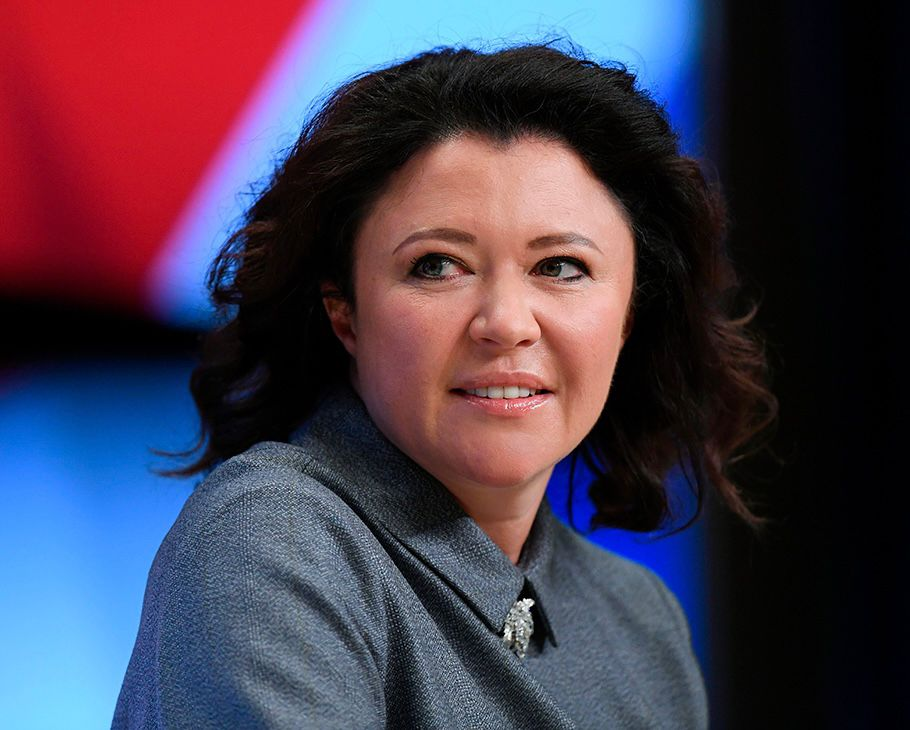
- Born: May 11, 1971 (age 53)
- Education: Harvard Business School (MBA)
- Known for: founder and CEO of Disney in CIS, Georgia, and Mongolia

Marina Alexandrovna Jigalova (born May 11, 1971) is an international investor and entrepreneur, founder and CEO of Disney in CIS, Georgia, and Mongolia from 2006 to 2019.

== Early life and education ==
Jigalova (alternative spelling: Zhigalova) was born in Moscow, USSR, on May 11, 1971, to a family of employees of the foreign trade departments of the USSR.

In 1994 Jigalova graduated from the Moscow State Institute of International Relations (MGIMO) and earned a degree in International Commerce and Law.

While working at the International Business School (1991–1994), she studied at the Economic Development Institute by the World Bank in Washington. Jigalova received her MBA in 2001 from Harvard Business School. She also graduated from the Higher Courses for Scriptwriters and Directors.

== Career ==
=== 1991–2006 ===
In the period from 1991 to 2006, Jigalova held a number of management positions. Her early career was at the MGIMO School of International Business. In 1994, Jigalova was hired by the European Bank for Reconstruction and Development and worked in Moscow and London. From 1996 to 2006 Jigalova held various top management positions in financial and industrial corporations.

=== Disney ===
In April 2006, Jigalova Marina became the head of The Walt Disney Company in Moscow that is responsible for business development in CIS, Georgia, Mongolia (11 countries in total).

Later that year at Jigalova`s initiative, Disney and Sony Pictures launched a joint film distribution company Walt Disney Studios Sony Pictures Releasing (WDSSPR). She created a dubbing division at Disney which translated and dubbed into regional languages cinema and television films, series, commercials, marketing materials, games, and books.

In 2010 Marina initiated the launch of the Disney cable TV channel broadcasting. It has helped to start the production of television programs, films and series under the Disney brand. The Disney Moscow office became the first regional office that started the locally produced Disney branded films. Disney CIS released 145 films that were watched by more than 291 million people. Later, as a part of her initiative, the direction of licensing consumer goods was launched in the company.

In 2015 Jigalova brought Disney concert shows to the CIS countries, Georgia, Mongolia, as well as theater productions of Broadway musicals: “Beauty and the Beast”, “The Little Mermaid” and “Aladdin”. At Marina’s initiative, the Disney digital radio was launched, as well as the Disney family entertainment portal.

In 2016, Jigalova initiated the opening of the first cinema halls in CIS specially adapted for people with autism spectrum disorders.

In 2017, she became the producer of the film “The Last Warrior” that became one of the highest-grossing locally produced Disney branded films in the history of distribution, having collected more than 1.7 billion rubles.

In 2018, she received the Golden Eagle Award for the film "Matter" (Russian: Материя) in the nomination "Best Short Film".

=== Independent Media ===
In 2016, Jigalova joined Independent Media as a shareholder. From September 2020 till September 2022, she was holding the role of the managing shareholder. Under Marina’s leadership at the end of 2020, Independent Media entered the top five content media holdings in Russia in terms of monthly Internet audience (according to SimilarWeb).
