= I Don't Want to Be an Adult =

- Russian: Не хочу быть взрослым
- Directed by: Yuri Chulyukin
- Written by: Yuriy Chulyukin; Georgi Kushnirenko
- Starring: Kirill Golovko-Sersky; Natalya Varley; Yevgeny Steblov; Yevgenya Melnikova; Yelena Valyushkina
- Cinematography: Valentin Makarov; Valeri Vladimirov
- Edited by: Margarita Shadrina
- Music by: Gennady Gladkov; Igor Kantyukov
- Release date: 1982
- Running time: 77 minute
- Country: Soviet Union
- Language: Russian

I Don't Want to Be an Adult (Russian: Не хочу быть взрослым) is a 1982 Soviet children's comedy film directed by Yuri Chulyukin.

The film follows young Pavlik, whose parents push him to read and study intensively, as he visits his grandmother in a village, receives permission to explore on his own, and decides to venture into Moscow.

== Plot ==
A family from Petropavlovsk-Kamchatsky—father, mother, and their six-year-old son Pavlik—visits Pavlik’s grandmother in a village near Moscow. The grandmother and other villagers are shocked by Pavlik’s upbringing: he is exceptionally knowledgeable, thanks to his father, and very physically fit, due to his mother’s efforts. Upon learning of Pavlik’s strict schedule, his sympathetic grandmother allows him some freedom. Wanting a break from his parents, Pavlik takes a bus to Moscow, where he meets Sveta, a young woman who temporarily takes care of him until his parents can be located, and he quickly grows attached to her. Pavlik later escapes from the children’s room at the police station where Sveta had taken him, follows her to the Ostankino television center, and accidentally becomes the star of a live children’s broadcast. His parents see the broadcast, realize where he is, and rush to Moscow.

Upon reaching the TV center, Pavlik’s parents learn that Sveta has taken him. Needing to go to swim practice, Sveta entrusts Pavlik to her friend Marina for a few hours, but Pavlik cleverly escapes through a window. Overhearing a conversation among policemen, he sneaks into their vehicle and arrives at the pool, reuniting with Sveta, who invites him to her birthday party that evening. Sveta informs the police that Pavlik is with her, and the officers locate his frantic parents to inform them of his whereabouts. Everyone reunites at Sveta’s birthday celebration, where Pavlik, in front of the gathered guests, declares that he wants to be an ordinary boy, not an intellectual prodigy or athlete, and that he simply “doesn’t want to be an adult.”

== Cast ==
- Kirill Golovko-Sersky as Pavlik
- Natalya Varley as Katya
- Yevgeny Steblov as Dima
- Yevgenya Melnikova as Varvara Petrovna
- Yelena Valyushkina as Sveta
- Vladimir Zaitsev as Andrey Nikitin
- Lyudmila Chulyukina as Galya
- Vladimir Dudin as Yur Yurich
- Yanina Lisovskaya as Marina
- Pavel Vinnik as Vasily Sergeyevich
