= Natalya Varley =

Soviet and Russian actress

- Наталья Варлей
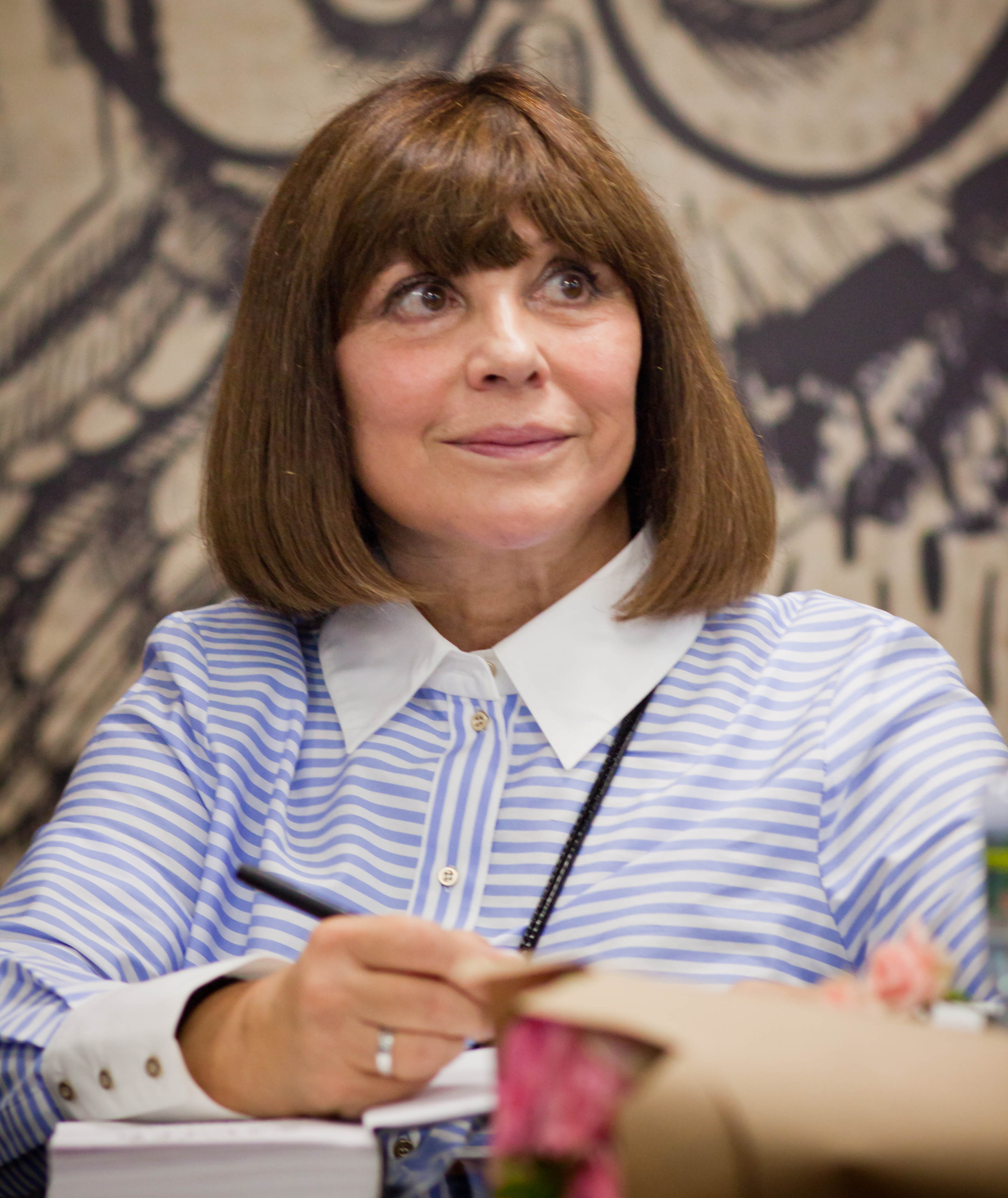
- Varley in 2018
- Born: Natalya Vladimirovna Varley; 22 June 1947 (age 79); Constanța, Romania
- Years active: 1966–present

Natalya Varley (Russian: Наталья Владимировна Варлей, born 22 June 1947) is a Soviet and Russian film and theater actress, who became famous in 1966 for her part in the comedy Kidnapping, Caucasian Style. In 1989 she was designated as a Meritorious Artist of RSFSR.

== Biography ==
Natalya Varley was born in Constanţa, Romania, a daughter of the sea captain Vladimir Viktorovich Varley, who was also a one-time City Council chairman (Mayor, in modern terms) of Murmansk where the family lived. One of his 19th century paternal ancestors was a Welsh jockey who (along with his brother) had been invited to Russia to manage a horse-breeding factory, married a Russian and settled there. Natalya's mother, Ariadna Sergeyevna Varley (née Senyavina), a granddaughter of geologist Yevgeny Barbot de Marni, was of French and German origins, a distant relative to Alexey K. Tolstoy.

As an artistic child she started writing poetry at the age of four, and was fond of painting and studied music. In the late 1950s, as the family settled in Moscow, she entered the Tsvetnoy Boulevard Circus's Children Studio and made quick progress there, which was all the more impressive, considering she'd been a sickly child and suffered from rheumatism-related heart disorder, which for several years prevented her from taking part in sports at school. After graduating the State Circus and Entertainment Art college in 1965, Varley joined the Moscow Tsvetnoy Boulevard Circus troupe as an equilibrist.

=== Career ===
In 1965, in Odessa where the troupe was on tour, Varley met Soviet clown and film actor Leonid Yengibarov. He proved to be a kindred spirit and became a close friend, as well as occasional stage partner. Once Yengibarov invited the film director Georgy Yungwald-Khilkevich to watch their performance. Stricken by Varley's stage persona, the latter invited her for a minor role to his latest movie, The Formula of Rainbow. During the filming Varley was spotted by the assistant of another film director, Leonid Gaidai, who invited her to the auditions for his new project, Kidnapping, Caucasian Style.

Amongst some 500 contenders there were celebrities like Natalya Fateyeva and Anastasiya Vertinskaya, but the director chose the 19-year-old amateur for the leading role. According to Gaidai, Varley has won him with her ingénue charms, but she later opined that one particular episode might have proved to be the decisive one.

...So I came to Mosfilm, read a script fragment and did the donkey scene. Then Gaidai asks me, somewhat diffidently: 'And now, Natasha, could I ask you perhaps to undress - down to a swimming suit?' 'Sure', I said, and did. Everybody just went: 'Aahh!' It is now that for actresses undressing is business-as-usual. In those years the Soviet cinema, as well as the Soviet people, were so much more shy. But for me the swimming-suit was a kind of circus uniform, I got used to it. So we shoot the episode with a swimming-suit, and I think it was the one that made all the difference.

Natalya and her heroine Nina were complete opposites. "She was supposed to be self-assured, cheeky and optimistic. Whereas I've always been rather quiet, dreamy and romantic. So Gaidai had to re-mold me almost literally during the shooting, into a true "Komsomolka, sportsmenka and an all-round looker," she later reminisced.

External videos
- Bears' Song, by Aida Vedishcheva / Natalya Varley.

Kidnapping, Caucasian Style, which premiered on 1 April 1967, became a huge success and Varley found herself an overnight superstar. Hugely popular was "The White Bears' Song", recorded for the film by Aida Vedishcheva. Varley's speaking voice was over-dubbed too, by Nadezhda Rumyantseva. Years later, when Varley embarked upon successful musical career (to often perform the famous song very close to the original) and herself became a well-known voiceover artist, doubts as to the wisdom of such a move were raised. "Gaidai grossly mistreated Varley by stripping her of her own voice. Natasha would have done exactly the same [as Vedishcheva and Rumayntseva did], except that maybe less forcefully," fellow actress and Gaidai's wife Nina Grebeshkova (cast in the film as a psychiatry ward doctor) later opined.

Varley found herself in the focus of media attention; crowds of fans started to gather wherever she would arrive to perform with her Circus troupe. This sudden fame made her none the richer: Varley claims to have been paid 300 rubles (two average Soviet monthly wages) for the blockbuster the popularity of which never waned.

In October 1967 the first Soviet horror movie, Viy (after Nikolay Gogol's novella of the same title) was premiered. Here Varley provided another striking performance, now as Pannochka, a murdered witch, rising off her coffin to torment and finally kill a hapless seminary student (played by Leonid Kuravlyov), who had inadvertently brought about her death. Several other films of the late 1960s featured Natalya Varley, who has by now left the Moscow Circus to become a Boris Shchukin Theatre Institute student. Among them were Seven Brides of Corporal Zbruyev and The Twelve Chairs, the latter again by Gaidai.

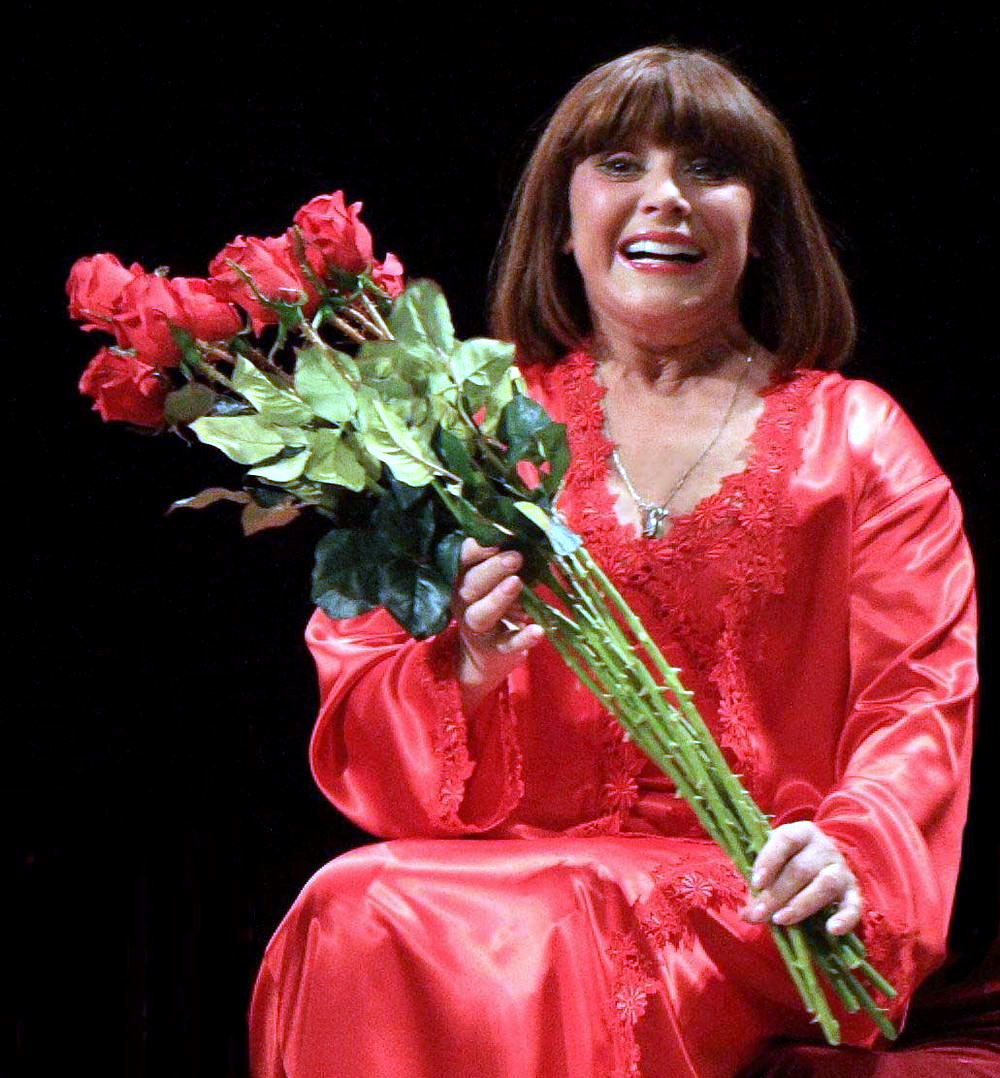
Varley on stage in Severodvinsk, 2010

In 1971 Varley graduated the Theatre Institute and joined the Moscow Drama Stanislavsky Theatre troupe where she worked till 1978. This was not a happy experience. Four directors came and went in the course of seven years; a long vacation had to be taken due to pregnancy (in 1972 she gave birth to her first son Vladimir) and the general atmosphere of jealousy, ill-will and petty intrigue proved to be utterly depressing for Varley.

Varley continued to be filmed throughout the 1980s, but despite some minor successes (The Great Attraction, My Father Is an Idealist, I Don't Want to Be an Adult) her career in cinema was ostensibly in decline. In the mid-1990s (after The Wizard of the Emerald City, 1994, where she played both of the two wicked witches) Varley retired, explaining this decision with her dissatisfaction with the dire quality of the scripts she'd been offered.

Prior to that, in the late 1980s Varley joined the Maxim Gorky Literature Institute which she graduated in 1994. Some of the poetry she'd written through the years became song lyrics. Working with the composer Nikolai Shershen, she released four studio albums in 1992-1999: At the Peak of Togetherness, Don't Die, Love, Aqua Vitae and The String in Me, Don't Break. She also authored three books of poetry.

In the 2000s Natalya Varley occasionally performed (the production of Oskar by the Empire of Stars, a private theatre) and gave solo concerts. She also hosted a couple of TV shows ("Household Affairs", Domashnye khlopoty; Your Business, Delo vashe). In 2009 she took part in the Russian Channel One "Two Stars" project, to perform in tandem with Ukrainian pop veteran Nikolai Gnatyuk.

=== Activism ===
From the early 1990s Natalya Varley was a Communist Party supporter who openly voiced her dissatisfaction with Boris Yeltsin's policies. She joined the so-called "Moral Revival" committee and backed Gennady Zyuganov's 1996 election campaign.

A devout Christian, Varley took part in several public actions of protest against what she saw as the 'satanic tendencies' in the democratic Russia's cinema and modern art where scandalous 'performances' became the norm, like that of Avdey Ter-Oganyan who infamously destroyed icons with an axe in the Moscow Manege. Alongside Nikita Mikhalkov she became highly popular with the Russian Orthodox media.

In 2010, Varley joined the United Russia party. In 2013, she was one of the organizers of the 20th anniversary event commemorating the victims of the 3–4 October 1993 events.

For "statements contradicting the interests of our national security" she was banned from entering Ukraine.

== Private life ==
In 1967 Natalya Varley married actor Nikolay Burlyaev, to a dismay of her circle of friends who tried to put it to her how passionately her fellow student Leonid Filatov was in love with her. The marriage proved to be an unhappy one and lasted less than a year. Her second husband was actor Vladimir Tikhonov, son of Vyacheslav Tikhonov and Nonna Mordyukova. In January 1972 Natalya gave birth to her first son, Vasily, but that was after the couple divorced. In 1990 Vladimir Tikhonov, long history of alcohol and drug abuse behind him, died of heart failure. Her second son, Alexander was born in 1986; the identity of his father remained unknown to the media. In 1999 Varley married for the third time ("His name is Vladimir and he is definitely not an actor," was as much as she told the press), but again this marriage proved to be short-lived.

== Select filmography ==
- Kidnapping, Caucasian Style (1966) as Nina
- Viy (1967) as Pannochka
- The Seven Brides of Lance-Corporal Zbruyev (1970) as Galina
- The Twelve Chairs (1971) as Liza
- Circus in the Circus (1974) as Tana
- Errors of Youth (1978) as Zina
- I Don't Want to Be an Adult (1982) as Katya
- Guest from the Future (1985) as Marta Erastovna
- The Wizard of Emerald City (1994 film) as Bastinda/Gingema
