= Mila Syvatska =

Ukrainian actress

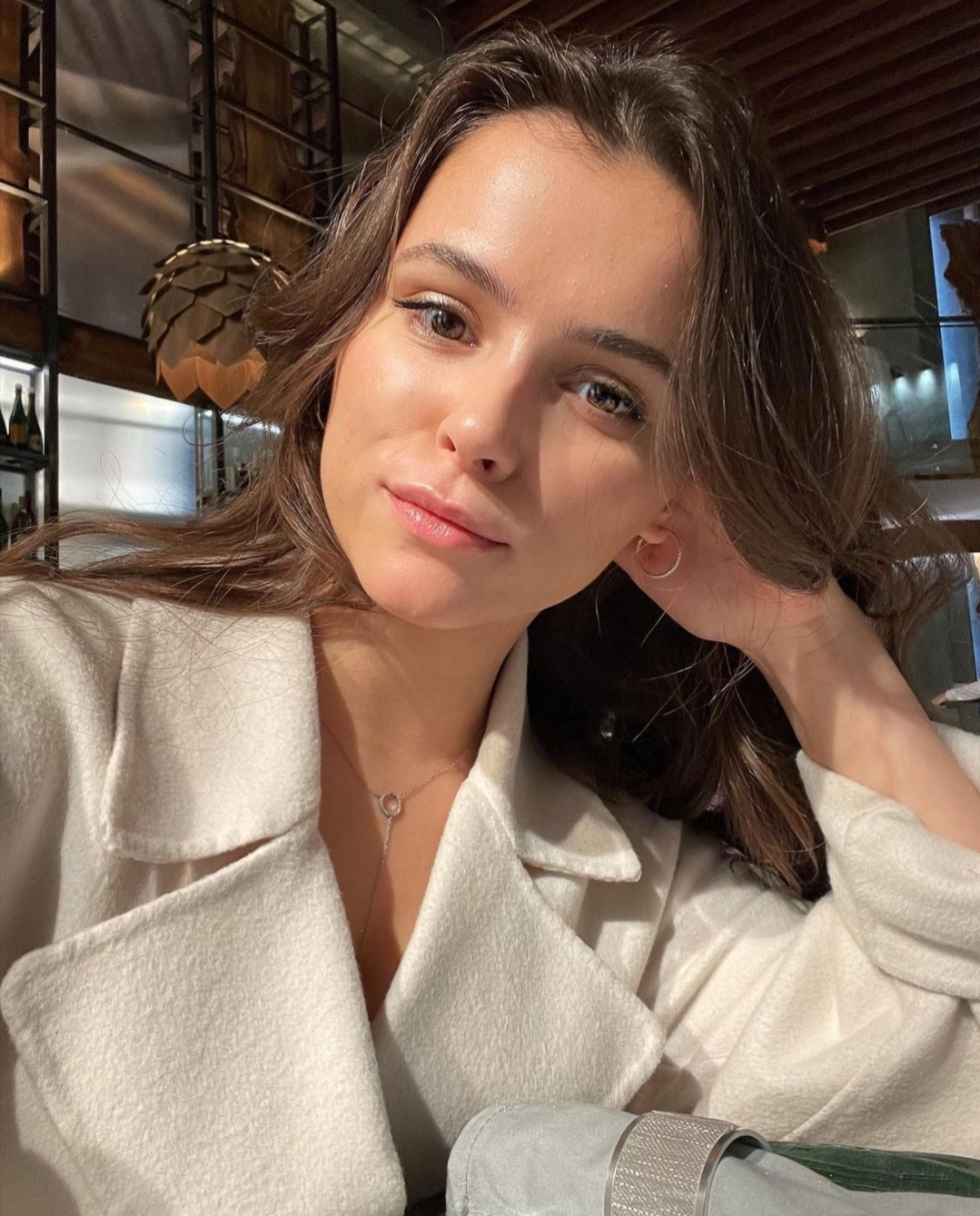
- Syvatska in 2021
- Born: Lyudmyla Oleksiivna Syvatska; 3 December 1998 (age 26); Kyiv, Ukraine
- Occupation: Actress
- Years active: 2008–present
- Height: 163 cm (5 ft 4 in)
- Parent(s): Oleksiy Syvatsky; Oksana Syvatska

Mila Oleksiivna Syvatska (Ukrainian: Міла Олексіївна Сивацька; born December 3, 1998, Kyiv, Ukraine) is a Ukrainian film actress, known for her role as Vasilisa in the Russian fantasy trilogy Last Knight.

== Biography ==
As a child, she took up dancing. In 2011, she participated in the Ukrainian national selection for the Junior Eurovision Song Contest as part of the girls band. In 2012, she took part in the Ukrainian contest Voice: Children. She worked as a photo model, featuring on the covers of children's magazines and catalogs. She was a presenter on UA:First. She has been acting in films since the age of ten.

Aged 19, she played one of the main roles in the Russian comedy fairytale Last Knight (2017), which became the highest-grossing film in the history of Russian cinema after a month of release.

In April 2022, due to her criticism of the Russian invasion of Ukraine, Syvatska was banned from entering the territory of the Russian Federation.

== Selected filmography ==
- 2013-14 — Muhtar's Return as Angela (Season 8); Dasha (Season 9)
- 2014 — Synevyr as Ivanka
- 2017 — Last Knight as Vasilisa the Wise
- 2020 — The Last Warrior: Root of Evil as Vasilisa the Wise
- 2020 — Cossacks. Absolutely False Story as Mariana
- 2021 — The Last Warrior: A Messenger of Darkness as Vasilisa the Wise
