= Black Lightning (2009 film) =

- Theatrical release poster
- Directed by: Aleksandr Voytinskiy; Dmitriy Kiselev
- Written by: Dmitry Aleinikov; Alexander Talal; Aleksandr Voitinskiy; Mikhail Vrubel
- Produced by: Timur Bekmambetov
- Starring: Grigoriy Dobrygin; Ekaterina Vilkova; Sergei Garmash; Viktor Verzhbitsky
- Cinematography: Sergei Trofimov
- Production companies: Bazelevs Company; Tabbak; Focus Features International
- Distributed by: Universal Pictures
- Release date: December 26, 2009 (Moscow)
- Running time: 100 minutes
- Countries: Russia; United States
- Language: Russian
- Budget: 550 million RUB
- Box office: $21,500,000

Black Lightning (Russian: Чёрная Молния; translit. Chernaya Molniya) is a 2009 Russian superhero film directed by Aleksandr Voytinskiy and Dmitriy Kiselev, and produced by Timur Bekmambetov.

== Plot ==
Dmitry "Dima" Maykov (Grigoriy Dobrygin) is a student at Moscow State University. For his birthday, his father (Sergei Garmash), gives him a black '66 Volga. In the glove compartment, Dima finds an old photo of three scientists and an old audio record, but he gives them no mind.

Dima is in love with his classmate Nastya Svetlova (Yekaterina Vilkova). Dima believes that the only way to her heart lies through money and status, which in turn are only attainable through ambitiousness and egoism. This belief is strengthened when Dima sees the success of Nastya's friend, Max (Ivan Zhidkov), who also happens to have a Mercedes.

Dima begins working as a flower delivery boy. During one of the runs, he gets into trouble with Kuptsov's men, and while being chased by them, accidentally engages the car's flight system. Losing control of the flying car, Dima crash lands into an abandoned building. With Max's help, Dima is able to play the record from the glove box which helps him track down two of the scientists in the photo, Pavel Perepelkin and Olga Romantseva, who turn out to be husband and wife. Dima, pretending to be a newspaper reporter, asks them about the car. The Volga is revealed to be a product of a Soviet black project, equipped with multiple rocket engines allowing supermaneuverable flight, as well as a device called "nano-catalyzer" which transmutes ordinary gasoline into high-yield nanofuel to power them. Romantsova gives Dima the car's manual, which the third scientist, Mikhail Yelizarov, wrote. At first, Dima enjoys the flights and makes decent money delivering flowers while avoiding the infamous Moscow traffic jams. But his egotism leads Dima to leave a stabbed man on the street instead of helping him, and that man later turns out to be his own father.

The death of his father changes Dima's outlook on life. He decides to use his car to help people in need. He rapidly gains many fans among the city dwellers, and newspapers grant him the nickname "Black Lightning."

Meanwhile, Kuptsov starts a hunt for the nano-catalyzer, which can produce fuel needed to power his tectonic drill concealed within one of the Moscow City skyscrapers. The drill will allow Kuptsov to reach a layer of diamonds located beneath the tectonic plate, but will likely destroy the city in the process. Kuptsov finds the scientists who worked on the flying Volga and forces them to build the same kind of flight system for his Mercedes, as well as outfit it with weaponry and armor shielding. Kuptsov lures Dima out by letting Perepelkin, one of the scientists, escape to the roof of the skyscraper. Kuptsov then ambushes "Black Lightning" with rocket fire from his Mercedes, stealing the nano-catalyzer and sending the Volga falling down, crashing into the ice and sinking to the bottom of the Moscow River.

A call from his girlfriend, Nastya, that says that she really loves him, brings the hero back to his senses. Dima remembers the emergency backup tank with 30 minutes' worth of nanofuel, bursts out from under the ice, and rushes into Kuptsov's lair, freeing the scientists and recapturing the nano-catalyzer. He then flies to pick up Nastya, but Kuptsov beats him to her, taking her as a hostage and offering to trade her for the nano-catalyzer. Dima and Kuptsov confront each other over the Red Square. Dima flashes his headlights and honks the horn in a special signal that Nastya knows about. Nastya jumps out of Kuptsov's car and Dima grabs her in midair, safely landing her to the earth below. The final battle between the flying cars in the sky above Moscow ends with Dima luring Kuptsov's car to the outer reaches of the atmosphere, where the Mercedes runs out of nanofuel. Kuptsov floats in the Earth's orbit, left for dead.

Dima and Nastya meet on the ground and celebrate the New Year together.

== Cast ==
- Grigoriy Dobrygin as Dimitri (Dima) Maykov/Black Lightning
- Ekaterina Vilkova as Nastya Svetlova
- Viktor Verzhbitsky as Prof. Viktor Kuptsov
- Sergei Garmash as Pavel Maykov (Dmitry's father)
- Yelena Valyushkina as Nastasia Maykova (Dmitry's mother)
- Ekaterina Starshova as Tanya Maykova (Dmitry's sister)
- Ivan Zhidkov as Maxim
- Igor Savochkin as Boria Ivanovich
- Valeri Zolotukhin as Pavel Perepelkin
- Yekaterina Vasilyeva as Olga Romantseva
- Juozas Budraitis as Mikhail Yelizarov
- Dato Bakhtadze as Bahram Makhamedovich
- Mikhail Yefremov as the Drunk guy

== Reception ==
Black Lightning was met with mixed to slightly positive reviews in Russian media, according to review aggregator Kritikanstvo.

== Box office ==
According to KinoPoisk, the movie grossed $19,680,848 in Russia to a total of $21,500,000 worldwide, against a budget of $8,000,000 and a marketing budget of $7,000,000.

== Facts about the car ==
"Black Lightning" "played" 10 Volga GAZ-21 cars. Additionally, 100 computer prototypes were made. The number of "Black Lightning" "19-91 DEE" comes from the famous meme "Leprozoria" - DEE1991GR. In the course of the film, there are other references to "Leprozoria", for example, when the car flies into an abandoned building, it says on the wall: "Leprechaun" and "Hello Leprosy!"

According to the film, the flying car "Black Lightning" weighs four tons, accelerates to 300 km/h and can hang in the air.

== Video game ==
Based on the film, two video games were created. Black Lightning repeated the plot of the film, while Black Lightning: Nastya's Adventures was a spin-off about Nastya Svetlova.

== Potential remake ==
On June 30, 2010, in Variety, it was reported that Timur Bekmambetov was conducting talks with Universal Pictures about setting up an English remake of this film. However, as of writing, no new news about the remake had been received.
