= The Monk and the Demon =

- Directed by: Nikolay Dostal
- Written by: Yuri Arabov
- Produced by: Igor Tolstunov; Sergey Kozlov; Oleg Pozdneev; Alexander Dostal; Anna Kagarlitskaya
- Starring: Timofey Tribuntsev; Boris Kamorzin
- Cinematography: Levan Kapanadze
- Music by: Alexander Sokolov
- Production company: Profit
- Release date: 8 September 2016
- Running time: 114 min
- Country: Russia
- Language: Russian

The Monk and the Demon (Russian: Монах и бес, romanized: Monakh i bes) is a 2016 Russian comedy film directed by Nikolay Dostal. It is inspired by the life of Ilya (Archbishop of Novgorod).

== Plot ==
Fantastic story of the first half of the 19th century. In the monastery there is a new resident Ivan. But along with the monk, dark forces penetrate the monastery, which materialize in the person of the Legion (as he introduced himself to Ivan). The Legion chose Ivan as the object of his diabolical work, tempting him in every possible way in order to knock off his chosen way of serving God. But the stronger the temptation, the stronger the spiritual strength of Ivan.

== Cast ==
- Timofey Tribuntsev as Ivan the monk
- Boris Kamorzin as Hegumen of the monastery
- Nikita Tarasov as Nicholas I
- Sergey Barkovsky as Alexander von Benckendorff
- Roman Madyanov as bishop

== Awards ==
- Golden Eagle Award for Best Screenplay (Yuri Arabov)
- Nika Award for Best Screenplay (Yuri Arabov), for Best Actor (Timofey Tribuntsev), for Best Supporting Actor (Boris Kamorzin), for Best Sound (Maxim Belovolov)
