= George Kallis =

Cypriot composer

Background information
- Origin: Cyprus
- Occupation: Composer

George Kallis is a Cypriot film and TV composer based in Los Angeles.

== Life and career ==
Kallis grew up on the Mediterranean island of Cyprus, where he studied classical piano and violin while also being influenced by world music, heavy metal and jazz. By the age of 18, Kallis had already won several musical competitions, and he was awarded a scholarship at Berklee College of Music in Boston, where he graduated with a BM in Composition and Film Scoring. Soon after, he was accepted to study with acclaimed British composer Joseph Horowitz at the Royal College of Music in London, where he graduated with a Masters of Music in Composition. George has been nominated twice for an AMAA Academy Award for his scores 93 Days, starring Danny Glover, and A Place in the Stars.

According to film music critics he is "one of the most exciting and talented young composers to emerge in the film music world in quite some time" (Movie Music UK, 2017). His latest scores are Disney's fantasy adventure The Last Warrior and the historical drama Cliffs of Freedom, starring Tania Raymonde, Jan Uddin, Raza Jaffrey, Patti LuPone, Christopher Plummer, Billy Zane, and Lance Henriksen. In February 2018, George won "Breakthrough Composer of the Year" voted by the International Film Music Critics Association (IFMCA). Also in 2018, he won The Jerry Goldsmith award for Best Score for a Feature Film - the score for The Last Warrior (The Walt Disney Company CIS).

Kallis conducting the Budapest Symphony Orchestra for A Place in the Stars (2014).

== Feature films ==
Kallis has composed music for over 25 feature films, including the score to Gagarin, the biopic movie of the first cosmonaut Yuri Gagarin, which he recorded with the Russian State Symphony Orchestra and Choir. His previous work includes the music for Highlander: The Source (Lionsgate) directed by award-winning director Brett Leonard, and the UK prison drama Screwed (Lionsgate), directed by Reg Traviss, with whom he also collaborated on the WWII feature Joy Division (Momentum Pictures). He also scored the Scandinavian Christmas blockbuster Julefrokosten (Fridthjof Films), starring Thure Lindhardt (Angels & Demons) and supermodel Helena Christensen. Kallis' score for the independent road drama Dry Run features spacious acoustic guitars and distorted harmonicas, and in October 2012 he conducted the Budapest Symphony Orchestra for the score recordings of the Nigerian film A Place in the Stars, directed by Steve Gukas. He composed the music for the film Cliffs of Freedom, scheduled to be released on March 1, 2019.

== Documentaries and TV ==
Kallis was the chosen composer to score the opening titles of the BAFTA and Emmy-awarded series Horizon on BBC2. The music was composed to celebrate its 40th year running. His other work for the BBC was the opening titles for the children series My Life produced by BAFTA winning producer Kez Margie. This year, Kallis scored the series Inside the Gangster's Code (Discovery Channel) produced by NerdTV. In addition he collaborated with Emmy award-winning producer Virginia Williams, where he provided music for the IMOW's Global Motherhood/Maternal Health exhibition. The Red Kite Project was also a fascinating project for Kallis, exploring theatrical initiatives, which improved the lives of children with autism. The documentary was directed by award-winning filmmaker Kerry Shaw Brown. Kallis' other documentary work includes music for the Danish "Drengen Dre Ville k Krig", which was part of the international award-winning series, Vores Krig (Our War), and music for the CNN African Journalist Awards in 2009, inspired by the struggles journalists face in Africa.

== TV spots and trailer music ==
Amongst many others, Kallis' TV spot work includes the sci-fi music for the US campaign for McDonalds' "Earth's Treasure" (Moroch), the US campaign for Toshiba's 3D LED Cinema TV displays, and the Sydney Council's "Zero Waste" campaign. Trailer music includes Garfield's Pet Force (20th Century Fox) and Into the White (Zentropa). Kallis is currently launching Superior Music Audio, a music production house and publisher specializing in high-end music for motion picture advertising from his base in London, with a permanent move over to Los Angeles in early 2013.

== Licensing / music placements ==
Kallis' compositions are regularly licensed worldwide on major international and high-profile TV shows including Emmy and BAFTA-awarded programs such as The Fifth Estate on CBS, Fetch on PBS, Ultimate Fighting Championship[ (UFC), America's Most Wanted (20th Century Fox), Farah's Story (NBC/C4), and Will & Grace (NBC), to name a few.

== Songwriting ==
Kallis was introduced to composition through songwriting and won various awards while growing up in Cyprus. His debut CD Where There Is a Child, which included lyrics by Nobel-Prize nominated writer Kypros Chrysanthis, earned Kallis a Gold CD Record by Galaxy Music. Kallis donated all the album's proceeds for the relief of children who suffer from leukemia. During his studies, Kallis represented Cyprus as a songwriter in the Eurovision Song Contest in Jerusalem, which was watched by over 40 million people worldwide. Kallis' recent song, "The Sun Is Gonna Shine", was the theme tune for Highlander: The Source, sung by John Sloman (Uriah Heep).

== Filmography ==
- Screwed (2011)
- Gagarin: First in Space (2013)
- A Place in the Stars (2014)
- Anti-Social (2015)
- Operator (2015)
- 93 Days (2016)
- Last Knight (2017)
- Cliffs of Freedom (2019)
- After We Fell (2021)
- After Ever Happy (2022)
- See you on Venus (2023)
- After Everything (2023)
