= Elena Yakovleva =

Russian actress (born 1961)

- Елена Яковлева
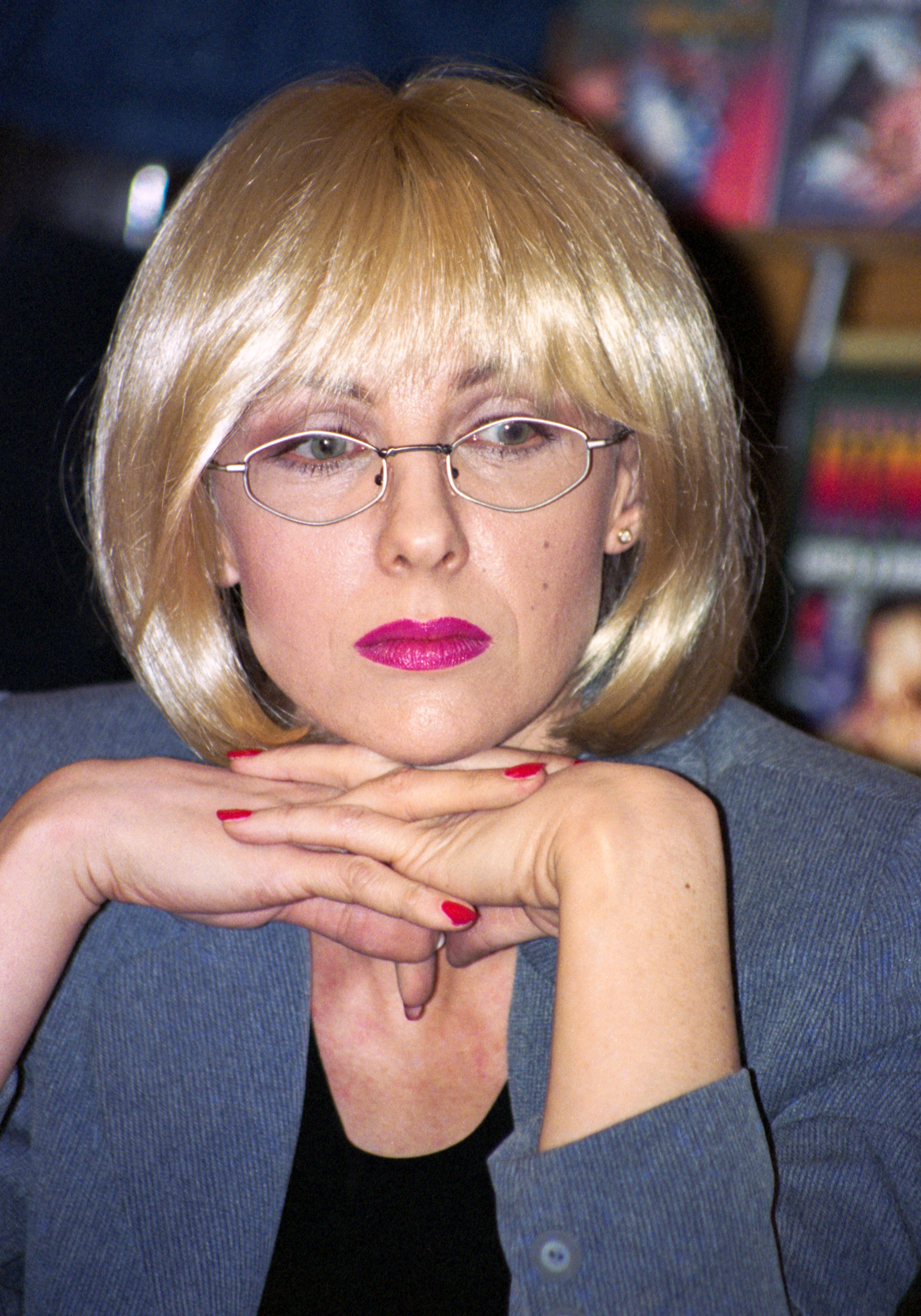
- Elena Yakovleva in 2000
- Born: Elena Alexeevna Yakovleva; 5 March 1961 (age 65); Zviahel, Ukrainian SSR, Soviet Union
- Citizenship: Soviet Union; Russia
- Occupations: Actress, television
- Years active: 1983–present
- Spouse: Valeri Shalnykh
- Children: 1
- Awards: Nika Award (1990, 1993); TEFI (2004); Golden Eagle Award (2005, 2017)

Elena Alexeevna Yakovleva (Russian: Еле́на Алексе́евна Я́ковлева; born 5 March 1961) is a Soviet and Russian actress known for her roles in such films as Intergirl and Encore, Once More Encore! as well as for the main role in the popular TV-series Kamenskaya.

She is a long-term actress in the Moscow Sovremennik Theatre. In 2002, Yakovleva was awarded the title People's Artist of Russia. Laureate of the State Prize of Russian Federation in the field of literature and art in 2000. She was awarded the Order of Honour (2006).

== Biography ==
After graduating from high school, Yakovleva was admitted to one of the leading theaters in Moscow, the Sovremennik Theatre. In 1986, she proposed to go to the Moscow Drama Theater named after M.N. Yermolova - a theater located in Moscow.

== Selected filmography ==
Year	Title	Role	Notes
1987	Plumbum, or The Dangerous Game	Mariya	
1989	Intergirl	Tanya Zaitseva	
1989	The Stairway	Alevtina Ivanova	
1992	Encore, Once More Encore!	Anya Kryukova	
1992	Education for women and cruelty dogs	Anna	
1995	What a Wonderful Game	Vera Markelova	
1995	St. Petersburg secrets	Princess Anne Chechevinskaya	TV series
1999–2011	Kamenskaya	Anastasia Kamenskaya	TV series
2006	Nobody knows about sex	Kesha's mother	
2007	I’m Staying		
2010	In the Style of Jazz		
2013	Vangelia		
2016	Flight Crew	Irina	
2017	The Last Warrior	Baba Yaga, the wise woman and a witch.	
2017	Yolki 6	Andrei's mother	
2018	A Rough Draft	mother of Kirill Maksimov	
2020	Cosmoball	Anton's mother	
2021	The Last Warrior: Root of Evil; The Last Warrior 2	Baba Yaga, a witch doctor and sorceress.	
2021	The Last Warrior: A Messenger of Darkness; The Last Warrior 3	Baba Yaga	
2022	Dalyokiye blizkiye	Nadezhda	
2023	Cheburashka	Rimma	
2023	Off the Rails	Anna Smolina's mother	
2025	Finist. The First Warrior	Baba Yaga	
2026	Tyulpany	Tamara	
