= Timofey Tribuntsev =

Russian actor

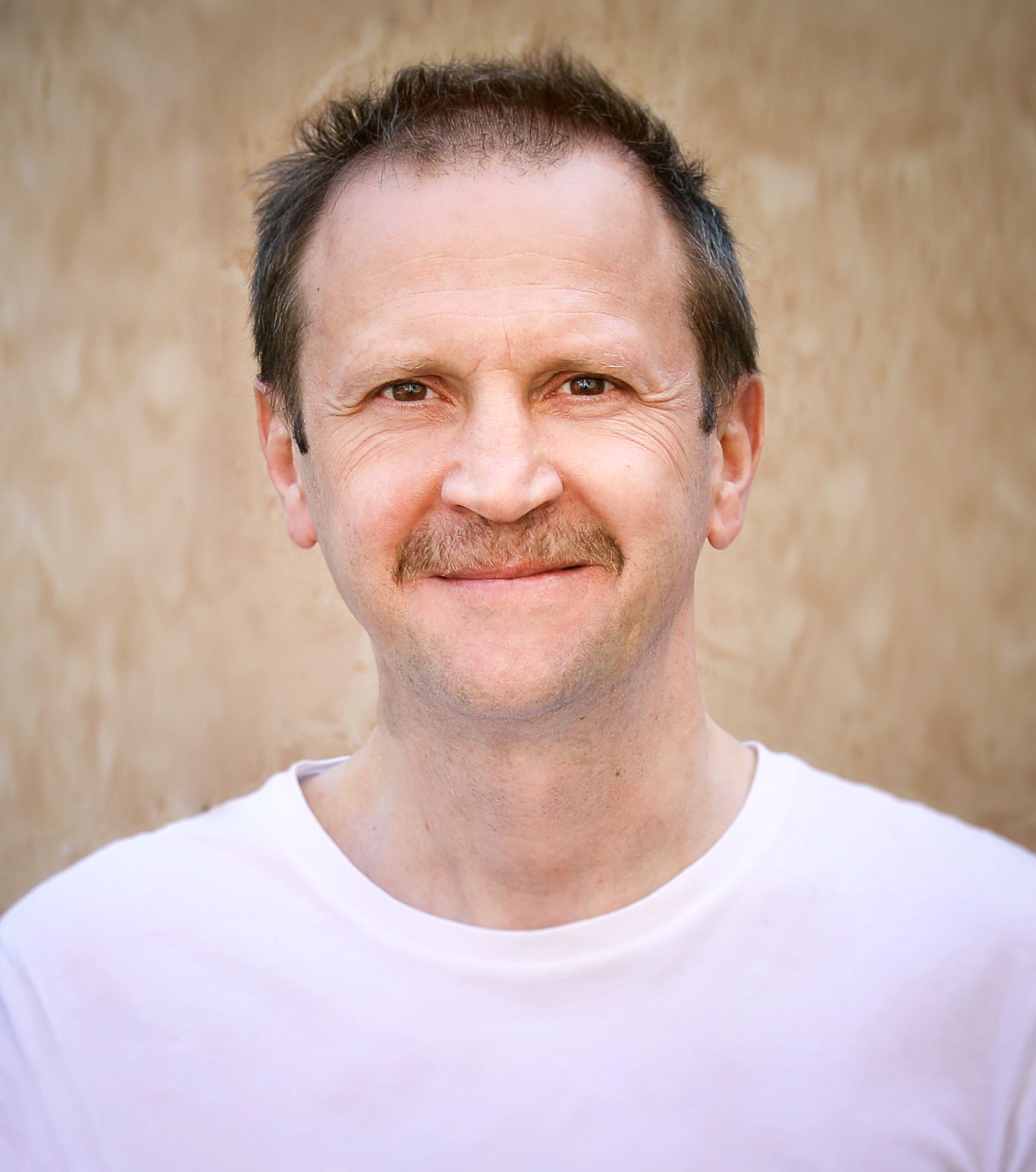
- Timofey Tribuntsev
- Born: Timofey Vladimirovich Tribuntsev; 1 July 1973 (age 52); Kirov
- Occupation: Actor
- Years active: 2000–present

Timofey Vladimirovich Tribuntsev (Russian: Тимофе́й Влади́мирович Трибу́нцев) is a Russian actor. Winner of the Nika Award 2017.

== Biography ==
He was born on 1 July 1973 in the city of Kirov.

From the age of 15, he participated in productions of the Kirov theatre Grotesk.

His mother, Tatyana Gennadyevna Semakova, and his cousin, Alexey Panteleyev, still perform at the Kirov theatre Grotesk.

Before beginning his professional acting career, he worked in various fields unrelated to acting (including employment in the police). In 1998, he moved to Moscow and enrolled in the Mikhail Shchepkin Higher Theatre School. After graduating in 2002, he was invited by Konstantin Raikin to join the Satirikon Theatre, where he was cast in the production King Lear.

In addition to the Satirikon, he periodically performs at other theatres, including the Elena Kamburova Theatre, the Kazantsev Centre for Drama and Directing, the Theatre Partnership “814”, and the Practice Theatre.

He is a laureate of several awards: the Chaika Award for his role as Kent in King Lear; the APKiT Award for Best Supporting Actor in the television series Dead Souls; as well as the Nika Award and the White Elephant for his role as the monk Ivan in the film The Monk and the Demon directed by Nikolay Dostal, among others.

He made his screen debut in the television series Truckers, but gained widespread recognition after the release of Pavel Lungin’s film The Island, in which he portrayed the main character in his youth.

In 2013, two television series premiered: Department and Women’s Day, both featuring Tribuntsev in leading roles. In 2014, the comedy film Only Girls in Sport was released theatrically.

In 2015, he appeared in the television series Rodina, And Quiet Flows the Don, The Method, and Fartsa.

In 2017 and 2020, respectively, he played the magician Svetozar in the films The Last Warrior and The Last Warrior: Root of Evil. In between, in 2018, he portrayed lawyer Daniil Golovkin in the television series House Arrest.

In 2020, the historical drama Silver Skates was released in Russia, in which Tribuntsev played Pyotr the lamplighter, the father of the main character.

In September 2021, the crime comedy Boomerang, directed by Pyotr Buslov and starring Timofey Tribuntsev and Dmitry Nagiev in the leading roles, was released.

=== Public stance ===
In November 2023, he signed a letter addressed to Ombudsman Tatyana Moskalkova requesting a change in the measure of restraint for the defendants in the Theatre Case

== Selected filmography ==
Year	Title	Role	Notes
2006	The Island	young Anatoly	
2015	One Particular Pioneer	Oleg Vityushkin	
2014	Iron Ivan		
2015	The Method	Kolya	TV
2016	The Monk and the Demon	Ivan	
2017	Last Knight	Svetozar	
2017	Furious	Zakhar	
2018	House Arrest	Daniil Golovkin	TV
2020	The Silver Skates	Pyotr	
2020	Doctor Lisa	Gennady Yershov	
2021	The Last Warrior: Root of Evil	Svetozar	
2021	Captain Volkonogov Escaped	Major Golovnya	
2023	Three Minutes of Silence	Yuri "Yurik"	
2023	Matthew Passion		
2025	Overheard in Rybinsk	Yuri Maltsev	TV series
