= Yelena Valyushkina =

Russian actress (born 1962)

- Елена Валюшкина
- Born: Yelena Viktorovna Valyushkina; 8 December 1962 (age 63); Potsdam, East Germany
- Citizenship: Soviet Union; Russia
- Occupation: Actress
- Years active: 1974-present

Yelena Viktorovna Valyushkina (also tr. Elena; Russian: Еле́на Ви́кторовна Валю́шкина; born 8 December 1962) is a Russian theatre and film actress. She was awarded the honorary title of Honoured Artist of the Russian Federation in 1995.

== Biography ==
Valyushkina was born into a military family in the Soviet Union. After her family returned from the German Democratic Republic, she spent part of her childhood in the city of Biysk in the Altai Territory. While in high school, she lived with her grandmother in Tomilino and simultaneously studied at music (learning piano and guitar), dance and art schools. In 1984 she graduated from the Mikhail Shchepkin Higher Theatre School (course of Viktor Korshunov and Vladimir Sulimov). Since January 1984, she has been an actress at the Mossovet Theatre.

While studying at drama school, in 1982 she made her film debut when she starred in the comedy I Don't Want to Be an Adult. Immediately after graduating from college, in 1984, she played the main role of Maria in Mark Zakharov's musical comedy Formula of Love: a charming, big-eyed girl who was not afraid to go with Count Cagliostro to cure daddy. The role brought her great popularity and she began to receive many offers to act in films, but devoted herself to the theatre, playing only a few minor and episodic roles in cinema over the next 15 years. In theatre, Valyushkina has played more than thirty major roles.

In addition to working in theatre, she has also done voice work for animated cartoons and worked in the television program Road Patrol on TV-6, paired with Sergei Kolesnikov (in the credits of the program she was listed as Elena Yatsko). At one time in 2013 she hosted the TV show Battle of Psychics. In 2016, she starred in an advertisement for "Saturday Evening" on Russia-1 as a cleaner.

In 2013, director Zhora Kryzhovnikov in his film Kiss Them All! invited her to play the mother of the bride. Valyushkina was nominated for the Golden Eagle Award for Best Supporting Actress for her performance.

== Personal life ==
After graduating from college, Valyushkina married her teacher Leonid Fomin. The marriage lasted eleven years.

Her second husband is the Russian theatre and film actor and director Aleksandr Yatsko, who was named an Honoured Artist of the Russian Federation in 2005. They married in 1994 and worked together at the Mossovet Theatre but divorced 20 years later.

Valyushkina has two children, Vasily and Maria. Her hobbies include painting furniture, weaving beads, sewing and designing. As well as her native Russian, she speaks English, Spanish and French. She lives in Moscow.

== Selected filmography ==
List of film credits
Year	Title	Role	Notes
1982	I Don't Want to Be an Adult	Sveta	
1984	Formula of Love	Maria Ivanovna	
1986	How to Become Happy		
1991	Anna Karamazoff		episode
2009	Black Lightning	Nastasia Maykova	
2017	Naughty Grandma	Lilya, head	
2017	The Last Warrior	Galina	
2018	I Am Losing Weight	Olga	
2018	Night Shift	Elena Balashova	
2021	The Last Warrior: Root of Evil; The Last Warrior 2	Galina	
2021	The Last Warrior: A Messenger of Darkness; The Last Warrior 3	Galina	
2021	Love	Tanya	
2021	Milk	school principal	
2023	The Challenge	Galina	
