= Viktor Khorinyak =

Russian actor

- Виктор Хориняк
- Born: Viktor Viktorovich Khorinyak; 22 March 1990 (age 36); Minusinsk, Krasnoyarsk Krai, RSFSR, USSR (now Russia)
- Occupation: Actor
- Years active: 2007-present

Viktor Viktorovich Khorinyak (Russian: Ви́ктор Ви́кторович Хориня́к; born March 22, 1990) is a Russian actor. Artist of the after Anton Chekhov Moscow Art Theatre. Known for his role as the bartender Konstantin Anisimov in the television series Kitchen. He appeared in about 40 films.

== Biography ==
Khorinyak was born on March 22, 1990, in Minusinsk, Krasnoyarsk Krai, Russian SFSR, Soviet Union (now Russia). He graduated from the Moscow Art Theater School in 2011, after which he took part in a number of performances. In 2007, he made his first film debut.

== Acting career ==
Since 2007, Viktor Khorinyak has been acting in films, since 2010 he began to actively appear in television series. Gained popularity, starring in the role of the bartender Kostya Anisimov in the television series Kitchen and the 2014 film The Kitchen in Paris.

== Selected filmography ==
=== Film ===
List of film credits
Year	Title	Role	Notes
2014	The Kitchen in Paris	Konstantin Anisimov	
2017	The Last Warrior	Ivan Ilyich Naydyonov / Ivan the Fool	
2019	Sober Driver	Artyom	
2021	The Last Warrior: Root of Evil; The Last Warrior 2	Ivan Ilyich Naydyonov / Ivan Ilyich Muromets	
2021	The Last Warrior: A Messenger of Darkness; The Last Warrior 3	Ivan Ilyich Naydyonov	
2022	Mister Knockout	Valeri Popenchenko	
2022	Disobedient	Dima	
2023	Off the Rails	Valera	

=== Television ===
List of television credits
Year	Title	Role	Notes
2012	Kitchen	Konstantin Anisimov	
2013	The Thaw	actor Ruslan	
