= Konstantin Lavronenko =

Soviet and Russian actor

- Константин Лавроненко
- Born: Konstantin Nikolaevich Lavronenko; Rostov-on-Don, RSFSR, USSR
- Citizenship: Soviet Union; Russia
- Occupation: Actor
- Years active: 1981–present
- Awards: People's Artist of Russia (2024); Order of Friendship (2016)

Konstantin Nikolaevich Lavronenko (Russian: Константи́н Никола́евич Лавро́ненко) is a Soviet and Russian actor known for his role as the mysterious father of two boys in 2003 film Vozvrashcheniye (international English title The Return). Lavronenko won the Best Actor prize at the 2007 Cannes Film Festival for The Banishment.

== Early life ==
Konstantin Lavronenko was born in Rostov-on-Don, Russian SFSR, Soviet Union, in southern Russia.

== Filmography ==
=== Film ===
- 1984 — Still Loving, Still Hoping as Zhenya
- 1992 — Andryusha as Andrey
- 1998 — Composition for Victory Day as Kostya
- 2003 — The Return as father
- 2005 — The Master as Master
- 2006 — Nanjing Landscape as Aleksander
- 2007 — The Banishment as Alex
- 2007 — Not Gonna Get Us as Colonel Valiev
- 2007 — Open The Door, It's Ded Moroz! as Ded Moroz
- 2007 — Liquidation as Chekan
- 2008 — Terra Nova as Zhilin
- 2010 — Kajínek as Jiří Kajínek
- 2010 — Zaytsev, Come On! The Story of a Showman as Aleksander Tross
- 2012 — The Three Mouse Mafia as Squeak The Mouse
- 2013 — Territory as Chinkov
- 2013 — The Three Musketeers as Buckingham
- 2016 — Earthquake as Konstantin Berezhnoy
- 2017 — The Last Warrior as Koschey
- 2019 — The Blackout as Mayor Dolmatov
- 2019 — Robo as general
- 2020 — Coma as Yan
- 2021 — The Last Warrior: Root of Evil as Koschey
- 2021 — The Last Warrior: A Messenger of Darkness as Koschey

=== Television ===
- 2003 — No Escape from Love as Savior Semen
- 2005 — Archangel as Joseph
- 2008 — Weapons as Kirill Reutov, FSB colonel
- 2008 — Ordered to Destroy! as Pyotr Gavrin
- 2009 — Isayev as Vasily Blyukher
- 2010 — Each Has its Own War as Stepan Kharlamov
- 2011 — Bystander as Volgin
- 2011 — Made in USSR as Nikolay Vetrov
- 2013 — The Price of Life as Ilya Shagin
- 2014 — Catherine as Count Jean Armand de Lestocq
- 2016 — Klim as Klim
- 2019 — Gold Diggers as Pavel Chistyakov

== Awards and nominations ==
Year	Award	Category	Nominated work	Result	Ref.
2003	Gijón International Film Festival	Best Actor	The Return	Won	
2007	Cannes Film Festival	Best Leading Actor	The Banishment	Won	
2008	Nika Award	Best Actor	The Banishment	Nominated	
2009	Russian National Movie Awards	Best Russian Actor		Nominated	
2011	Czech Lion Awards	Best Actor in Leading Role	Kajínek	Nominated	
2014	Russian National Movie Awards	Best Russian Actor of the Decade		Nominated	
2017	Golden Eagle Award	Best Television Actor	Klim (TV series)	Won	
2017	APKIT Awards	Best Actor in a TV Movie/Series	Klim (TV series)	Nominated	
2024	People's Artist of the Russian Federation			Won	
