= Dmitry Dyachenko =

Russian film director and screenwriter

Dmitriy Dyachenko
- Born: Dmitriy Vladimirovich Dyachenko; September 16, 1972 (age 53); Voronezh, Soviet Union (now Russia)
- Citizenship: Russian Federation
- Occupations: film director, film producer, screenwriter

Dmitriy Vladimirovich Dyachenko (Russian: Дмитрий Владимирович Дьяченко, born September 16, 1972) is a Russian director, producer and screenwriter. He is best known for his comedy movies starring Kvartet I that became box office hits in Russia.

== Filmography ==
=== As director ===
- Radio Day (2008)
- Big Difference (2008)
- What Men Talk About (2010)
- What Men Still Talk About (2011)
- Kitchen (2012)
- Faster Than Rabbits (2014)
- The Kitchen in Paris (2014)
- Wonderland (2016)
- Super Bobrovs (2015)
- The Last Warrior (2017)
- The Last Warrior: Root of Evil (2021)
- The Last Warrior 3 (2021)
- Cheburashka (2023)
- Beshenstvo (2023)
- Finist. The First Warrior (2025)
- Cheburashka 2 (2025)

=== As producer ===
- Kitchen (2012)
- Bystree, chem kroliki (2014)
- The Kitchen in Paris (2014)
- Super Bobrovs (2015)
- Otel Eleon (2016)
