= Love (2021 film) =

2021 film

- Directed by: Igor Tverdokhlebov
- Written by: Sergei Svetlakov; Said Davdiev; Yakov Sivchenko
- Produced by: Sergei Svetlakov; David Kocharov; Oleg Tumanov; Said Davdiev; Alexander Nezlobin; Maksim Lebedev; Liliya Gaynanova
- Starring: Sergei Svetlakov; Timur Batrutdinov; Yan Tsapnik; Kamil Larin; Stanislav Yarushin
- Cinematography: Mark Ziselson
- Edited by: Alexander Amirov; Alexander Ivanov
- Music by: Andrei Timonin
- Production companies: Sverdlovsk Film Studios; STS
- Distributed by: KaroRental
- Release date: February 11, 2021
- Running time: 91 minutes
- Country: Russia
- Language: Russian

Love (Russian: Love, lit. 'Lyubov') is a 2021 Russian romantic comedy-drama film directed by Igor Tverdokhlebov. It was theatrically released in Russia on February 11, 2021 by KaroRental.

== Plot ==
Various guests come to the Love Hotel, each seeking love, connection, or simply an escape from loneliness.

Among the guests are former classmates reuniting for the first time in 40 years, rekindling old feelings as they gather in the hotel restaurant. Meanwhile, a jealous husband searches every room on the floor, determined to find his wife, who has mysteriously stopped responding to his calls. Elsewhere, a private detective and his client conduct a covert operation using eavesdropping devices to expose the woman’s unfaithful husband.

A housekeeper, an immigrant from Uzbekistan, faces a difficult choice between love for her boyfriend and a cash offer from his mother to return home. Lastly, a timid student arrives at the hotel hoping to transform himself, only to experience a life-changing encounter with the town’s most talkative escort.

== Cast ==
- Sergei Svetlakov as Boris
- Timur Batrutdinov as Yury
- Yan Tsapnik as Konstantin
- Kamil Larin as Igor
- Stanislav Yarushin as Anton, a concierge
- Iris Lebedeva as a bride
- Yevgeny Romantsov as a groom
- Natalya Parshenkova as a housemaid
- Sabina Akhmedova as Gulya, a housemaid
- Makar Zaporozhsky as Oleg, a Russian police
- Irina Rozanova as Oleg's mother
- Anatoliy Beliy as Maxim
- Maria Mironova as Olga
- Yuri Stoyanov as Dima
- Yelena Valyushkina as Tanya
- Igor Zolotovitsky as Nikolay
- Alina Alexeeva as Lyuba
- Ekaterina Varnava as Violetta
- Filipp Ershov as Semen
- Ksenia Sobchak as herself
