= The Last Warrior: Root of Evil =

2021 Russian comedy fantasy film by Dmitry Dyachenko

- Theatrical release poster
- Directed by: Dmitriy Dyachenko
- Written by: Vitaliy Shlyappo; Dimitriy Yan; Vasiliy Kutsenko; Pavel Danilov; Igor Tudvasev
- Based on: Russian: Bogatyr; English: Hero or Warrior
- Produced by: Kakhaber Abashidze; Eduard Iloyan; Anton Zlatopolskiy (ru); Vitaliy Shlyappo (ru); Denis Zhalinskiy
- Starring: Viktor Khorinyak; Mila Sivatskaya; Ekaterina Vilkova; Elena Yakovleva; Konstantin Lavronenko; Sergey Burunov; Yelena Valyushkina; Kirill Zaytsev; Timofey Tribuntsev; Garik Kharlamov
- Cinematography: Pavel Kapinos
- Music by: George Kallis
- Production companies: The Walt Disney Company CIS; Yellow, Black and White; Russia-1; Cinema Fund Russia
- Distributed by: Walt Disney Studios Motion Pictures International
- Release date: January 1, 2021
- Running time: 121 minutes
- Country: Russia
- Language: Russian
- Budget: ₽650 million
- Box office: ₽2.046 billion; $28.3 million (Worldwide); $28.6 million (Russia/CIS)

The Last Warrior: Root of Evil (Russian: Последний богатырь: Корень зла, lit. 'The Last Bogatyr: Root of Evil'; also known as The Last Warrior 2) is a 2021 Russian fantasy comedy film, a sequel to the 2017's The Last Warrior (The Last Knight). The film is directed by Dmitry Dyachenko, and produced by The Walt Disney Company CIS, The Walt Disney Company's subsidiary in Russia, in collaboration with the Russian production company Yellow, Black and White.

A new story about the meeting of two worlds - modern Moscow, Russia and the fabulous Belogorie, Ancient Rus'. The Rus' people were the heroes of Russian fairy tales, epics and legends live. Ivan Naydenov, having tried on the role of Bogatyr, discovers the origins of the ancient evil that threatens Belogorie and participates in an epic battle shoulder to shoulder with folk heroes.

The film stars Viktor Khorinyak, Mila Sivatskaya, Ekaterina Vilkova, Elena Yakovleva, Konstantin Lavronenko, Sergey Burunov, Yelena Valyushkina, and Kirill Zaytsev, the voices of Garik Kharlamov as the fairy tale Kolobok. Principal photography began in June 2019, the film crew moved between the Moscow Oblast, Republic of Karelia, the Perm Krai, and again the North Caucasus, where mountain panoramas and relic forests were found near Sochi, in the Sochi National Park.

The film was theatrically released in the Russian Federation by Walt Disney Studios Motion Pictures International on January 1, 2021.

A sequel, The Last Warrior: A Messenger of Darkness, was released in December 2021.

== Plot ==
The film begins with the campaign of Ivan and the heroes, led by Finist - the Clear Falcon, who, being the strongest of the squad, makes fun of Vanya, who is deprived of heroic strength. After successfully capturing the monster, who turned out to be Kolobok , who was attacking village cattle, Ivan returns to his mansion, furnished with modern technology. He gets tired of life in the conditions of Ancient Rus', so with the help of a treasure sword, he often returns to modern Moscow, dreaming of one day moving there with Vasilisa for good. However, she does not approve of this idea.

Competitions are held in Belogorye to identify the best hero. All participants, except Finist, fail the obstacle course, and Ivan, tired of the jokes in his direction and Finist’s attempts to flirt with Vasilisa, decides to take part himself in order to wipe his opponent’s nose. Before this, he tries to cross to Moscow, but the power of the treasure dries up and the portal does not open. If Finist passed the obstacle course with the help of strength and dexterity, then Ivan successfully does this using ingenuity and resourcefulness. However, the triumph of the protagonist is interrupted by Varvara and Galina, who arrive at the holiday to take the treasure sword from Ilya. They bewitch the heroes and send living roots over the village, a battle ensues, and the villains gain the upper hand. However, the old team of heroes, along with Finist and Kolobok who joined them, manage to escape,

In parallel with the events, scenes from the past are shown. An orphan girl and a peasant woman who decided to help her prick their fingers on a witch's flower and find themselves under the power of some terrible creature. It is impossible to be cured - Baba Yaga, when a peasant woman brings a sick girl to her, advises her to be drowned. The girl doesn’t do this, but at night the same thing happens to her.

On the way, Baba Yaga says that she had previously seen magic similar to this. 1000 years ago, the good sorcerer Belogor lived in these lands, but, finding himself on the verge of death, he decided to become immortal, for this he forged a treasure sword. His student Mikula decided to take immortality for himself and for this, turning to evil, betrayed his teacher and killed him, becoming Koshchei the Immortal. However, the dark force did not kill Belogor. Offended by people who did not value him and by the student who betrayed him, he became an evil creature consisting of roots - Rogoleb. To fully return to life, he needed a treasure sword. To search for the sword, he began to turn people into his servants, but of all, only Galina and Varvara were able to survive. Yaga says that only Koschey knows how to defeat Rogoleb. However, the heroes first have to pull him out of the land of the dead. To get there the characters use a whale fish, which only a person with heroic strength can control, which again gives Finist the opportunity to show his superiority. Then Ivan steals Yaga’s magical power berry, which is capable of providing incredible power. By eating it, he pretends that he has finally acquired heroic strength.

Having got to the guard of the land of the dead, Vanya deceives him with cunning and gets there in order to pick up Koshchei, but there he meets not only him, but also his father, recently killed by Rogoleb. Having got out of the land of the dead, Koschey says that you can kill Rogoleb by cutting the stone under which he was once buried with a treasure chest. On the way back, Ivan continues to use up his supply of magic berries in order to constantly boast of his special power. On the way to Belogorye, Ivan admits to Vasilisa that the treasure has lost its magical power, then she offers to take a break. At a rest stop, magical properties return to a treasure trove stuck in the ground.

In the morning, the heroes are overtaken by Varvara and her army and inflict a mortal wound on Finist. Ivan runs out of amplifiers, and the heroes are forced to flee, leaving the sword to Varvara. Ivan quarrels with Vasilisa and, as a result of the collapse, he is left alone with Kolobok, while the rest rush to Belogorye to save Finist with the help of living water. Varvara stops obeying her mother and, having found the treasure sword, tries to fly away with it. Galina catches up with her daughter, knocks her over the forest and bewitches her, but the sword falls from a height into the forest, where Miracle Yudo finds it and brings it to Ivan.

Ivan, Kolobok and Chudo-Yudo go to battle. The others and the rescued Finist fight with them. Kolobok eats Varvara, who has taken the guise of an owl. Koschey remembers too late that if you cut a stone with a sword, Rogoleb will not die, but, on the contrary, will be freed. The former white sorcerer resurrects in the form of a monster from the roots, binds and buries Koshchei, Baba Yaga and everyone else alive in the ground. He is going to kill Ivan too.

Ivan mentally meets with his deceased father, where he decides what he lives for. Heroic strength awakens in him, and together with Finist and Kolobok he fights Rogoleb, whose strength comes from the ground on which he stands. Ivan cuts space with a sword and sends the monster to modern Moscow, where instead of earth there is asphalt and concrete everywhere. The evil sorcerer Rogoleb dies, and Ivan’s buried friends are freed. Svetozar drives away and pursues Galina, and Ivan proposes to Vasilisa.

Post-credit scenes:

• Galina, asking the Great Darkness for help, plunges into a black lake to receive evil power.

• Many years ago, Ilya Muromets lived with his wife Galya. It turns out that this is the same girl whom Rogoleb bewitched along with the girl, and, concurrently, the named mother of Varvara and the biological mother of Ivan. Then comes a teaser hinting at a sequel .

== Cast ==
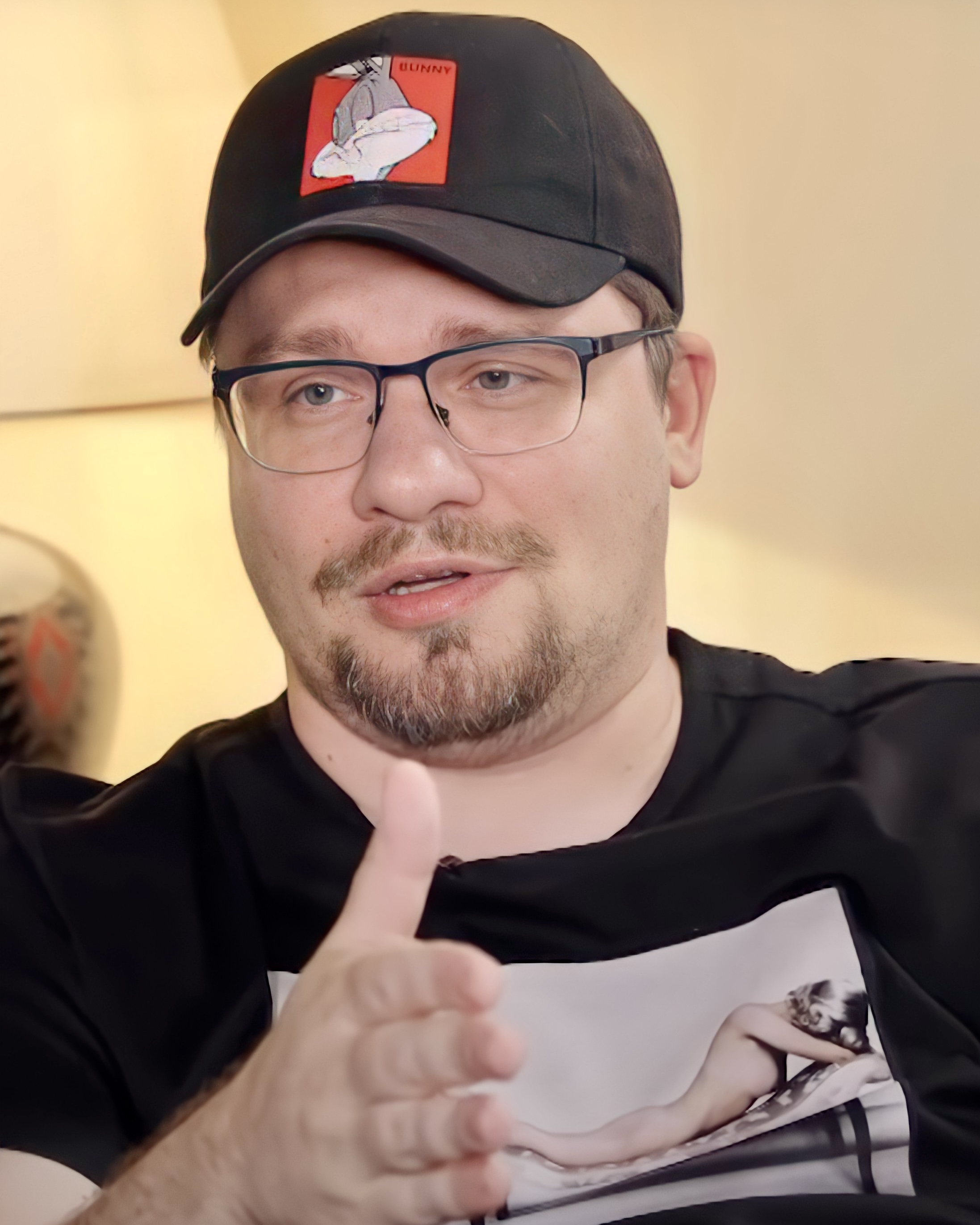
Garik Kharlamov the voice of Kolobok.

- Viktor Khorinyak as Ivan Ilyich Naydenov / Ivan Ilyich Muromets
- Mila Sivatskaya as Vasilisa the Wise
- Ekaterina Vilkova as Princess Varvara
  - Marta Timofeeva as Young Varvara
- Elena Yakovleva as Baba Yaga, a witch doctor and sorceress
- Konstantin Lavronenko as Koschei
- Sergey Burunov as Vodyanoy, a merman
- Yelena Valyushkina as Galina, Princess Varvara’s mother and the wife of Ilya Muromets
- Kirill Zaytsev as Finist the Falcon, a bogatyr
- Timofey Tribuntsev as the white mage Svetozar, a starets
- Garik Kharlamov as Kolobok (voice)
- Aleksandr Semchev as Chudo-Yudo, a monster
- Yuriy Tsurilo as Ilya Muromets, a bogatyr
- Vladislav Vetrov as Belogor / Rogoleb (voice)
- Andrey Trushin as a visiting bogatyr

== Production ==
=== Development ===
The writers of the film The Last Warrior: Root of Evil continued to follow the canon begun in the first film: they did not only invite evil spirits (Koschei, Baba Yaga, Vodyanoy) to their fairy tale, but also added new magical assistants - and above all, a stunning, dashing Kolobok.

Marina Zhigalova-Ozkan, Disney Studios in Russia and the CIS, added.

=== Filming ===
Principal photography of the film was shot on Krestovaya Hill near the city of Gubakha in the Urals, Krasnodar Krai and Republic of Karelia, and the main, where the whole city was, took place in the Moscow Oblast suburbs, where a special city was constructed for the film.

Filming began in June 2020. In the photographs from the set, various decorations were seen: huts, ice warriors. At the same time, it is known that the events of the film will take place both in winter and in summer.

== Release ==
The film was scheduled to release on December 24, 2020 in the United States and in Russia, it was released on January 1, 2021.

=== Marketing ===
On December 5, 2019, the first teaser trailer for the film was posted on the Odnoklassniki website.

== Reception ==
=== Box office ===
In the first week of distribution, the film grossed a whole billion rubles at the box office, and according to preliminary forecasts of Igromania magazine, the film has a chance to bypass the fees of the previous part and collect two billion rubles for the entire rental period. By the end of January 2021, the film was able to overcome the bar of two billion rubles, which is twenty-six and a half million dollars.

== Sequel ==
Filming for a sequel known as The Last Warrior: A Messenger of Darkness was held in the suburbs of Moscow and in the town of Barvikha. Filming for the film took place in the fall of 2019 and the film is scheduled for release in 2022. The film is directed by Dmitriy Dyachenko (director of previous films) produced by Eduard Iloyan, Marina Zhigalova-Ozkan and Vitaliy Shlyappo, according to a script written by Dimitriy Yan and Pavel Danilov, starring Viktor Khorinyak.

== See also ==
- The Last Warrior (2017 film)
- The Last Warrior: A Messenger of Darkness (2021 film)
