= Last Knight (film) =

2017 Russian comedy fantasy film by Dmitry Dyachenko

The Last Knight The Last Warrior
- Theatrical release poster
- Directed by: Dmitriy Dyachenko
- Screenplay by: Vitaliy Shlyappo; Dimitriy Yan; Pavel Danilov; Igor Tudvasev
- Based on: Baba Yaga and Koschei
- Produced by: Marina Zhigalova-Ozkan; Eduard Iloyan; Grigoriy Stoyalov; Olga Maksimova
- Starring: Viktor Khorinyak; Mila Sivatskaya; Konstantin Lavronenko; Elena Yakovleva; Ekaterina Vilkova; Sergey Burunov; Yevgeny Dyatlov
- Cinematography: Sergei Trofimov
- Edited by: Tim Pavelko; Anton Anisimov; Aleksandr Amirov
- Music by: George Kallis
- Production companies: Walt Disney Pictures; Yellow, Black and White
- Distributed by: Walt Disney Studios Sony Pictures Releasing CIS
- Release date: October 29, 2017 (Russia)
- Running time: 114 minutes
- Country: Russia
- Languages: Russian; English (dubbing)
- Budget: ~$8 million ₽370 million
- Box office: $30.5 million ₽1.731 billion

The Last Knight, also known as The Last Warrior (Russian: Последний богатырь, romanized: Poslyedniy bogatyr', lit. 'The Last Bogatyr') is a 2017 Russian-language fantasy comedy film directed by Dmitriy Dyachenko. The story develops around Baba Yaga and Koschei, both villains in traditional Russian fairy tales (as well as the fairy tales of other Slavic countries). The film was produced by the American film companies The Walt Disney Company CIS together with the Russian film companies Yellow, Black and White and Kinoslovo. The film stars Viktor Khorinyak, Mila Sivatskaya, Elena Yakovleva, Ekaterina Vilkova, Konstantin Lavronenko and Yevgeny Dyatlov.

It was scheduled to have a wide release on October 26, 2017. As of November 26, 2017, the film became the highest-grossing local-language release of all time in Russia, surpassing Stalingrad with 1.68 billion rubles ($28.8 million) and topping out at $30.5 million. In Russia, the film holds the 12th place biggest box-office audiences. This was Disney Russia's second film produced specifically for the Russian market, with the first being The Book of Masters (2009).

A sequel, titled The Last Warrior: Root of Evil, was released in January 2021 and a third film, The Last Warrior: A Messenger of Darkness, was released in December 2021.

== Plot ==
In Belogorie, a parallel version of Ancient Russia, Sorceress Varvara hunts down Alyosha Popovich whom she believes to be the last Bogatyr (Hero or Warrior). She petrifies and throws him into the sea, where hundreds of other victims rest.

In modern Moscow, Ivan Naydenov is a young orphan who makes his way in life by being a con artist. He poses as a "white mage", stars in rigged psychic contest shows, and performs "rites" for clients. He starts having doubts about his life choices, however, when asked to cure a comatose boy.

One day, during an escape from a client's husband, Ivan miraculously ends up in Belogorie. This magical world is inhabited by Russian fairy tales characters and creatures. A volkhv appears and claims that Ivan is the lost son of Ilya Muromets, hidden on Earth many years ago.

Ivan is then captured by Varvara's warriors and brought to prince Dobrynya Nikitich. Dobrynya is friendly, but princess Varvara imprisons Ivan in her dungeon without her husband's knowledge. There, Ivan meets a disembodied Koschei, who tells him the magical Sword Kladenets is his only way back to Earth. Koschei himself had used Kladenets to become immortal, but is overthrown and imprisoned by Bogatyrs. After the forces of good had won, most of the magical creatures were imprisoned or killed, then the Bogatyrs themselves suffered the same fate. If Ivan truly is Ilya's son, he can uncover the Sword and use it to restore power to the surviving magical creatures, and to return home.

Baba Yaga is captured and thrown into the same dungeon. However, this was premeditated: she brought Vasilisa the Wise in frog form, who easily releases the prisoners. Koschei, Baba Yaga and Vasilisa decide to take Ivan with them to find the Sword. Escaping the dungeon, they enlist Vodyanoy the Merman. Koschei tells Ivan of Vasilisa's backstory: after she caught the eye of Dobrynya, the jealous Varvara turned everyone in her village into frogs. Baba Yaga could alleviate the curse by helping her to occasionally turn back into human form. Despite bonding with Vasilisa, Ivan still wishes to get back to his own world.

Varvara eventually captures the protagonist, petrifies Vodyanoy and forces Ivan to get the Sword for her, holding his companions hostage. Ivan recovers the Sword and overpowers his foes, but Koshei turns out to be in league with Varvara. Moreover, Dobrynya turns out to be the mastermind, planning to use the Sword to become immortal like Koschei. Reasoning that he no longer needs his help, Dobrynya betrays Koschei, and Ivan uses the Sword to escape to Earth.

Back in Moscow, Ivan realizes he cannot abandon his beloved Vasilisa, and decides to get back. He finds the volkhv and returns to Belogorie. After setting free Zmey Gorynych he uses a modern handgun to fight his way to Dobrynya. However, the latter has already become immortal and prepares to execute Vasilisa and Baba Yaga. Using Gorynych as a distraction, Ivan challenges Dobrynya to a duel, hoping to give his companions time to destroy the magical stone and undo the Immortals' invulnerability. During the fight, Dobrynya reveals that it was his envy of Ilya that led to betrayal of Bogatyrs.

Koschei eventually gets his hands on the magical stone. Touched by the selfless heroism of his companion, he decides to shatter it, killing himself and Dobrynya. Varvara flees Belogorie, and her petrified victims come back to life. Among them was Ilya, who reunites with Ivan. Rather than return to the life of a fake "mage", Ivan stays in Belogorie and marries Vasilisa. He briefly comes to Earth to heal the comatose boy.

A mid-credit scene shows Varvara on Earth, meeting her mother Galina, Ivan's housekeeper. The two had planned to enthrall Dobrynya and rule Belogorye. That plan have failed, they will now have to make a different move.

== Cast ==
- Viktor Khorinyak as Ivan Ilyich Naydenov / Ivan the Fool, appears on the television screen in the role of magician and psychic Svetozar.
  - Igor Yashanin as Ivan Naydenov in childhood
- Mila Sivatskaya as Vasilisa the Wise, trying to destroy the spell that turned all her relatives into frogs, Vasilisa learned to fight in life.
- Konstantin Lavronenko as Koschei
- Elena Yakovleva as Baba Yaga, a witch living in a cabin on chicken legs.
  - Svetlana Kolpakova as young appearance of Baba Yaga
- Ekaterina Vilkova as Princess Varvara, an evil sorceress.
- Yevgeny Dyatlov as Dobrynya Nikitich, a fearless bogatyr who turned to evil. He is married to Varvara.
- Sergey Burunov as Vodyanoy, a merman, the lord of rivers, lakes and sea waters.
- Aleksandr Semchev as Chudo-Yudo, a monster that lives in the gorge.
- Yuriy Tsurilo as Ilya Muromets
- Wolfgang Cerny as Alyosha Popovich
- Timofey Tribuntsev as the white mage Svetozar, a volkhv
- Oleg Chevelyov as Varvara's guard
- Vladimir Ipatov as a boyar
- Andrey Trushin as a bogatyr, warrior
- Yelena Valyushkina as Galina, Ivan's housekeeper, Varvara's mother

=== English dubbing ===
The film was dubbed into English with the title The Last Warrior at the UK studio Pinewood Studio in 2017.

- Chris Kaye as Ivan Naydenov / Ivan the Fool
- Catherine Zeta-Jones as Varvara
- Kat Lozano as ?
- Mike Myers as Vodyanoy

== Production ==
=== Development ===
In May 2016, production began in Moscow and other locations. The premier was set for October 19, 2017, on the eve of school holidays with potential for being released in the IMAX format. The production companies applied to the Cinema Foundation for state support. Filming took place in Moscow and near Sochi. As of November 26, 2017, the film became the highest-grossing local-language release of all time in Russia, surpassing Stalingrad with 1.68 billion rubles ($28.8 million)

=== Casting ===
The main character of the film, Ivan Naydenov, performed by Viktor Khorinyak, was conceived as a more serious hero, although there was also something left of the character of Kostya Anisimov from the TV series Kitchen, for example, the ability to quickly find a way out of a difficult situation.

=== Filming ===
Principal photography took place in Moscow and near Sochi, and basically all the scenes were shot in real scenery, and not on a chroma key. Most of the filming took place in the Republic of Abkhazia. Abkhazian production company Alexandra Basariya (Sandro) Abkhaz-Production LLC hospitably received the film crew and beloved Russian actors. The shooting took place in such cities and areas as: the road to Lake Ritsa, Auadhara Nature Reserve, Alpine Meadows, the village of Otapi cave in Ochamchyrsky District, the town of Pitsunda, Gagra and Gudauta.

=== Post-production ===
According to the director, a watermark created by computer-generated imagery.

== Music ==
The Last Warrior (Original Motion Picture Soundtrack)

Soundtrack album by George Kallis
- Released: November 17, 2017
- Recorded: 2017
- Genre: Film soundtrack
- Languages: English, Russian
- Label: Walt Disney Records
- Director: Dmitriy Dyachenko

=== Track listing ===
No.	Title	Length
1.	"The Last Warrior"	3:43
2.	"The Boy and the Orphanage"	2:20
3.	"The Land of Belogoria"	1:50
4.	"Koschei, The Undead"	2:07
5.	"Baba Yaga, The Witch"	1:49
6.	"The Legend of the Magic Sword"	2:52
7.	"Vasilisa, The Frog Princess"	3:38
8.	"Battle with the Guards"	2:07
9.	"Ivan and Vasilissa"	3:15
10.	"The Hut on Chicken Legs"	2:10
11.	"Chased in the Woods"	1:49
12.	"Ivan Burns The Hut"	2:16
13.	"Merman, Lord of the Water"	3:00
14.	"The Journey Begins"	1:24
15.	"Varvara's Arrow"	1:33
16.	"Chudo-Yudo, The Ogre Cannibal"	1:34
17.	"Ivan's Story"	2:03
18.	"Evil Furry Rabbit"	1:11
19.	"Running Away"	1:18
20.	"Prisoners and the Old Sword"	1:30
21.	"The Magic Sword and the Crystal"	3:54
22.	"Back to Belagoria"	0:52
23.	"Little Dragon Zmey Gorynych"	2:11
24.	"Ivan shoots Dobrynya"	1:14
25.	"Ride of the Gorynych"	1:17
26.	"The Battle for the Crystal"	5:40
27.	"Ilya Muromets and Celebrations"	1:16
28.	"The Boy Opens His Eyes"	1:30
29.	"The Warriors Rise"	1:51
Total length:		63:14

== Release ==
The film is scheduled to be released in the Russian Federation on October 29, 2017, by Walt Disney Studios Sony Pictures Releasing (WDSSPR). The television premiere took place on January 1, 2018, on the Russia-1 TV channel.

== Reception ==
=== Budget ===
The exact budget for the movie is unknown but it's estimated to be somewhere between $6 and $8 million. In 2017 production company Yellow, Black and White (YBW) revealed that the overall production and promotion budget was 370 million Russian Rubles (~$8 million), equally distributed between Disney and YBW. The film is partially sponsored by Russian government through Cinema Fund, which gave 100 million Russian Rubles to YBW, although half of that sum was returned to state-owned Cinema Fund thanks to the movie's commercial success.

=== Box office ===
The Last Knight in less than two weeks of rental broke the bar of 1 billion rubles and became the highest-grossing domestic film of 2017, according to the Unified Automated Information System (UAIS) (this record was broken after a short time by the sports drama Going Vertical (2017 film), which earned at the box office 3 billion rubles). In total, The Last Knight collected more than 1.7 billion rubles at the box office, having recovered its budget in 11 days.

The reason for success is found both in a positive word of mouth, and in the active support of distributors.

=== Critical response ===
Critics' opinions about the film were divided, it received conflicting ratings - but mostly average, neutral. According to the "Criticism" aggregator, The Last Knight received an average rating of 67/100 in the press (based on 29 reviews). Igromania magazine stated that the film is straightforward and that the reason why the villains of fairy tales such as Koschey or Baba Yaga went over to the good side was not explained in the film, but he praised the film for good humor. Magazine "Mir Fantastiki" gave the film six out of ten stars and stated that the film could not escape the cliche with the main character, which could be ridiculed in Shrek fifteen years ago, because of which the film suffers from a lack of originality, and also stated that the reason why the villains save the world of fairy tales was not disclosed in the film. However, the magazine also praised the film for humor.

According to the results of a survey organized by the Kinopoisk website on the VKontakte social network, users called The Last Knight the best Russian film of 2017.

== Sequels ==
The Russian Disney office announced a sequel to the film in February 2018 with Yellow, Black and White co-production and Vitaliy Shlyappo leading the writers. The film is titled The Last Warrior: Root of Evil and was released on December 24, 2020. The third part, The Last Warrior: A Messenger of Darkness, was released in December 2021.

== See also ==
- The Last Warrior: Root of Evil (2020)
- The Last Warrior: A Messenger of Darkness (2021)
