= Ekaterina Vilkova =

Russian actress (born 1984)

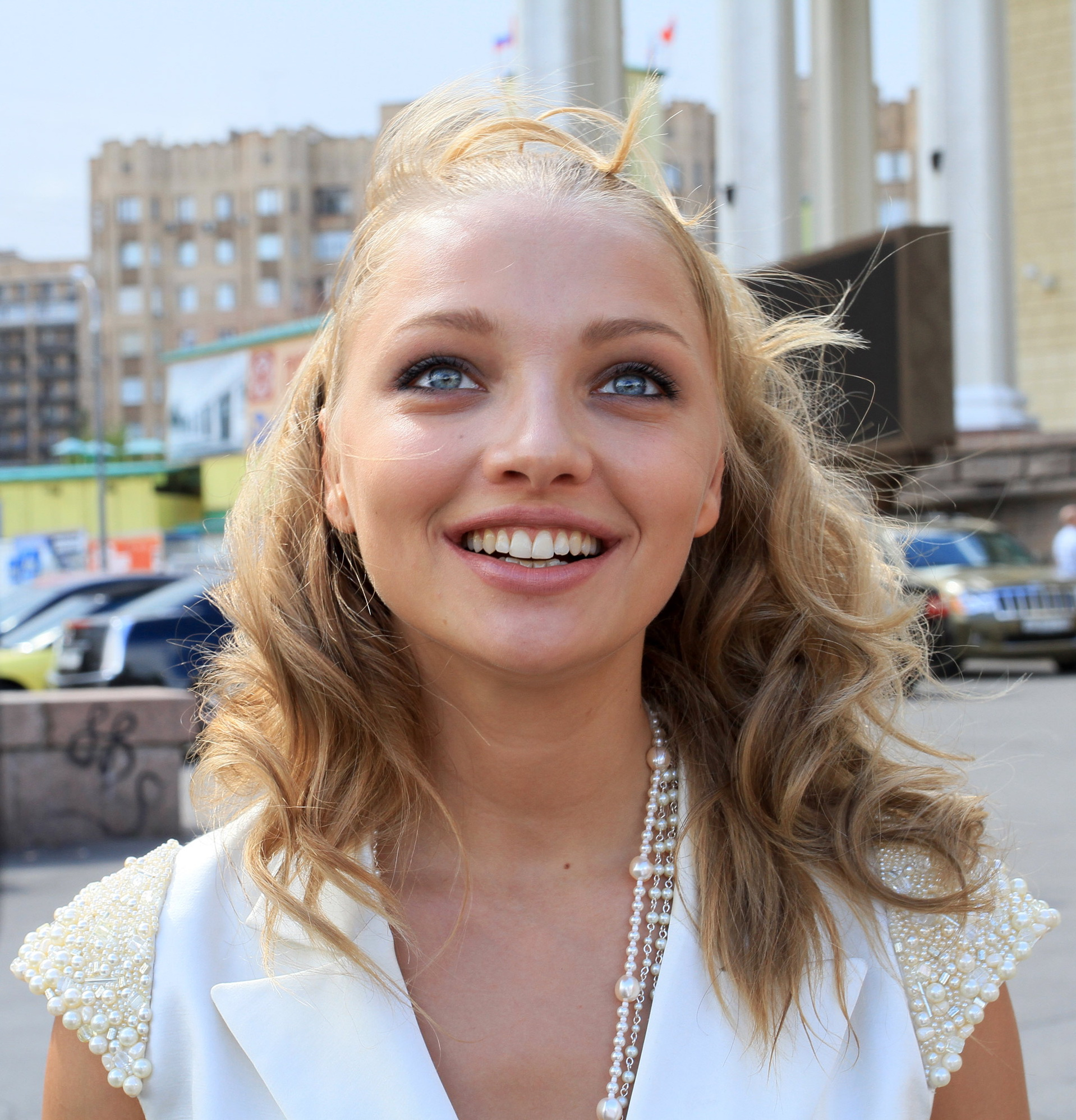
- in September 2010
- Born: 11 July 1984 (age 42); Gorky, USSR
- Occupation: Actress
- Years active: 2005–present
- Spouse: Ilya Lyubimov (m. 2011)
- Children: 2

Ekaterina Nikolaevna Vilkova (Russian: Екатери́на Никола́евна Вилко́ва; born 11 July 1984) is a Russian actress. She is known for her roles in Black Lightning (2009), Hipsters (2008), The PyraMMMid (2011), and Disney's The Last Bogatyr (2017) and its sequels.

== Early life ==
Was born on 11 July 1984 in Gorky (now called Nizhny Novgorod), which was then part of the USSR. In 2003, she graduated from the Nizhny Novgorod Theatre School. In 2006, she graduated from the Moscow Art Theatre School.

== Career ==
She appeared in the plays No Part from His Love by Alexander Volodin and She, Katya Kozlova directed by Viktor Ryzhakov.

From 2010 to 2011, she participated in the TV show Ice and Fire on Channel One.

In 2010, she starred in the video for the song "You Know" by Alexander Lominsky, and in 2012 she starred in the video for Dan Balan's song "Love".

== Personal life ==
On 1 May 2011, she married Russian actor Ilya Lyubimov. On 11 February 2012, she gave birth to a daughter named Pavla. On 6 April 2014, she gave birth to a son named Peter.

== Filmography ==
Year	Title	Russian name	Role	Notes
2005	Satisfaction	Сатисфакция	Sofya Golitsyna	Historical television series
2006	Main Caliber	Главный калибр	Anastasiya	Television series
2006	Demons	Бесы	Dasha	
2007	You'll Not Going to Catch Us	Нас не догонишь	Nasos	
2007	Pantera	Пантера	Masha	Television series
2007	Clamps	Тиски	Masha	
2007	Full Breath	Полное дыхание	Katya	
2008	He Who Puts Out the Light	Тот, кто гасит свет	Anna	
2008	Fathers and Sons	Отцы и дети	Fenechka	
2008	Stilyagi	Стиляги	Betsi	
2008	Kamenskaya 5	Каменская 5	Alina Baznis	She appeared in an episode at 5th season
2008	Zastava Zhilina	Застава Жилина	Elizaveta Savina	Television series
2008	The Book of Masters	Книга Мастеров	Mermaid	First Russian Disney film
2009	Black Lightning	Чёрная Молния	Nastya Svetlova	First Russian superhero film
2009	Heart Ask	Желание	Valentina	
2009	Proposed Conditions	Предлагаемые обстоятельства	Asya	Television series
2009	Palm Sunday	Вербное воскресенье	Pavla Kochetkova	Television series
2010	Six Degrees of Celebration	Ёлки	Alina	
2010	Supermanager or the Fate Stick	Суперменеджер, или Мотыга судьбы	Nastya	
2010	Samka	Самка	reporter Larisa Debomonova	
2010	Time Connection	Связь времён	Masha	
2011	The PyraMMMid	ПираМММида	Vera	
2011	On the Hook!	На крючке!	Margarita Nashaeva	
2011	Wedding Exchange	Свадьба по обмену	Sonya Olkhovskaya	
2011	Raider	Рейдер	Nastya	
2011	My Favorite Dolt	Мой любимый раздолбай	Marina	
2011	Furtseva	Фурцева	Svetlana	Television series
2011	What Men Talking About	О чём ещё говорят мужчины	Angela Viktorovna	
2012	The White Guard	Белая гвардия	Yulia Reiss	Television series
2012	Believe	Верю	Anya	Television series
2012	Gulf Stream under the Iceberg	Гольфстрим под айсбергом	Ivona	
2012	One, Two! Love You!	Раз, два! Люблю тебя!	Marina	Miniseries
2012	Happy New Year, Mom!	С новым годом, мамы!	Masha	
2013	Some Like It Cold	В спорте только девушки	Svetlana	
2013	Fighters	Истребители	Lydia Litovchenko	Television series
2013	Kukushechka	Кукушечка		Television series
2013	The Three Musketeers	Три мушкетёра	Milady	Film and miniseries
2013	Kill Stalin	Убить Сталина	Polina Serebryakova	Television series
2014	Friends of Friends	Друзья друзей		
2014	Capsule	Капсула	Medusa	Short film
2014	Kuprin	Куприн	Shurochka	Television series
2014	Sky Fallen	Небо падших	Katya	
2015	The Dawns Here Are Quiet	А зори здесь тихие	Starshiy Serzhant Kiryanova	
2016	Schoolmates	Одноклассницы	Sveta	
2016	Next to Us	Рядом с нами	Irinna Petrovna	
2016	Hotel Eleon	Отель Элеон	Sofiya Tolstaya	Television series
2016	Doctor Richter	Доктор Рихтер		Television series
2017	Last Knight	Последний богатырь	Varvara	Walt Disney Pictures
2020	Just Imagine Things We Know	Просто представь что мы знаем	Katya	Television series
2021	The Last Minister	Последний министр	Z	Television series
2021	Vertinsky	Вертинский	Bubi	Television series
