= The Walt Disney Company CIS =

Russian subsidiary of The Walt Disney Company

The Walt Disney Company CIS, LLC
- Type: Subsidiary
- Traded as: Disney Russia
- Industry: Media conglomerate
- Founded: 2006; 20 years ago
- Defunct: 2022; 4 years ago
- Fate: Closed, operations outside Russia and Belarus taken over by The Walt Disney Company EMEA
- Headquarters: Moscow, Russia
- Area served: Russia; CIS; Georgia; Mongolia
- Parent: The Walt Disney Company EMEA
- Divisions: The Walt Disney Studios CIS

The Walt Disney Company CIS, LLC (also known as Disney Russia) is a Russian subsidiary of The Walt Disney Company, engaged in the production of films, television content, and also acts as a distribution through Walt Disney Studios.

== History ==
In 1930, the cartoon "Dance of the Skeletons" was first shown in the USSR.

In 1965 in the out-of-competition programme of the IV Moscow International Film Festival was shown the film "Mary Poppins", which won popularity among the audience.

In 1968, Art Publishing published Edgar Arnoldi's The Life and Tales of Walt Disney, which was a success among readers.

On January 1, 1991, the cartoon series "Duck Tales" and "Chip and Dale: Rescue Rangers" premiered on the TV channel "First Programme of the Central Theatre".

The Walt Disney Company CIS was incorporated in 2005 and opened in 2006. The company is engaged in licensing of consumer goods in Russia, the CIS countries, Georgia and Mongolia.

On 10 March 2022, it was announced that it would suspend operations due to the invasion of Ukraine. In October of the same year, Disney removed its Russian websites and social media accounts, and Russia disappeared from the list of countries where the company has a branch.

In November, the company announced the temporary closure of its film distribution division in Russia, and on 14 December of the same year, Disney Channel ceased broadcasting.

== Divisions ==
- Radio Disney Russia (2013–2022)
- Fox Networks Group Russia (Baby TV, FX, FX Life, National Geographic, National Geographic Wild)
- Disney Channel Russia (2010–2022)
- The Walt Disney Studios CIS (distribution; currently halted due to the Russian invasion of Ukraine)

== Closed divisions ==
- Jetix (CIS)
- Jetix Play
- Walt Disney Studios Sony Pictures Releasing CIS (WDSSPR CIS) (2007–2020, with partnership from Sony Pictures Entertainment)

== Filmography ==
The first feature film produced by Disney Russia was The Book of Masters released in 2009. Disney Russia planned to make two new films in the summer of 2011, but after the lackluster financial results of The Book of Masters Disney Russia abandoned those plans. The next feature film from Disney Russia was The Last Warrior released in 2017.

Feature films

- The Book of Masters (2009)
- The Last Warrior (2017)
- The Last Warrior: Root of Evil (2020)
- The Last Warrior: A Messenger of Darkness (2021)

TV and short films

- As the Bell Rings, TV series (2010–2012)
- After School, TV series (2012)
- Rules of Style, fashion show (2013–2019)
- That's My Room!, home renovation show (2015–2017)
- Happiness is..., collection of short films (2015)
- Best Friends, game show (2018)
- Happiness Is... Part 2, collection of short films (2019)

== See also ==
- The Walt Disney Company Italy
- The Walt Disney Company India
- The Walt Disney Company France
