= The Book of Masters =

2009 Russian film

Книга Мастеров
- Theatrical release poster
- Directed by: Vadim Sokolovsky
- Written by: Vadim Sokolovsky, Anna Starobinets
- Based on: Russian fairy tales
- Produced by: Leonid Vereshchagin, Marina Zhigalov-Ozkan
- Cinematography: Archil Akhvlediani
- Music by: Yuri Poteyenko
- Production companies: Walt Disney Pictures CIS; Trite; Yellow, Black and White
- Distributed by: Walt Disney Studios Sony Pictures Releasing CIS
- Release date: October 29, 2009
- Running time: 101 minutes
- Country: Russia
- Language: Russian
- Budget: $8 million (₽350 million)
- Box office: $11.3 million

Книга Мастеров (English: The Book of Masters) is a 2009 Russian fantasy film produced by the CIS division of The Walt Disney Company and directed by Vadim Sokolovsky. It was released in Russia on October 29, 2009. The story is based on Russian fairy tales, such as "The Stone Flower" and other stories from The Malachite Casket collection. It is Disney's first film made in Russia.

== Plot ==
A beautiful and kind girl, daughter of Baba Yaga, finds a magical stone Alatyr (mythology) while walking in a field. It transforms her heart into a stone and puts her under a strange curse. She is to be the evil Countess of Stones and live in a stone tower. If the greatest gem-cutter in the world brings the stone of Alatyr to life, though, she'll become the ruler of the world.

The Stone Countess, now cruel and selfish, is fascinated with the idea. She starts searching for the best gem-cutters and forces them to work with Alatyr, so the magical stone would become a living thing. Neither of the gem-cutters succeeds, so she kills them. While being imprisoned in her tower, they work on a large book about the secrets of gem-cutting. Each of them edits the book, so it's later named "the Book of Masters".

Meanwhile, the Countess creates a talking magic mirror, whom she treats like a soulless thing. She also makes a large army of stone soldiers - the Ardars. She often sends them to terrorize common people and to capture some of them to feed Baba Yaga, who's mostly a cannibal.

The plot develops, picturing a young orphan Ivan, who lives in an ordinary village but dreams of becoming the world's best gem-cutter. His father had actually been kidnapped by the Stone Countess, and Ivan also secretly plans to avenge it.

One day, he makes a sculpture of his landlord's daughter Clava, showing her fatness and ugliness in a grotesque way. The landlord, who adores his daughter, orders Ivan to be punished severely. The execution doesn't even start before the village faces another attack of the Ardars, who capture Ivan and Clava and bring them to Baba Yaga.

Baba Yaga goes to feed the Ardars, and Ivan and Clava are unexpectedly freed by a lovely young girl, who calls herself Katia, the Stone Countess's daughter. Clava takes the chance to run away from Baba Yaga's house, but Ivan is caught by Baba Yaga. She attempts to make a soup of him but is distracted again by Iangul, the Ardars' commander, who comes again to see Katia. Baba Yaga disapproves of it, so she goes to send him away.

Katia hides Ivan and, when Iangul leaves and Baba Yaga goes to sleep, she shows Ivan a passageway to the stone tower. One can enter it through a well if the Stone Countess allows. Ivan tells Katia of his dream to become a professional gem-cutter and avenge his father's death. So Katia gives him the Book of Masters to study but warns him about her mother's evil power.

Ivan studies the Book for a year. He has fallen for Katia and misses her terribly. But the fat landlady Clava wants to marry him, being sure that he's her rescuer. Moreover, the Stone Countess orders Katia to marry Iangul (who genuinely loves the girl). As for Ivan's ugly fiancee, she also has an admirer - Ivan's friend Cusma, a blacksmith.

Finally, Ivan finishes studying the Book and goes to the stone tower. The Countess promises him Katia's hand in exchange for bringing Alatyr to life. Ivan believes her and soon carves the stone into a perfect shape of a red rose, and it becomes alive.

But the Countess has tricked him. He sees Katia in a dream, and she tells him they'll never be together. Furious, Ivan runs to the forest where Baba Yaga lives to ask her for help. The Ardars are sent to kill him, but Cusma distracts them and they kill him instead.

Searching for Baba Yaga's house, Ivan meets a helpful talking horse, frees a captured mermaid and helps a bored bogatyr. Finally he finds Baba Yaga, who tells him about magical diamonds able to cancel Alatyr's black powers. Also she gives him a bottle with the water of life, and Ivan revives Cusma.

Then Baba Yaga's magic transport him to Koschei the Deathless, who is the owner of the magical diamonds. First Koschei refuses to give them to Ivan, but he is convinced to do this by his fiancee, the mermaid rescued by Ivan. So Ivan takes the diamonds and hurries to the tower, where Katia's soul is being given to Alatyr in order to make the stone fully alive.

Ivan saves Katia and steals Alatyr just in time, and they rush to the passageway to the non-magical world. They are stopped by Iangul, who still hopes that Katia will be his wife. Katia's sure Iangul is going to kill Ivan, so she offers herself in exchange for Ivan's life. Realizing that Katia doesn't love him, Iangul lets both of them run away. The Stone Countess turns him into a stone when she finds out.

But when the Countess catches Ivan and orders him to give her Alatyr back, Ivan is no longer afraid of her. He adorns Alatyr with the magical diamonds, and they break the spell that kept the Countess evil. So she's kind and sweet again and happily allows Katia to marry Ivan. The landlady Clava turns sad, because she wants to marry someone too. Her father says that he'll give her to anyone, and Cusma at last declares his love for Clava.

The two couples are wedded and live happily ever after.

== Cast ==
- Mariya Andreyeva as Katya
- Maxim Loktionov as Ivan
- Irina Apeksimova as the Stone Countess
- Artur Smolyaninov as Iangul
- Valentin Gaft as the magic mirror
- Leonid Kuravlyov as the landlord
- Olga Yergina as Clava
- Alexander Lenkov as the village's senior gem-cutter
- Liya Akhedzhakova as Baba Yaga
- Nikolay Yefremov as Cusma
- Mikhail Yefremov as the bogatyr
- Sergey Garmash as the talking horse
- Yekaterina Vilkova as the mermaid
- Gosha Kutsenko as Koschei
- Olga Aroseva as the story-teller
