= Kitchen (TV series) =

Russian sitcom

- Genre: comedy; sitcom
- Created by: Vitaliy Shliappo; Vasily Kutsenko; Igor Tudvasev; Dmitry Yan; Pavel Danilov
- Written by: Vitaliy Shliappo; Vasily Kutsenko; Igor Tudvasev; Pavel Danilov; Dimitri Yan; Zhannat Kerimbayev; Vadim Komissaruk; Oleg Mastich; Tatyana Goncharova; Aslan Gugkaev; Aslan Sokurov; Garri Gupalenko; Konstantin Ivanov; Anatoly Molchanov; Vyacheslav Zubov; Andrey Ageev; Alexey Lebedev; Alexey Zuenok; Dmitry Krepchuk; Roman Angelin; Alexander Danilov
- Directed by: Dmitry Dyachenko; Zhora Kryzhovnikov; Anton Fedotov
- Starring: Dmitry Nazarov; Mark Bogatyryov; Elena Podkaminskaya; Dmitry Nagiyev; Marina Mogilevskaya; Viktor Khorinyak; Olga Kuzmina; Sergey Epishev; Sergey Lavygin; Mikhail Tarabukin; Nikita Tarasov; Valeriya Fedorovich; Mikhail Bashkatov; Igor Vernik; Grigory Siyatvinda; Yelena Ksenofontova; Filipp Bledny
- Composer: Ivan Kanayev
- Country of origin: Russia
- Original language: Russian
- No. of seasons: 6
- No. of episodes: 120

Production
- Executive producers: Vyacheslav Murugov; Eduard Iloyan; Vitaly Shlyappo; Alexey Trotsyuk; Denis Zhalinsky; Vasily Kutsenko; Aslan Gugkaev; Dmitry Dyachenko; Alexander Rubtsov; Alexey Volkov; Igor Poptsov; Zhannat Kerimbayev
- Cinematography: Sergey Dyshuk; Denis Panov; Mikhail Selikhov; Evgeny Kolskiy
- Running time: 25 minutes
- Production company: Yellow, Black and White

Original release
- Network: STS
- Release: October 22, 2012 – March 31, 2016

Kitchen (Russian: Кухня, romanized: Kukhnya) is a Russian sitcom, broadcast on STS from 2012 to 2016. The show focuses on the comedic events that unfold in a fictional restaurant in Moscow called Claude Monet. Since season 5, the events unfold in the Victor restaurant of the Eleon boutique hotel.

== Plot ==
The show is set in Moscow and focuses on the young and enthusiastic Maxim "Max" Lavrov, who dreams of becoming a renowned chef. After graduating from a culinary college in his hometown of Voronezh and completing his army service, he applies for a job at Claude Monet, one of Moscow's most expensive restaurants, owned by the famous Russian actor and TV host Dmitry Nagiyev. The show also features other characters, such as Max's best friend and bartender Konstantin, his love interest (and later wife) Viktoria, and his boss Viktor Barinov, the head chef of Claude Monet.

== Cast ==
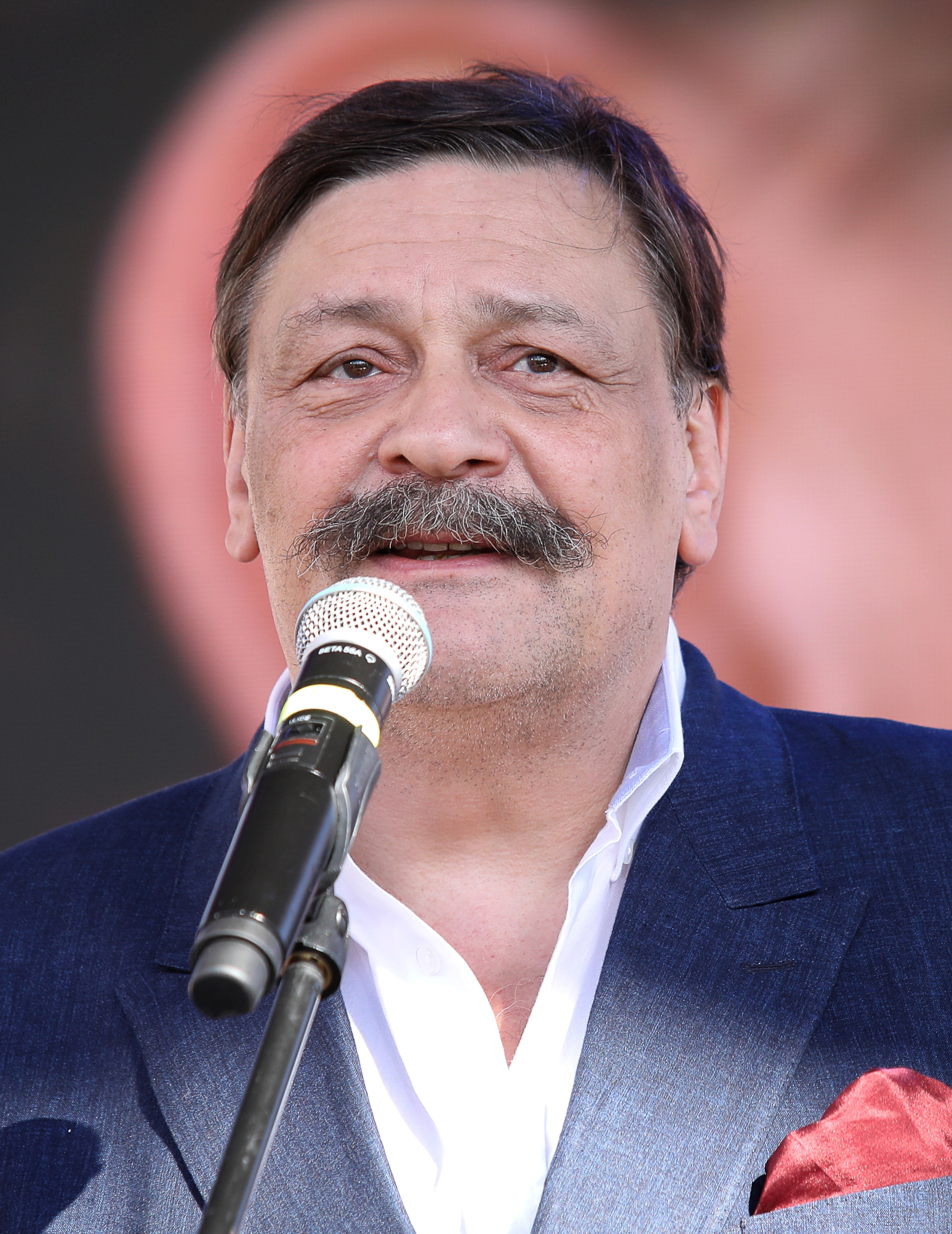
Dmitry Nazarov (Viktor Barinov)

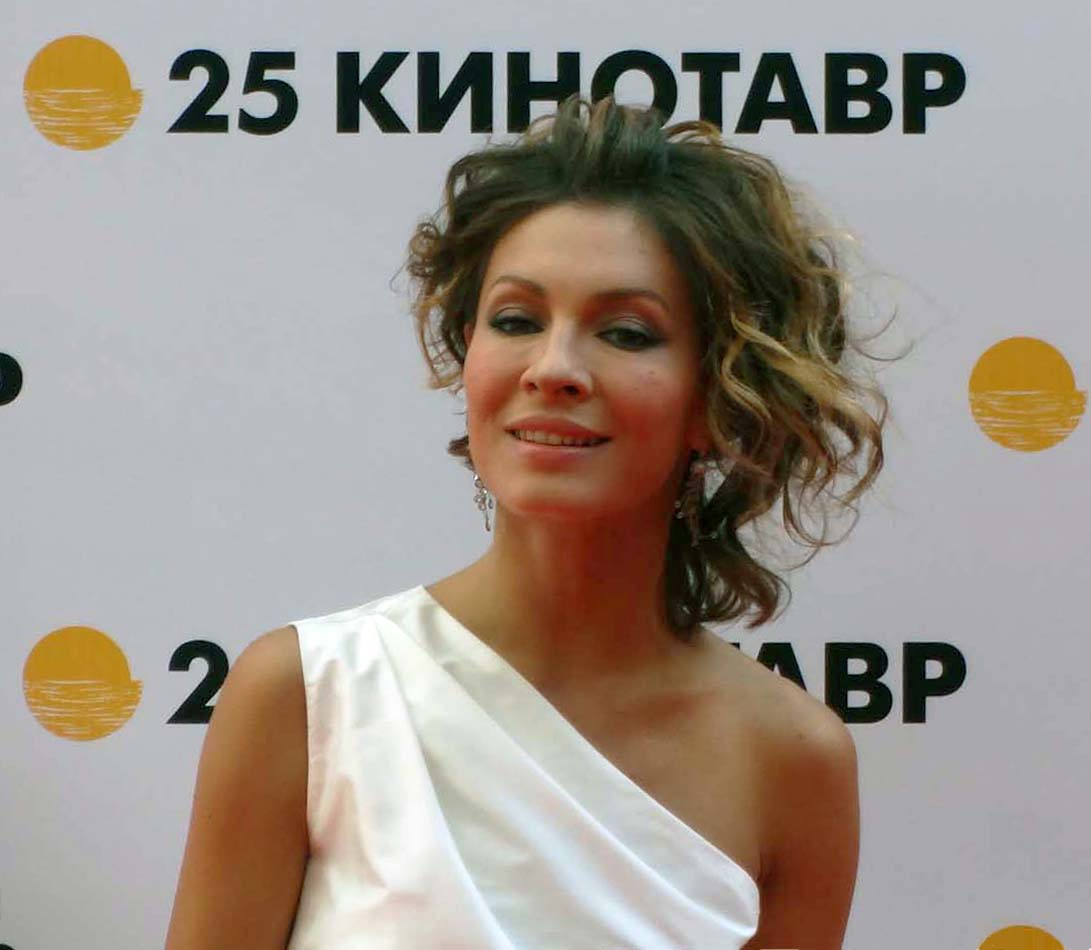
Yelena Podkaminskaya (Vika Goncharova)

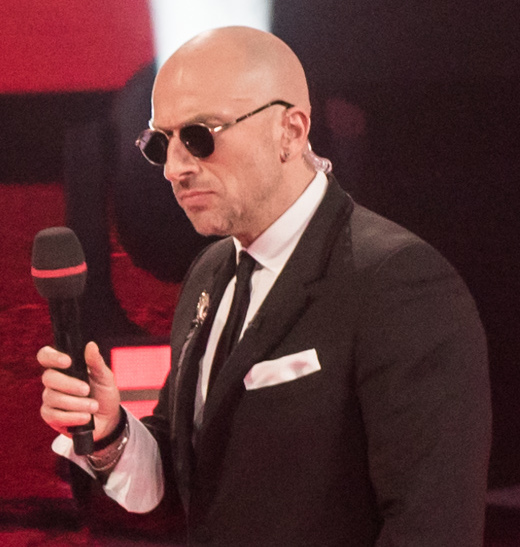
Dmitry Nagiyev (Dmitry Nagiyev)

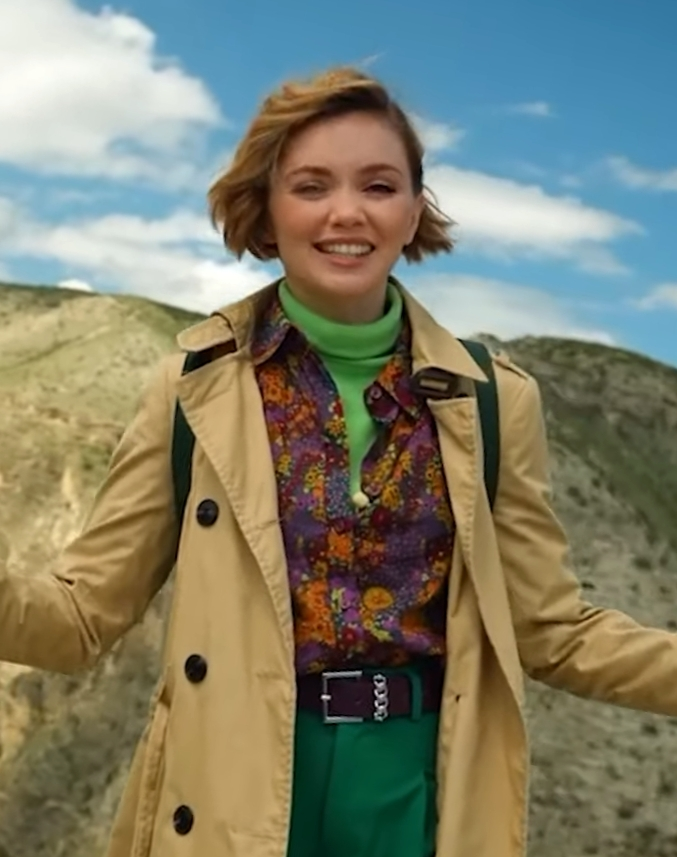
Olga Kuzmina (Nastya Fomina)

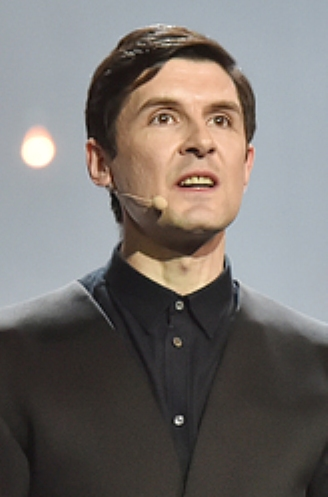
Sergey Epishev (Lyova Solovyov)

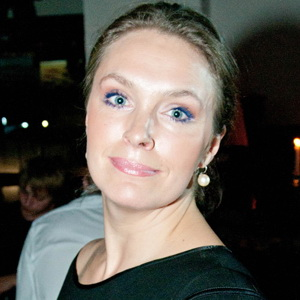
Marina Mogilevskaya (Elena Sokolova)

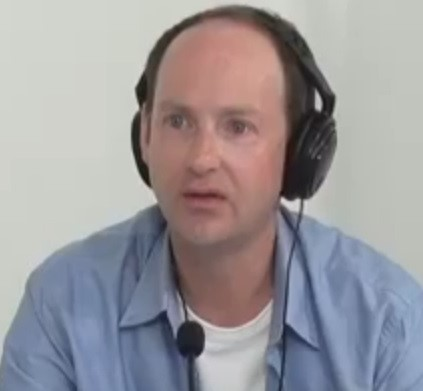
Nikita Tarasov (Louis Benoît)

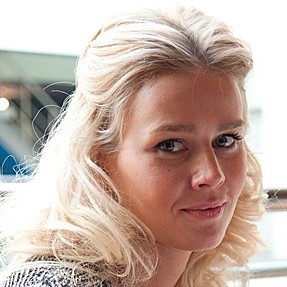
Ekaterina Kuznetsova (Sasha Bubnova)

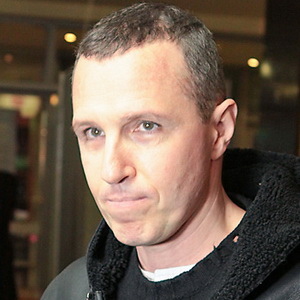
Igor Vernik (Herman Land)

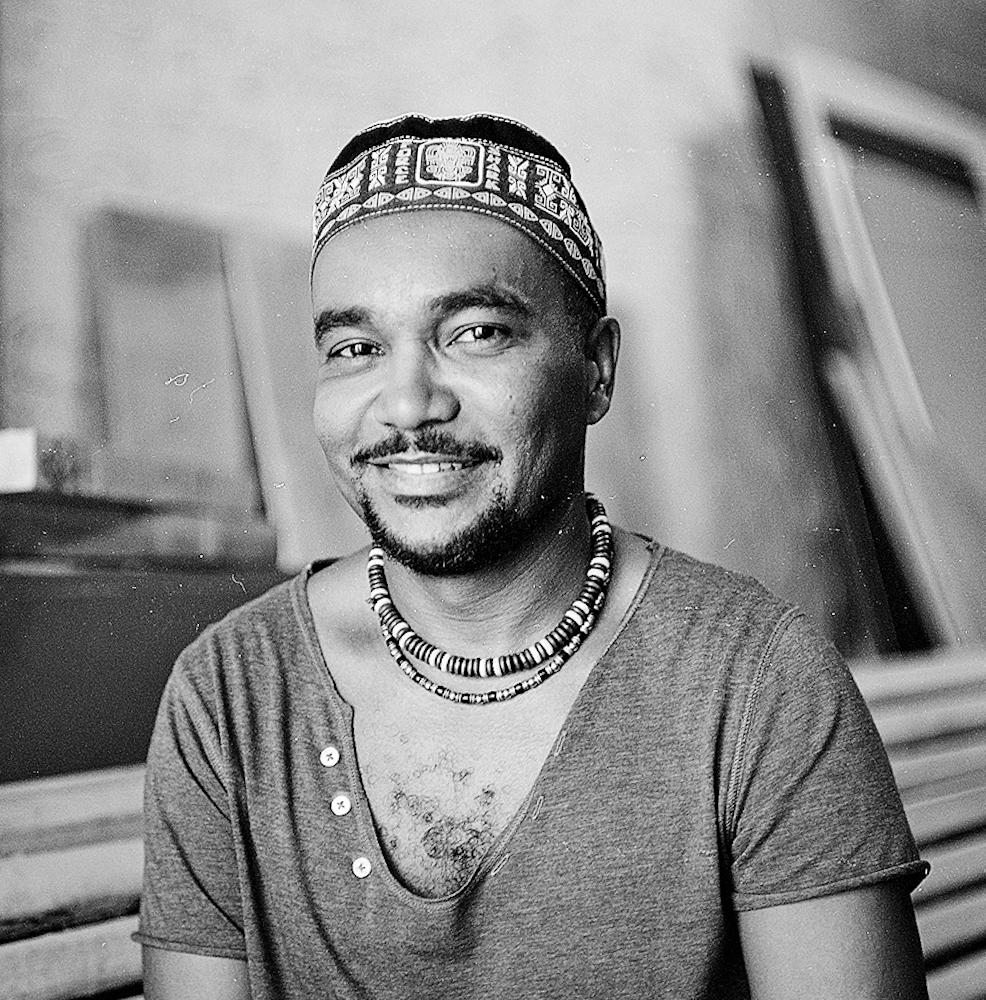
Grigory Siyatvinda (Mikhail Jackovich)

=== Since Season 1 ===
- Maxim "Max" Lavrov (Mark Bogatyryov) is the protagonist of the series. He is an enthusiastic young man who has moved from Voronezh to Moscow to pursue his dream of becoming a chef. Max is highly charismatic and easily charms women. He is resourceful and inventive, yet also frivolous and weak-willed, so he often finds himself in difficult situations. At work, his colleagues call him by various nicknames: "Rookie" (used by his boss), "Appendix" (from Senya and Fedya), and "Pencil" (from Sasha).
- Viktor Barinov (Dmitry Nazarov) is the head chef of the restaurant Claude Monet and later Victor. He is a highly skilled chef with several years of experience in Paris. However, he has a terrible temper and is generally rude to everyone, especially Max. He also struggles with alcoholism and ludomania. A huge fan of the football club Spartak Moscow, Barinov has been divorced three times and has two daughters from different marriages. Since Season 2, he has been dating Elena Sokolova, the head chef of a rival restaurant.
- Viktoria "Vika" Goncharova (Yelena Podkaminskaya) is the director of the restaurant Claude Monet and, later, Victor. She is a strong, independent woman, as well as a talented manager. Vika has been Max's girlfriend since Season 1, although their relationship has been on and off. She married Max during The Kitchen in Paris special, but they divorced in Season 5. She originally came to Moscow from Kaliningrad.
- Dmitry Nagiyev (Dmitry Nagiyev) is the owner of Claude Monet and later co-owner of the Eleon hotel. He is a popular Russian actor and TV host. He is a friend of Viktor's and often turns a blind eye to his bad temper and drunken antics. However, he fired Viktor after he criticized Nagiyev on television. Throughout the show, he was married twice: first to Kristina, who used to work at "Claude Monet" as a promotional model, and then to Eleonora, the co-owner of "Eleon". He also had a platonic relationship with Vika during Season 3.
- Konstantin "Kostya" Anisimov (Viktor Khorinyak) is the bartender and later sommelier at the restaurants Claude Monet and, later, Victor. He is Max's best friend. Kostya is a simple, good-natured guy who doesn't know how to lie. Despite being quite attractive, he has difficulty communicating with women. Since Season 1, he has been dating the waitress Nastya, and he married her in Season 3. He moved to Moscow from Krasnoyarsk.
- Anastasia "Nastya" Fomina (Olga Kuzmina) is a waitress at the restaurants Claude Monet and, later, Victor. She is a vegetarian, an animal rights activist, and she volunteers to help homeless people. Despite being somewhat naive, sentimental, and romantic, she ultimately reveals herself as the strong matriarch of her family. Nastya was in love with Max in the first episodes but later started dating Kostya. She married him in Season 3 and gave birth to their son, Stepan. She moved to Moscow from Podolsk.
- Lev "Lyova" Solovyov (Sergey Epishev) is the sous-chef at the restaurants Claude Monet and, later, Victor. He is a polite man and a real pedant who stutters. Lyova is Viktor's best friend and right-hand man. When Viktor left his apartment to his ex-wife and had nowhere to live, the sous-chef took him in. Since then, Viktor has lived with Lyova and his mother. He is a native Muscovite of German descent.
- Arseniy "Senya" Chuganin (Sergey Lavygin) is a chef specializing in meat at the restaurants Claude Monet and, later, Victor. He has kleptomania and often steals food from the kitchen. Along with his best friend Fedya, he is known for constantly playing pranks on his fellow chefs during working hours. He moved to Moscow from Smolensk.
- Fedor "Fedya" Yurchenko (Mikhail Tarabukin) is a chef specializing in fish at the restaurants Claude Monet and, later, Victor. For a long time, he lied about having worked as a ship's cook, concealing the fact that he actually suffers from seasickness. Together with Senya, Fedya is the kitchen's main prankster. According to his forged documents, he is a citizen of Moldova, but he is actually from Vladivostok. During a polygraph test taken by all the chefs, it was revealed that "Fedor" was not his real name and that he may have once murdered a man.
- Louis Benoît (Nikita Tarasov) is the pastry chef at the restaurants Claude Monet and, later, Victor. He is gay and often chats on his mobile phone, frequently arguing with his lovers back in France. However, in Season 6, after a breakup with another boyfriend, he has a one-night stand with a woman. He moved to Moscow from Provence.
- Alexandra "Sasha" Bubnova (Ekaterina Kuznetsova) is a waitress at the restaurant "Claude Monet". She is the biggest gossip girl in the restaurant. Sasha was Max's girlfriend during Season 2 but cheated on him with her ex-boyfriend, Ilya. She is from Kharkiv and moved to Moscow.
- Elena Sokolova (Marina Mogilevskaya) is the head chef of the rival restaurant Arcobaleno and later becomes an author and restaurant critic. She lived and worked in India for a long time. Despite a rocky start and initial rivalry with Viktor, they soon developed feelings for each other and began dating. Elena married Viktor in Season 6.
- Ainura Kenensarova (Zhanyl Asanbekova) works as a janitor at the restaurants Claude Monet and, later, Victor. She is a Kyrgyz immigrant who has been working in Russia without a legal work permit for many years. Ainura moved to Moscow from Bishkek.
- Kristina Nagiyeva (Maria Gorban) is a former promotional model for the restaurant Claude Monet who married Nagiyev shortly before the start of the show. She became the co-owner of the restaurant in Season 2. In Episode 56, she was appointed director but left immediately after stealing all of Nagiyev's money from the safe. This act put the restaurant at risk of bankruptcy. She is from Dniprodzerzhynsk.
- Rodion Sergeyevich (Konstantin Chepurin) is a bum who lives in the backyard of the restaurant Claude Monet and is on friendly terms with the staff. He is an intellectual and a great connoisseur of French cuisine, who also turns out to possess considerable cooking skills. In Season 3, it is revealed that he is, in fact, a prominent businessman from St. Petersburg who suffered from amnesia and had been missing for three years.
- Timur (Elberd Agayev) is a supplier for Claude Monet, Arcobaleno, and, later, Victor. He is an old acquaintance of Viktor's and is able to supply anything, even illegal goods.
- Angelina Smirnova (Elena Chernyavskaya) is a promotional model for the restaurant Claude Monet.
- Vera Solovyova (Lyudmila Maksakova) is Lyova's mother and a retired cardiologist.
- Tatyana Goncharova (Yulia Takshina) is Viktor's ex-wife and Vika's sister.

=== Since Season 2 ===
- Stepan Fomin (Aleksandr Ilyin) is Nastya's father and the owner of a sausage factory in the Moscow Oblast. He served a prison sentence in the 1990s. He loves his daughter very much despite all their differences and tries to help her financially, although Nastya doesn't accept money "made with blood".
- Ilya (Andrey Burkovsky) is a waiter at the restaurant Claude Monet, where he had also worked before the start of the show. He is Sasha's ex-boyfriend and Max's rival during Season 2. He tried to get Max fired, which accidentally led to Sasha being fired. Ilya was fired by Nagiyev in Season 3. He moved to Moscow from Novosibirsk.

=== Since Season 3 ===
- Ekaterina "Katya" Semyonova (Valeriya Fedorovich) is a chef specializing in molecular gastronomy at the restaurants Claude Monet and, later, Victor. She is the daughter of Viktor and Eleonora and uses her mother's maiden name. Katya studied molecular gastronomy in France but was expelled from the culinary academy. A defiant and confident young woman, she is also a member of a biker gang. Viktor was reluctant to hire his daughter, but she was hired by Nagiyev. She was in love with Max, but they remained friends. She has been dating Denis and later Nikita, trying to figure out who she truly loves.
- Eva Beletskaya (Irina Temicheva) is a waitress at the restaurant Claude Monet. She once had sex with Viktor and later lied to him about being pregnant. The deception was uncovered but had no significant consequences.

=== Since Season 4 ===
- Denis "Den" Krylov (Mikhail Bashkatov) is Max's childhood friend. Unlike Max, he is naive and kind-hearted. He is a talented musician but had to work as a waiter and chef before being appointed as the pianist at Claude Monet and, later, Victor. Like Viktor, he is an avid fan of Spartak Moscow. He dated Katya in Seasons 5 and 6.
- Herman Land (Igor Vernik) becomes the head chef of Claude Monet after Viktor is fired by Nagiyev. He is a keen boxer. In every restaurant where he has worked, he made a point of identifying a snitch among the staff. However, when he tried to do the same at Claude Monet, he failed. Herman persistently courted Vika, but she rejected him. It was later revealed that he has uncontrollable bouts of rage, which forced him to constantly take sedatives. This ultimately led to his dismissal. Due to his anger issues, he was blacklisted from working in the culinary industry in Latvia.
- Marina Chuganina (Anna Begunova) is Senya's wife and an accountant.

=== Since Season 5 ===
- Mikhail Jackovich (Grigory Siyatvinda) is the manager of the Eleon boutique hotel. He is a fan of PFC CSKA Moscow, which fuels his feud with Viktor. Like the head chef, he is an alcoholic and a gambling addict; however, he manages to behave much more professionally. He started his career in the hotel business as a doorman. Mikhail was secretly in love with Eleonora until he discovered that he was nothing more than a servant to her.
- Eleonora Galanova (Yelena Ksenofontova) is the owner of the Eleon boutique hotel. She is the mother of Katya and ex-wife of Viktor. Eleonora is quite popular with men. Her third husband died between Seasons 4 and 5, leaving her his hotel chain. She has a strained relationship with Katya and is trying in every way to improve it. However, she constantly tries to influence her daughter's personal life and even use it for her own gain. Eleonora married Nagiyev in Season 6 but later divorced him after discovering his affair with Kristina. At the end of Season 6, she starts dating Rodion.
- Nikita Dyagilev (Filipp Bledny) is a waiter and later the director at the restaurant Victor. He is the son of a billionaire who decided to work as a waiter to gain independence from his father. Eleonora, seeing an opportunity for her own benefit, tried to set him up with Katya. He secretly appreciated Eleonora's extensive help in developing his relationship with Katya.
- Gulnara (Feruza Ruzieva) is a janitor at the restaurant Victor. She is Ainura's niece, who also came to Moscow from Kyrgyzstan. She started dating Lyova but suddenly returned to Bishkek, which caused Lyova to reject the head chef position and move to Kyrgyzstan.
- Egor (Timur Yeremeyev) is the concierge in the Eleon boutique hotel.
- Svetlana "Sveta" Alexeyeva (Rina Grishina) is the concierge in the Eleon boutique hotel and Den's temporary girlfriend.
- Yaroslav and Pavel (Daniil and Pavel Rassomakhin) are the twin bellboys in the Eleon boutique hotel.

=== Since Season 6 ===
- Timofey Ilyich (Viktor Bychkov) is Kostya's biological father and a cardsharper. Nastya found him and tried to reconcile him with his son.

=== Notable guests ===
- Pyotr Lanovsky (Sergey Burunov) is a Federal Migration Service officer, known as the "Migrant Hunter" (a reference to Hans Landa from Inglourious Basterds) (Episode 16).
- Jael Kopas (Irina Brazgovka) is an elite film director from Romania (Episode 39).
- Old man Kirill (Sergey Sosnovsky) is an unfriendly retired KGB officer who lives on the floor above the restaurant (Episodes 52, 56).
- David Mikhailovich (Mark Rudinstein) is "the meat oligarch," who lost to Viktor at the casino (Episode 87).
- Lyubov Lavrova (Kira Kreylis-Petrova) is Max's grandmother (Episode 91).
- Gennady Sokolov (Vladimir Simonov) is Elena's ex-husband and an alcoholic painter (Episode 95).
- Elizaveta Genrikhovna (Valentina Talyzina) is the deceased mother of Eleonora and Viktor's former mother-in-law (in fact, a hallucination of Viktor's) (Episodes 101, 117).
- Daniil Alyokhin (Vladimir Sterzhakov) is Eleonora's business partner and Kristina's new husband (Episodes 101, 102, 118).
- Valentin Barinov (Aleksandr Pankratov-Chyorny) is Viktor's older brother who lives in the US, where he owns a network of oyster farms (Episode 111).
- Anton Vladimirovich (Aleksandr Yatsko) is the new head chef of the Victor restaurant, who replaced Viktor during the latter's hospitalization (Episode 119).

=== Cameos ===
- Bianka (episode 19)
- Vyacheslav Malafeev (episode 25)
- Iosif Prigozhin (episode 89)
- Leonid Agutin (episode 92)
- Georgy Cherdantsev (episode 94)

== Production ==
The filming began in July 2012. The show became one of the most expensive TV series in Russia, with a budget of US$200,000 per episode (about $8 million per season). The first episode aired on STS Channel on October 22, 2012, at 21:00.

The second season began filming on November 1, 2012, and was aired on March 25, 2013.

In summer 2013, filming for the third season began. In September 2013, the production team filmed a feature-length film named The Kitchen in Paris. The movie premiered in cinemas on May 1, 2014, while the third season began airing on March 3, 2014, following the airing of a documentary film The Kitchen's Kitchen (A film about the film) on STS on March 2.

At the end of April 2014, filming for the fourth season began, and the first episode was aired on October 13, 2014.

From January 26 to April 30, 2015, season 5 was filmed. It premiered on September 7, 2015.

From June 25 through til October 15, 2015, season 6 was filmed. It was announced as the final season. It premiered on February 29, 2016.

The show officially finished all filming on October 15, 2015. Fans, knowing about the ending of the show, created a site in support of recommencing filming. On the site, more than 1 million signatures were collected by January 2016. The ending of the show was connected with the completion of the plot line for the main characters.

On May 27, 2014, work began on a new full-length film called The Kitchen: The Last Battle. In June 2015, official preparation for filming began. The filming took place from September 17, 2016, through till February 2017. It premiered in cinemas on April 20, 2017.

From July 4 to September 23, 2016, a spin-off show was filmed called Hotel Eleon. It premiered on STS on November 28, 2016. The Director, Anton Fedotov, also directed the final 3 seasons of The Kitchen. The new show also included some of the characters from The Kitchen (For example, Senya and Marina, Kostya and Nastya, Michail Jekovich, Eleonora Andreevna, Kristina, Nikita, as well as a number of secondary actors. Likewise, in the second season there are appearances from Louis Benoît, Ekaterina Semyonova, Rodion Sergeevich and Ainura Kenensarova).

== Films and spin-offs ==
- "The Kitchen in Paris" (2014) first feature film
- "Hotel Eleon" (2016-2017) sitcom, spin-off of the series The Kitchen
- "The Kitchen: Animated Series" (2016) animated version of the first season
- "The Kitchen. The Last Battle" (2017) second feature film
- "The Kitchen on departure" (2017) two-part play, based on the series The Kitchen
- "Grand" (2018-2021) sitcom, spin-off of the series The Kitchen and Hotel Eleon
- "#SenyaFedya" (2018–2022) sketch comedy, spin-off of the series The Kitchen and Hotel Eleon
- "The Kitchen. War for the Hotel" (2019-2020) sitcom, spin-off of the series The Kitchen and Hotel Eleon
- "Hotel Belgrade" (2020) third feature film, spin-off of the series Hotel Eleon and Grand

== "Kitchenverse" ==
- Chronology of events:
  - "The Kitchen" Season 1 (TV Series 2012-2016)
    - "The Kitchen: Animated Series" Season 1 (Animated TV Series 2016)
  - "The Kitchen" Seasons 2-3 (TV Series 2012-2016)
  - "The Kitchen in Paris" (2014)
  - "The Kitchen" Seasons 4-5 (TV Series 2012-2016)
  - "How I Became Russian" Season 1 (TV Series 2015)
  - "The Kitchen" Season 6 (TV Series 2012-2016)
  - "The Kitchen on departure" (two-part play 2017)
  - "Hotel Eleon" Season 1 (TV Series 2016-2017)
  - "The Kitchen. The Last Battle" (2017)
  - "Hotel Eleon" Seasons 2-3 (TV Series 2016-2017)
  - "Grand" Season 1 (TV Series 2018-2021)
  - "Grand" Season 2 (TV Series 2018-2021)
  - "#SenyaFedya" Seasons 1-3 (TV Series 2018–present)
  - "Kitchen. War for the Hotell" Season 1 (TV Series 2019-2020)
  - "Hotel Belgrade" (2020)
  - "Grand" Season 3 (TV Series 2018-2021)
  - "The Kitchen. War for the Hotel" Season 2 (TV Series 2019-2020)
  - "#SenyaFedya" Season 4 (TV Series 2018–present)
  - "Grand" Seasons 4-5 (TV Series 2018-2021)
  - "#SenyaFedya" Season 5 (TV Series 2018–present)

== Rating and adaptation of the series in other countries ==
The show has been very successful in Russia and in other countries of the former Soviet Union. The show made the channel STS the number 1 channel in the "21:00-21:30", surpassing Channel 1, HTB, Russia-1 and other channels.

Adaptation of the series in other countries:

- Since 2016 the series has been shown with Serbian subtitles on the Serbian and Montenegrin channel Prva Srpska Televizija.
- Since 2015 the series has been shown with Mongolian voiceover on the Mongolian TV channel Edutainment TV.
- The Georgian adaptation of the series premiered in 2015 on GDS TV.
- In Greece, the adaptation titled Μάλιστα, σεφ! (Yes, boss!) was aired on Mega Channel.
- There was also an adaptation in Estonia around 2016.
- in Portugal, the adaptation series Sim, chef (Yes, boss) were aired on the channel RTP1.
- In the US, the first season of "Kitchen" can be ordered on Amazon under the name "The Kitchen" since 2015.
- Since 5 June 2017, the series is shown with Croatian subtitles on the Croatian channel RTL Televizija under the name Kuhinja ("Kitchen").
- In Slovenia, the adaptation series Ja, Chef! were aired in June 2021 on the streaming service Voyo (by Pro Plus).
- In Poland, the adaptation series Kuchnia were aired in polish TV Polsat in September 2021.
- In Hungary, the original aired with Hungarian voiceover under the title Igen, séf. A Hungarian version aired on March 19, 2022, as A Séf meg a többiek.
