= Jana Nedzvetskaya =

Russian designer

- Born: Tatyana Ivanovna Nedvetskaya; 25 December 1957 (age 68); Vorkuta, USSR
- Education: VGIK
- Labels: LO, JN
- Spouse(s): Andrey Yanovich Nedzvetsky; Ivan Germanovich Novozhenov
- Children: Nedzvetskaya Ekaterina Andreevna, 5 April 1980 (age 46)
- Awards: Asti Film Festival, Best Foreign Feature Film (2019, Italy, Asti), Miami Fashion Film Festival, «best film» (2018, USA), Best Fashion Film 2017, Sarajevo Fashion Film Festival (2017, Herzegovin).
- Website: http://misslo.com

Tatyana Ivanovna Nedvetskaya (born 1957, Vorkuta, USSR), known professionally as Jana Nedzvetskaya, is a Russian designer, a member of the Union of Russian Writers, founder and creative director of LO brands, JanaNedzvetskaya (JN), Lolly (children's collection).For the first time in the world, I presented a collection of clothes for water in online mode. Underwater shows "Harmagedon. Psalm 36:29 "Jana Nedzvetskaya s/s 2014" and "The Alphabet of ben Sirach. Lilith s/s 2016" They won world recognition and were broadcast on Fashion TV.

== Education ==
- 1977 — Moscow State University of Civil Engineering
- 1985 — Maxim Gorky Literature Institute, the prose
- 1985 — VGIK, Gerasimov Institute of Cinematography, scenario Faculty
- 2017 — MShK (Moscow School of Cinema), filmmaking

== Career ==
Jana Nedzvetskaya was born on December 25, 1957, in Vorkuta Komi ASSR, in a family of builders. For ten years already Jana began sewing dresses from her mother's outfits. Then she started to create clothes for girlfriends. Having grown up, she began to dress her mother's friends. In 1992 he organized a workshop for the production of women's clothing. In 1996- 1997 - traineeship at the Institut Français de la Mode France. In 1997, Jana won a grant from the IREX group "Business for Russia, trained and worked in the US, Portland, Oregon with Hanna Anderson. In 1997, after an internship with Hanna Anderson United States, Y. Nedzvetskaya created her own brand LO * (from LOVE). In 2010, creates another brand - JN. Brands LO and JN are fashionable women's clothes of class Pret-a-porter. For several years, twice a year, he took part in the Russian Fashion Week. In 2014, he became the first domestic designer to organize the underwater display of the collection "HAR-MAGHEDON - Psalm 36:29". The first underwater display of the collection of the brand, held on the island of Santorini, fashion critics rated as revolutionary.

== Brand ==
In 2011, the brands LO and JN were acquired by the French company Chantal Paris group. According to the contract signed, Jana Nedzvetska became a creative director and chief designer of the collections

In 2016, 20 branded stores were opened in all major cities of Russia and Kazakhstan. All collections first appear in the monobrand online store [misslo.com] In a year, the LO brand produces 12 full-value capsule collections, each with its original name, expressing the essence and meaning of the collection.

The philosophy of the brand: "Success is primarily a love for people and a desire to make them a little bit happier. I want to see the girls successful, and successful husband next to them. And I succeed. When buying my dresses, the girls successfully marry, as the brand's clothing enhances their social status. So, in addition to the "grandmother of Russian design," I often call myself a real matchmaker of all Russia."

Clients

Five million people is the total number of LO and JN brands clothes buyers for 27 years. Among the clients of the designer: Yelena Ksenofontova, Svetlana Masterkova, Larisa Verbitskaya, Chulpan Khamatova, Alena Babenko, Anna Chicherova, Elena Vaenga, Irina Lachina, Liza Arzamasova.

== Activities ==
- Fashion shows of Nedzvetskaya are integrated into the actual world context, creating a resonance in fashion business and in public life.

The "Orange Revolution" show (2012) became a response to the first Ukrainian revolution, and the "Bridge between two worlds" (Promenade de la Croisette, 2013) - a fashion-conscious global problem of confrontation between East and West.

- In 2015, the second underwater display of the collection of Jana Nedzvetskaya SS17 "Alphabet Ben-Sira. Lilith" contributes to the strengthening of the Russian market of fashion and joint development of the Crimean region. The collection of the spring-summer season 2017, which was presented by the founder of the brand LO, is conceptually built around the legend of the creation of the world and the first woman. 38 kinds of various fabrics have been used, they undergone preliminary examination for interaction with sea water. Demonstration of the collection took place in the form of an underwater show at Cape Tarkhankut in Crimea. The film about the underwater fashion show was released in December 2016 by RIA Novosti
- 2015 collection "Patterns for Barack O" show is the fashion's response to the sanctions against Russia.
- In September 2015, in Sevastopol, on Cape Fiolent, Yana Nedzvetskaya held a show of the collection s/s 2016 #ForCleanWorld. During Jan's show and her team cleaned Cape Fiolent within a week.
- 2016 Autumn-winter show "What dead bunny thinks about fashion," Y. Nedzvetskaya supported the Russian manufacturers, who are able to compete with European brands. The show was attended by: actresses Yelena Ksenofontova, Liza Arzamasova, Irina Lachina, Natalia Lesnikovskaya
- In 2017, the presentation of the video "Alphabet Ben-Syrah. Lilit" was held at MIARussia Today press center.

The video received the "Art Direction" award at the 6th annual Fashion Film FestivalL, Chicago, United States

- Since 2016, Jana Nedzvetskaya known as active fashion columnist in popular Russian media platforms.
- In April 2019, Yana Nedzvetskaya presented a collection spring-summer - 2019 on an ordinary girl. The project "The whole world is me" - supported by Olympic champion Anna Chicherova, TV and radio host Alisa Selezneva.

== Awards ==
- 2014 — Yana Nedzvetskaya stages underwater fashion show Harmagedon. Psalm 36:29 s/s 2014 praised by mainstream media. The show has won Event of the Year - Best Fashion Event National Awards.
- 2016 — A new short film What Does a Dead Rabbit Think about Fashion starring Elena Ksenofontova, Liza Arzamasova, Irina Lachina, Natalia Lesnikovskaya, Maria Romanova, Alisa Selezneva has been released.
- 2016 — A short film about the creation of the world The Alphabet of Ben-Sirach. Lilith starring Liza Arzamasova has been released. For this film, fashion models acted underwater near the Tarkhankut peninsula, Crimea. The film was shown to media reporters and guests at RIA Novosti.
- 2017 — A short film EXODUS.20 starring Yulia Romshina has been presented at MORI CINEMA.
- 2018 — Yana, who has broken the tradition of presenting a new collection on the runway keeps making artful and intelligent films. A short film Hysterical starring Anna Chicherova, an outstanding sports personality and a famous olympic athlete has been released.
- 2020 — A first full-length film Killer News from Chukhloma starring Anna Chicherova and Marina Yakovleva has been released. The first public screening is planned for February 2020. Yet the film has won the Asti Film Festival Award as the best foreign full-length film (2019 Asti, Italy).

== Filmography ==
In 2015, a biographical film about Jana Nedzvetskaya was published on Mir TV: "Why am I a" bad girl"

In 2017, Jana Nedzvetskaya presents the collection autumn-winter 2017 with the short film "Exodus 20". A dramatic plot about the different truths of the military past unfolds against the backdrop of the majestic landscapes of the Russian North.*

- 2016 — What Does a Dead Rabbit Think about Fashion
- 2016 — The Alphabet of Ben-Sirach. Lilith
- 2017 — EXODUS.20
- 2018 — Hysterical
- 2018 — Killer News from Chukhloma
