= Grigory Antipenko =

Russian film and theater actor

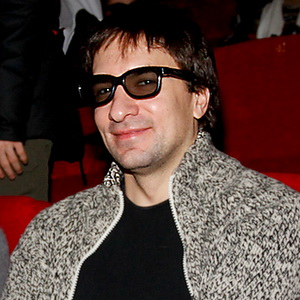
- Antipenko in 2012
- Born: Grigory Aleksandrovich Antipenko; October 10, 1974 (age 52); Moscow, RSFSR, USSR
- Occupation: Actor
- Years active: 2002–present

Grigory Aleksandrovich Antipenko (Russian: Григорий Александрович Антипенко; born October 10, 1974) is a Russian film and theater actor.

== Biography ==
Born October 10, 1974, in a family of engineers in Moscow.

As a child he lived at Mosfilmovskaya Street and opposite the studio, where his mother worked as a process engineer. From an early age fascinated by biology, since 8 years he studied encyclopedias, memorizing the names of animals in Latin, and dreamed of traveling. Reptiles, especially snakes - most favorite fauna.

From his youth he studied at drama school, but in a higher Boris Shchukin Theatre Institute did only 22 years old. Prior to that, he graduated from pharmaceutical school and worked as a fitter in the scene Satiricon Theatre.

In 2003 he graduated from the Boris Shchukin Theatre Institute (course of Rodion Ovchinnikov).

In 2003-2004 he worked in the theater Et cetera. In 2011 he was invited to the Vakhtangov Theatre directed by Mikhail Tsitrinyak Medea.

In September 2013, he joined the troupe Vakhtangov Theatre.

== Selected filmography ==
- Code of Honor (2002) as episode
- Not Born Beautiful (2005 – 2006) as Andrey Zhdanov
- Shakespeare Never Dreamed (2006) as Stepanov / Rogue / Bell
- Waiting for a Miracle (2007) as passenger on the plane
- Angels Cried that Night (2008) as Ivan Nikitin
- Moscow, I Love You! (2007) as Sergey Aleksandrovich
- A Mother's Heart (2010)
- Chyornaya metka (2011)
- Pulya-dura 4: Agent i sokrovishche natsii (2011)
- Vozmezdie (2011)
- Pulya-dura 5: Izumrudnoe delo agenta (2011)
- Spasti muzha (2011)
- Vozvrashchenie v 'A' (2011)
- Vesna v dekabre (2011)
- Vasilki dlya Vasilisy (2012)
- Veryu (2012)
- Otdam zhenu v khoroshie ruki (2012)
- Balzakovskiy vozrast, ili Vse muzhiki svo... 5 let spustya (2013)
- 45 sekund (2013)
- Podporuchik Romashov (2013)
- Torgsin (2017) as Viktor Serebrov
- Знахарь (2019)

== Awards ==
- 2006 – The People's Prize TV Star (Ukraine) in the category Best TV Actor of the Year
- 2008 – Best Actor at the festival Love Man named after Sergei Gerasimov

== Private life ==
Grigory Antipenko's first wife Elena Antipenko, with whom he has a son - Alexander (December 16, 1999). From 2006 till 2012 he was in civil partnership with actress Yulia Takshina (born July 9, 1980), whom he met on the set of the television series Not Born Beautiful. After six years of relationship, the couple broke up. They have two sons - Ivan (June 27, 2007) and Fedor (July 3, 2009). In 2019, the actor announced that he entered into an official marriage for the second time and his 4th son Athanasius (July 3, 2019) was born. The name of the new wife is kept secret.
