= Dogs' Feast =

- Russian: Собачий пир
- Directed by: Leonid Menaker
- Written by: Viktor Merezhko
- Produced by: Mark Rudinstein
- Starring: Natalya Gundareva; Sergey Shakurov; Larisa Udovichenko; Anna Polikarpova; Kristina Denga
- Cinematography: Vladimir Kovzel
- Edited by: Irina Rudenko
- Music by: Andrei Petrov
- Production company: Lenfilm
- Release date: 1990
- Running time: 100 min.
- Country: Soviet Union
- Language: Russian

Dogs' Feast (Russian: Собачий пир, romanized: Sobachiy pir) is a 1990 Soviet drama film directed by Leonid Menaker.

== Plot ==
Zhanna, a disheveled and downcast alcoholic, dreams of finding a prince and starting a new life. On New Year's Eve, while working as a cleaner at a train station, she meets Arkady, a dejected man sitting alone. Out of boredom, she brings him home, where she discovers that Arkady doesn’t drink—his sobriety tied to a troubled past.

What follows is a bleak portrayal of Zhanna's routine of perpetual alcoholism, contrasted with Arkady’s enigmatic presence. Despite her chaotic behavior, Zhanna retains a glimmer of humanity in her eyes, while Arkady, with an air of quiet dignity, consistently refuses to drink. Their dynamic takes a turn during a visit to Leningrad, where Arkady’s backstory unravels: once a hard worker and alcoholic, he served time in prison for a fight. In Leningrad, he learns that his wife and children have disowned him. Overwhelmed by this revelation, he breaks his sobriety, but Zhanna carefully brings him home and nurses him back to health.

Determined to change, Zhanna stops drinking and tries to rebuild her life. She even helps Arkady, providing him with new clothes and companionship. Yet, Arkady begins an affair with their flirtatious neighbor Sasha, a hairdresser who offers him fleeting excitement. Arkady mistakenly believes he is in love with Sasha and proposes they leave together to start anew, but Sasha dismisses him as naïve.

Zhanna discovers the affair but forgives Arkady. Despite her efforts, Arkady grows abusive, telling her they are too different and that he loves another. Zhanna, still hopeful, tries to maintain their relationship, but Arkady remains indifferent to her inner strength and capacity for love.

In a final act of despair, realizing that Arkady will never see her for who she truly is, Zhanna turns on the gas and lies down beside him, sealing her tragic fate.

== Cast ==
- Natalya Gundareva as Zhanna
- Sergey Shakurov as Arkady Petrovich
- Larisa Udovichenko as Alexandra
- Anna Polikarpova as Natasha
- Christina Denga as Christina
- Lyudmila Aleksandrova as Katya, Natasha's mother
- Valentina Pugacheva as neighbor
- Viktor Bychkov as Vityok, Jeanne's neighbor
- Nikolay Dik as policeman
- Galina Saburova as Maria Grigorievna
