= Yelena Podkaminskaya =

Russian actress

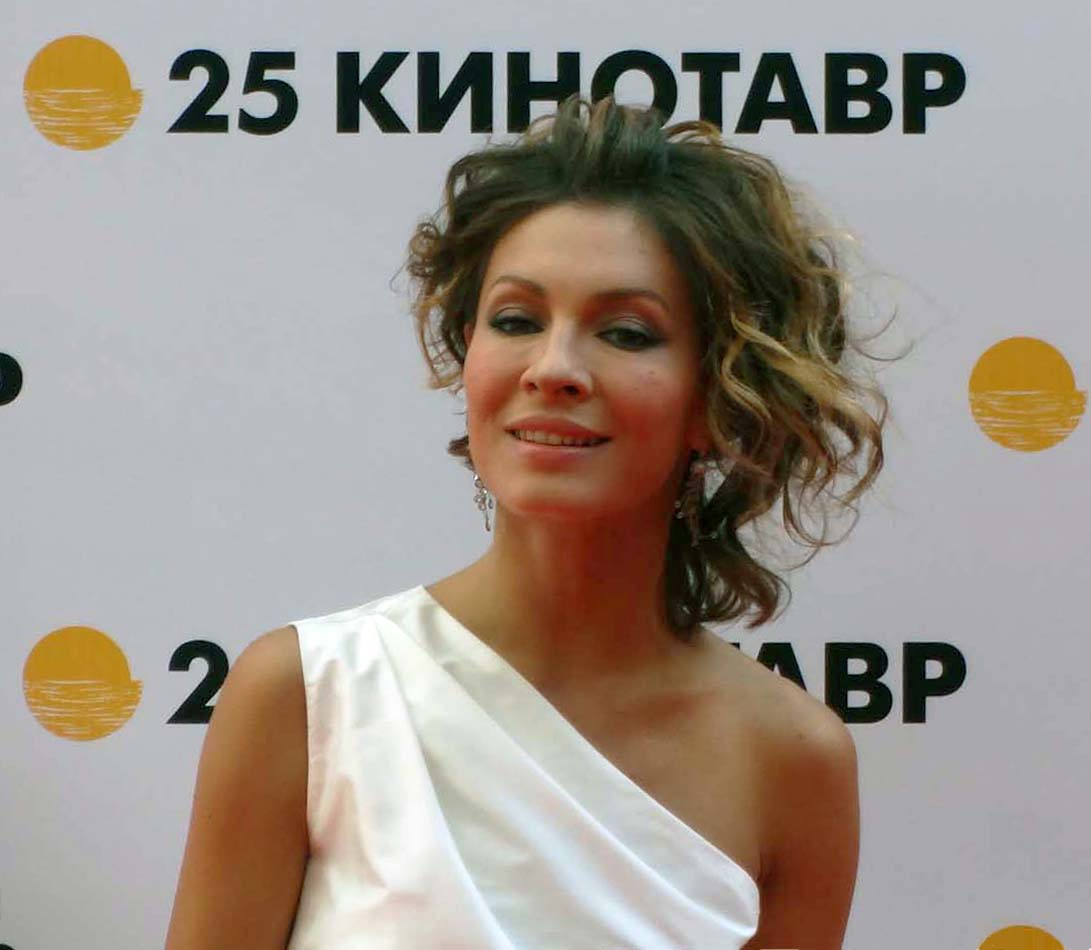
- Podkaminskaya at the opening ceremony of the festival "Kinotavr-2014" in Sochi.
- Born: Yelena Ilinichna Podkaminskaya; 10 April 1979 (age 47); Moscow, Russian SFSR, Soviet Union
- Occupations: Theatre actress, television
- Years active: 2002–present

Yelena Ilinichna Podkaminskaya (also tr. Elena; Russian: Еле́на Ильи́нична Подками́нская; born 10 April 1979) is a Russian theatre, television and film actress. She starred in the television series Kitchen (Кухня) and IP Pirogova (ИП Пирогова).

She graduated from WTU. BV Shchukin (course A Shirvindt) in 2001; she participated in the group Theater of Satire in 2000.

== Biography ==
Yelena Podkaminskaya, born in Moscow to a musical family, founded the Shcherbinka arts studio "Rainbow", and directs the music studio of the elementary music-making "Rainbow". She is also a member of the city council Scherbinkinskogo.

She graduated from the Boris Shchukin Theatre Institute (2001, the rate of A. Schirvindt). Since 2000, she works in a staff of the troupe of Moscow Satire Theatre.

Her film debut was in the role of Ursula Bourne in the film "Failure Poirot" (2002, directed by Sergei Ursuliak). Since 2012, she is best known for her participation in the television series "Kitchen".

In June 2013, Elena Podkaminskaya appeared on the cover of men's magazine Maxim. On November 30, 2013, she won the show Dancing with the Stars with her partner Andrey Karpov.

From 6 September to 28 December 2014, she participated in a weekly television show of the First Channel, season five of Ice Age with partner Peter Tchernyshev and won the Audience Award.

== Filmography ==
=== Film ===
Year	Title	Role	Notes
2002	Wildcard	Lida	
2006	Andersen. Life Without Love	Dorothea Melchior	
2007	Nurse	Sveta	
2007	Dance sisters	Marina	
2007	A few simple desires		
2008	Twice in the same river	Sveta	
2008	The Inhabited Island	Secretary of the Wanderer	
2009	Aside from the war	Masha	
2010	I will remember	Lena	
2011	What else do men	Nastya	
2014	The Kitchen in Paris	Viktoria "Vika" Goncharova	
2016	Love for Rent	Alena	
2016	Diary of a new Russian	Nadia	
2020	Wolf	Anastasia Petrova	
2022	We	I-330	Unreleased
2025	Red Silk	Anna Volkova	

=== Television ===
Year	Title	Role	Notes
2002	Failure Poirot		TV series
2003-14	Code of Honor 2	Inna	TV series (second season)
2004	Lily of the Valley Silver 2		TV series
2005	Adjutants of Love	Pauline Bonaparte	TV series
2007	Protection against	Elena Bakova	TV series
2007	More important than love	Lida	TV series
2008	Steal ...		TV series
2008	I'll be back	Zoya, sister Musi	TV series
2008	Petrovka 38. Team Semenova	Nina Zataeva	TV series
2008	The Man Without a Gun		TV series
2009	The Brothers Karamazov	Agafya Ivanovna	TV series
2009	August Ambassador		TV series
2012	Return ticket	Masha	TV
2012	Kitchen (TV series)	Viktoria "Vika" Goncharova	TV series
2012	Only Love	Katia	TV series
2015	Freud's method 2	Elena Polonskaya	TV series
2016	Fate called "Farman"	Olga	Mini-series
