= Hotel Belgrade =

2020 Russian-Serbian film

- Directed by: Konstantin Statsky
- Written by: Vyacheslav Zub; Anatoly Molchanov; Vasily Kutsenko
- Produced by: Eduard Iloyan; Vitaly Shlyappo; Aleksey Trotsyuk; Denis Zhalinsky; Mikhail Tkachenko; Miloš Biković; Miodrag Radonič
- Starring: Miloš Biković; Diana Pozharskaya; Boris Dergachyov; Alexandra Kuzenkina; Egor Koreshkov; Ljubomir Bandović
- Cinematography: Fyodor Struchev; Ulugbek Khamrayev
- Edited by: Kirill Abramov
- Music by: Denis Vorontsov
- Production companies: Start Studio; Yellow, Black & White; Archangel Studios; Cinema Fund
- Distributed by: Central Partnership; Art Vista (Serbia)
- Release date: March 5, 2020
- Running time: 107 minutes
- Countries: Russia, Serbia
- Languages: Russian, Serbian
- Budget: ₽150 million

Hotel Belgrade (Russian: Отель «Белград») is a 2020 Russian-Serbian romantic comedy film directed by Konstantin Statsky, a sequel to the television series Hotel Eleon and Grand. It stars Miloš Biković and Diana Pozharskaya.

It was theatrically released in Russia on March 5, 2020.

== Plot ==
Pavel Arkadyevich is a cheerful owner of a five-star hotel in Belgrade who indulges in a reckless lifestyle filled with drinking and spending time with women, fully aware that this way of life does not bring him happiness. Due to a ridiculous car accident, he accidentally damages a new expensive acquisition belonging to a mafia collector known as "Fountain of Duchamp". To settle his debts, the criminal boss forces Pavel to marry his daughter. As preparations for the wedding begin, Pavel unexpectedly encounters Dasha, his old love from Volchansk, who has come to Serbia and fallen victim to a thief. Realizing that he still loves Dasha, Pavel decides to seize the opportunity to pursue true happiness .

== Cast ==
- Miloš Biković as Pavel "Pasha" Arkadijevic (Serbian: Pavle, English: Paul), owner of the Belgrade Hotel in Serbia, Vedrana's ex-fiancé
- Diana Pozharskaya as Daria "Dasha" Kanaeva is a Russian athlete and travel blogger in Serbia, Pyotr Romanov ex-wife
- Boris Dergachev as Ivan, Pasha's friend
- Aleksandra Kuzenkina as Yulia Makarovna Komissarova (Serbian: Julija), Dasha's best friend
- Egor Koreshkov as Pyotr Romanov flew to Mars, Dasha's ex-husband
- Ljubomir Bandović as Dusan, a crime boss
- Jelisaveta Orašanin as Vedrana, Dusan's daughter
- Miodrag Radonjić as Srecko
- Srđan Todorović as Milos, Pasha's grandfather

== Production ==
In October 2018, it became known about the creation of a feature film based on the sitcoms Hotel Eleon and Grand - Hotel Belgrade, the shooting of which started on September 5, 2019.

Principal photography took place in Belgrade, as well as other Serbian towns and villages in Serbia, and Moscow, Russia. The film shows Serbian sights and landscapes in detail.

== Release ==
The film premiered in Russian cinemas on March 5, 2020, by Central Partnership.
