= Mark Rudinstein =

Russian actor, film producer, and television presenter (1946–2021)

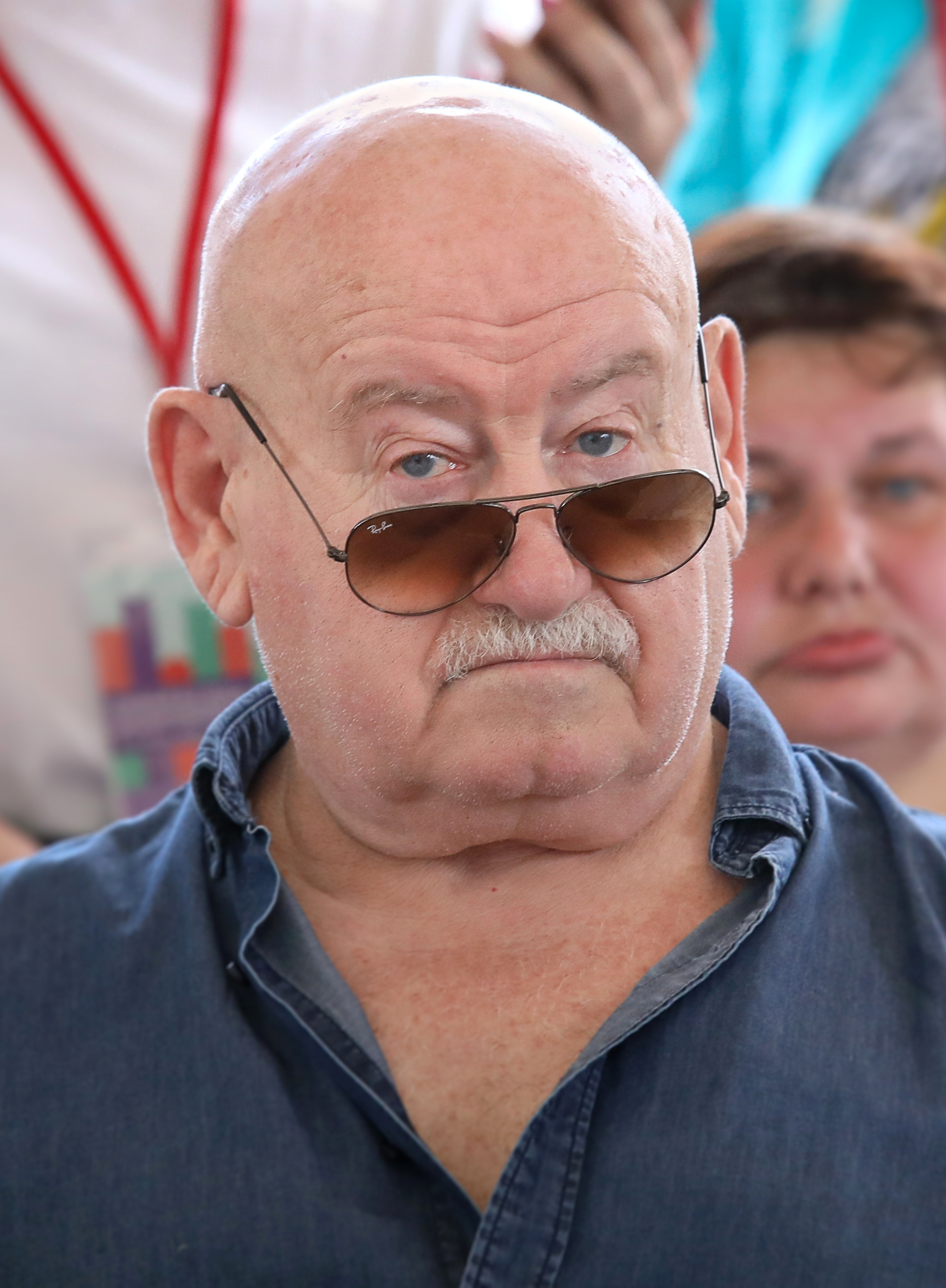
- Rudinstein in 2019
- Born: 7 April 1946; Odesa, Ukrainian SSR, Soviet Union
- Died: 5 December 2021 (aged 75); Moscow, Russia
- Education: Boris Shchukin Theatre Institute
- Known for: Kinotavr

Mark Izrailevich Rudinstein (Russian: Ма́рк Григо́рьевич Рудинште́йн, Ukrainian: Марк Григорович Рудінштейн; 7 April 1946 – 5 December 2021) was a Russian actor, director, film producer and television presenter. He was the founder and producer of the international film festival Kinotavr, and the organizer of the first rock festival in the USSR, which took place on the "Green Stage" in Podolsk near Moscow in September 1987.

Rudinstein was born on April 7, 1946, in Odessa to a Jewish family. His father, Israel (Kasryl) Grigorievich Rudinstein, was the manager of the 'Military Book' store, and his mother was Tauba Isaakovna Rudinstein. He died on 5 December 2021, at the age of 76.

== Filmography ==
=== As an actor ===
- Come Look at Me (2001) as a Man with champagne
- Moscow Saga (2004) as Lvov
- It Doesn't Hurt Me (2006) as Zilberman
- Kitchen (2015) as David Mikhailovich

=== As a producer ===
- The Suicide (1990)
- Dogs' Feast (1990)
- Cynics (1991)
