= Alexey Lysenkov =

Russian television presenter

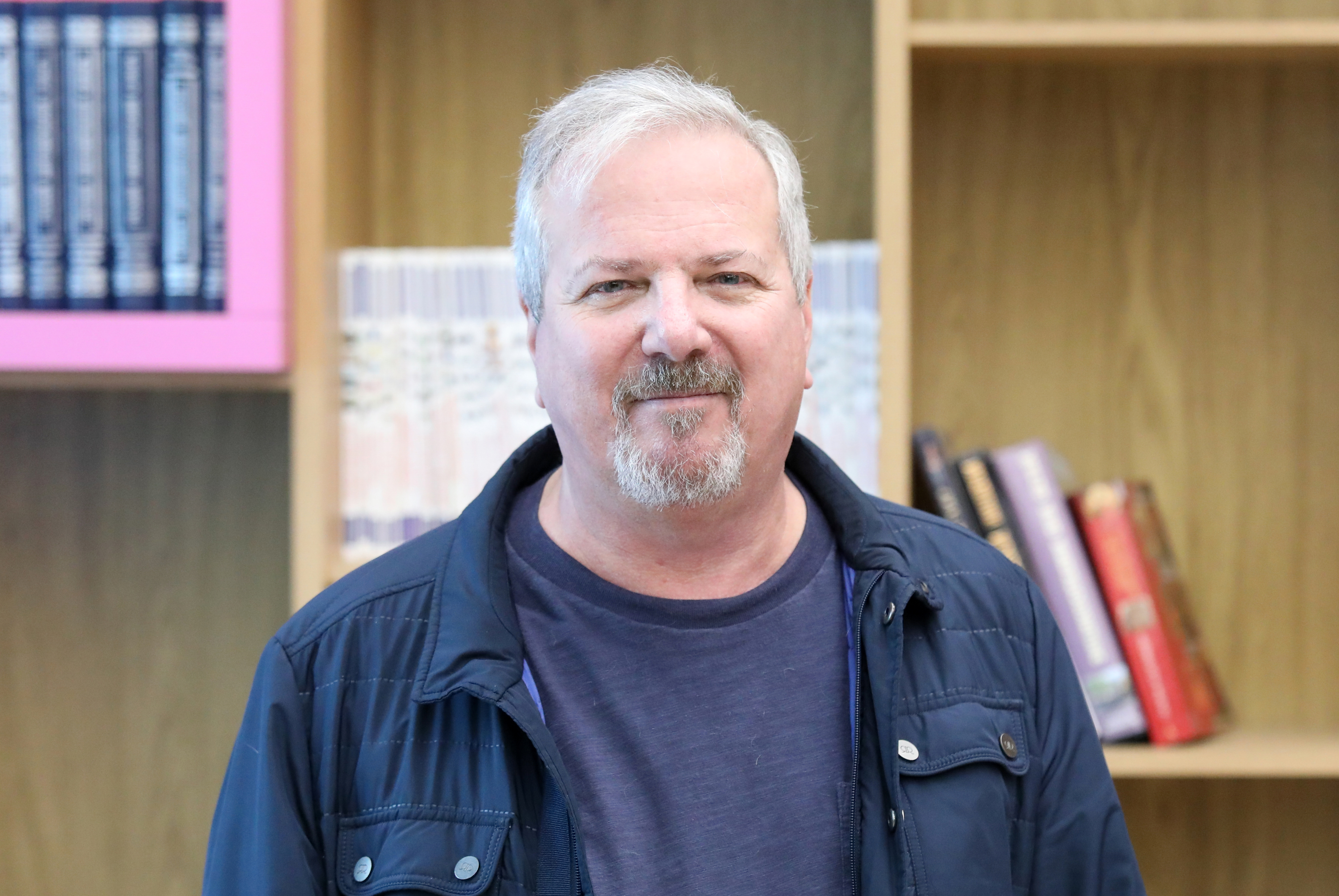
- Born: Alexey Nikolayevich Lysenkov; 26 January 1965 (age 61); Soviet Union
- Occupations: Actor, TV presenter, radio host, showman
- Awards: TEFI (1998)

Alexey Nikolayevich Lysenkov (Russian: Алексей Николаевич Лысенков; born January 26, 1965, Kiev) is a Russian television presenter. He is pro-rector of the International Institute for Film, showman, Television and Radio Broadcasting.

He studied at the Shchukin School under Alla Kazanskaya.

Since 1992, he has been the writer and host of Your Own Director (2x2; Russia-1).
