= Believe It or Not (film) =

- DVD cover
- Russian: Небывальщина
- Directed by: Sergei Ovcharov
- Written by: Sergei Ovcharov; Vyacheslav Shishkov
- Produced by: Viktor Izvekov
- Starring: Aleksandr Kuznetsov; Aleksey Buldakov; Sergey Bekhterev; Igor Ivanov; Nina Usatova
- Narrated by: Nikolai Pastukhov
- Cinematography: Valeri Fedosov
- Music by: Igor Matsiyevsky
- Production company: Lenfilm
- Release date: 1983
- Running time: 80 min.
- Country: Soviet Union
- Language: Russian

Believe It or Not (Russian: Небывальщина, romanized: Nebyvalshchina) is a 1983 Soviet comedy film directed by Sergei Ovcharov.

== Plot ==
The film is based on the story Divers by Vyacheslav Shishkov, Russian legends, songs, tales and ditties, and tells about the slack Neznam, the village inventor Bobyl and the brave Soldier.

== Cast ==
- Aleksandr Kuznetsov as Neznam
- Aleksey Buldakov as soldier
- Sergey Bekhterev as Bobyl
- Igor Ivanov as seducer
- Nina Usatova as Neznam's wife
- Nikolai Pastukhov as narrator
- Slava Polunin as Tsar
- Nikolai Terentyev as courtier
- Tatyana Zakharova as peasant's wife
- Anatoly Slivnikov as sergeant
