= Dmitry Nazarov =

Soviet and Russian actor

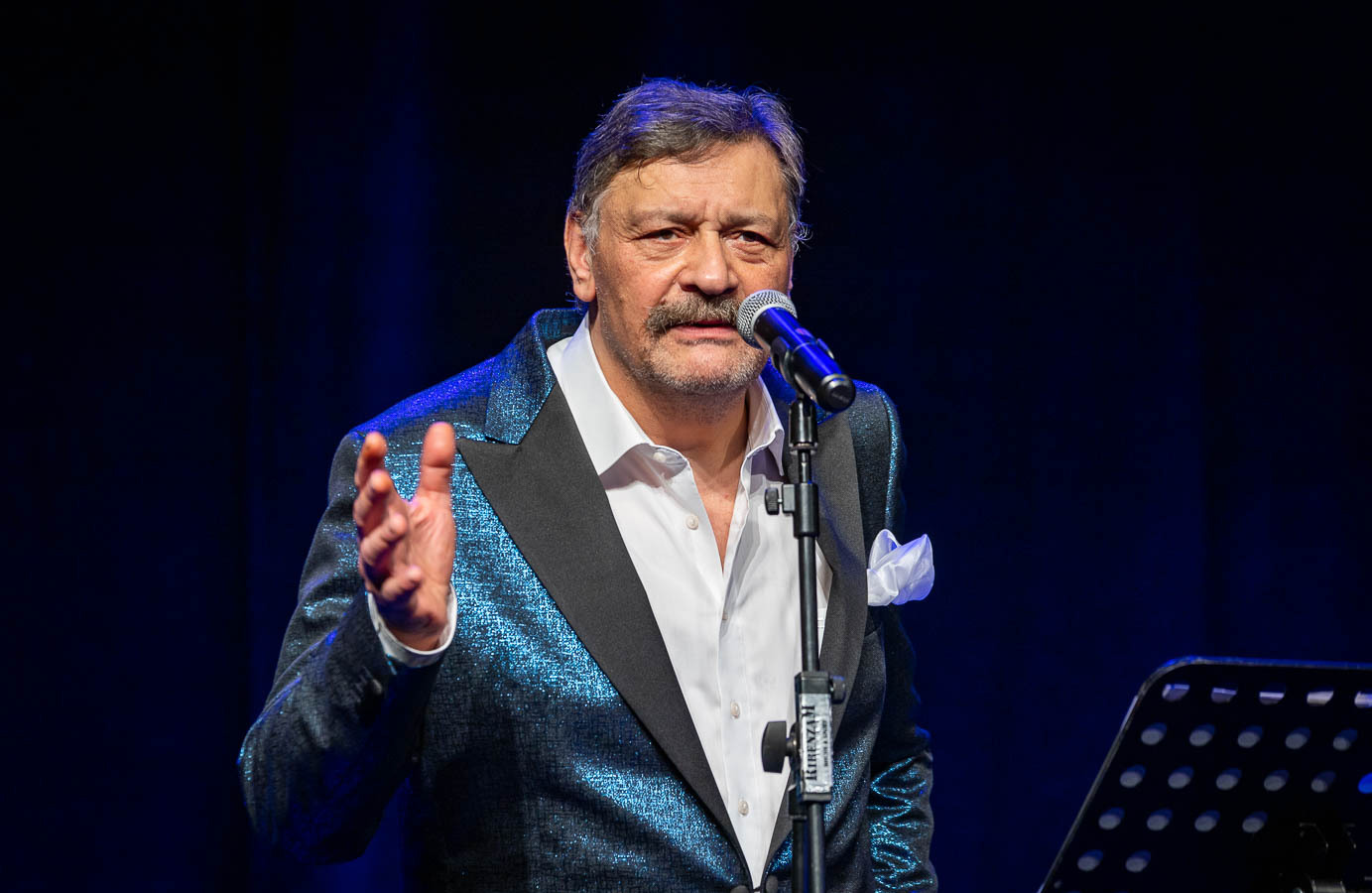
- Born: Dmitry Yurievich Nazarov; 4 July 1957 (age 69); Moscow, Soviet Union
- Occupations: Actor, television presenter, poet
- Years active: 1980–present
- Height: 1.96 m (6 ft 5 in)
- Spouse: Olga Vasilyeva

Dmitry Yurievich Nazarov (Russian: Дми́трий Ю́рьевич Наза́ров; born 4 July 1957) is а Soviet and Russian actor, television presenter and poet. He was named People's Artist of Russia in 2000.

He is known for Le Concert (2009), Largo Winch II (2011), Yeltsin: Three Days in August (2011) and Kitchen (2012–2016).

== Early life ==
Dmitry Nazarov was born in Moscow, Soviet Union. In his youth, he worked as a pastry chef at a bakery. In 1980, he graduated from the Mikhail Shchepkin Higher Theatre School. From 1980 to 1995, he worked at the Maly Theater, then at the "Sphere" theater and the Theatre of the Russian Army. From 2002 to 2022, he was employed by the Moscow Art Theatre.

== Career ==
Between 2002 and 2008, Nazarov hosted the cooking show Culinary Duel on NTV. He also served as the host of the TVC inventor competition program Think Tank from 2009 onwards.

In the mystery series Call, he played chief investigator Khromov, who specializes in mysterious crimes.

Since 2012, Nazarov has played the lead role of chef Viktor Barinov on the Russian comedy TV series Kitchen.

In 2013, he became the host of the Friday! show The Hunger Games. In 2014, he became a presenter of show Recipe for a Million on STS. On September 5, 2015, he once again became the host of program Culinary Duel.

Since the start of 2022 Russian invasion of Ukraine, Nazarov has criticized the war online. In January 2023, it was reported that Nazarov and his wife were fired by the Moscow Art Theatre for their anti-war views.

== Awards and honours ==
In May 1993, he was awarded the honorary title of Merited Artist of the Russian Federation.

Nazarov has won the Crystal Turandot Award for Best Actor in the 1997/1998 season, for Satin in the play TSATRA "The Lower Depths", the "Seagull" for the best actor of the season, "Mask of Zorro" (2005 play "The Forest"), and the Icarus animation award in 2017.

In March 2000, he was awarded the honorary title of People's Artist of Russia. He received the Order of Friendship in 2008.

== Personal life ==
He has one daughter with his first wife Natalia, and one son and daughter with his second wife, Russian actress Olga Vasilyeva. As of 2024, he and Vasilyeva reside in Cannes.

== Selected filmography ==
Year	Title	Role	Notes
1980	Coast	lance	TV
1983	The Cherry Orchard	passer	TV
1992/95	Trifles of Life	Alexander Vakarov	TV series
1998	At Sword's Рoints	Svetozar Vodopyanov	Mini-series
2001	Head of the Citizen	Arkady Halandovsky, store manager	TV series
2002	Kamenskaya 3	Roman Rubtsov, businessman	TV series
2002	Law	Ivan Sklyar	TV series
2003	Time is Money	Viktor Dolgopolov	TV series
2003	The Angel on the Road	Gennady	TV series
2003	Railway Station	Viktor Larin	TV series
2003	Turetsky' Marsh	mayor Alexander Yurievich	TV series (season 3)
2004	The Red Chapel	Leo Grossvogel	TV series
2004	Shtrafbat	father Michail	TV series
2005	Full Speed Ahead!	Andrei Lyakhov	TV series
2006	Money Day	Dostoevsky	
2006	Lusty, or Magnificent Four	Pavel	TV series
2006	Golden Calf	Adam Kozlevich	TV series
2006	Prince Vladimir	Dobrynya (voice)	
2006/09	Calling	Alexey Khromov	TV series (season 2,3,4)
2009	The New Adventures of Baba Yaga	(voice)	
2009	Le Concert	Aleksandr Abramovich Grosman	
2010/14	Fixico	Dedus (voice)	Animated series
2011	Largo Winch II	Virgil Nazatchov	
2011	Yeltsin: Three Days in August	Boris Yeltsin	TV
2011	Revelation	Andrey Knyazev, colonel	TV series
2012	Spy	Nadya's father	
2012	The Color of the Bird Cherry	Saveliy	TV series
2012/16	Kitchen	Viktor Petrovich Barinov, the head chef	TV series
2013/16	Alisa Knows What to Do!	Gromozeka (voice)	Animated series
2013	Möbius	Inzirillo	
2013	The Country is a Good Kiddies	the guard of the boundary of time	
2013/14	While the Village is Asleep	Gregory	TV series
2014	Ladoga	Kulyasov, major, commander	Mini-series
2014	The Kitchen in Paris	Viktor Petrovich Barinov, the head chef	
2015	SOS, Ded Moroz, or All Come True!	Ivan	
2017	Kitchen. The Last Battle	Viktor Petrovich Barinov, the head chef	
2017	Stalin	Joseph Stalin	
2019	Wild League	Rodion Balashov	
2019/20	Kitchen. War For The Hotel	Viktor Petrovich Barinov, the head chef	TV series
2020	Cosmoball	chief of police	

=== Dubbing ===
- The Jungle Book (1967) – Baloo
- Robin Hood (1973) – Little John
- Dr. Dolittle 2 (2001) – Sonny
- Daredevil (2003) – Wilson Fisk / Kingpin
- Ratatouille (2007) – Auguste Gusteau
- The Croods (2013) – Grug Crood
- The Nut Job (2014) – Raccoon
