= Egor Koreshkov =

Russian actor

- Егор Корешков
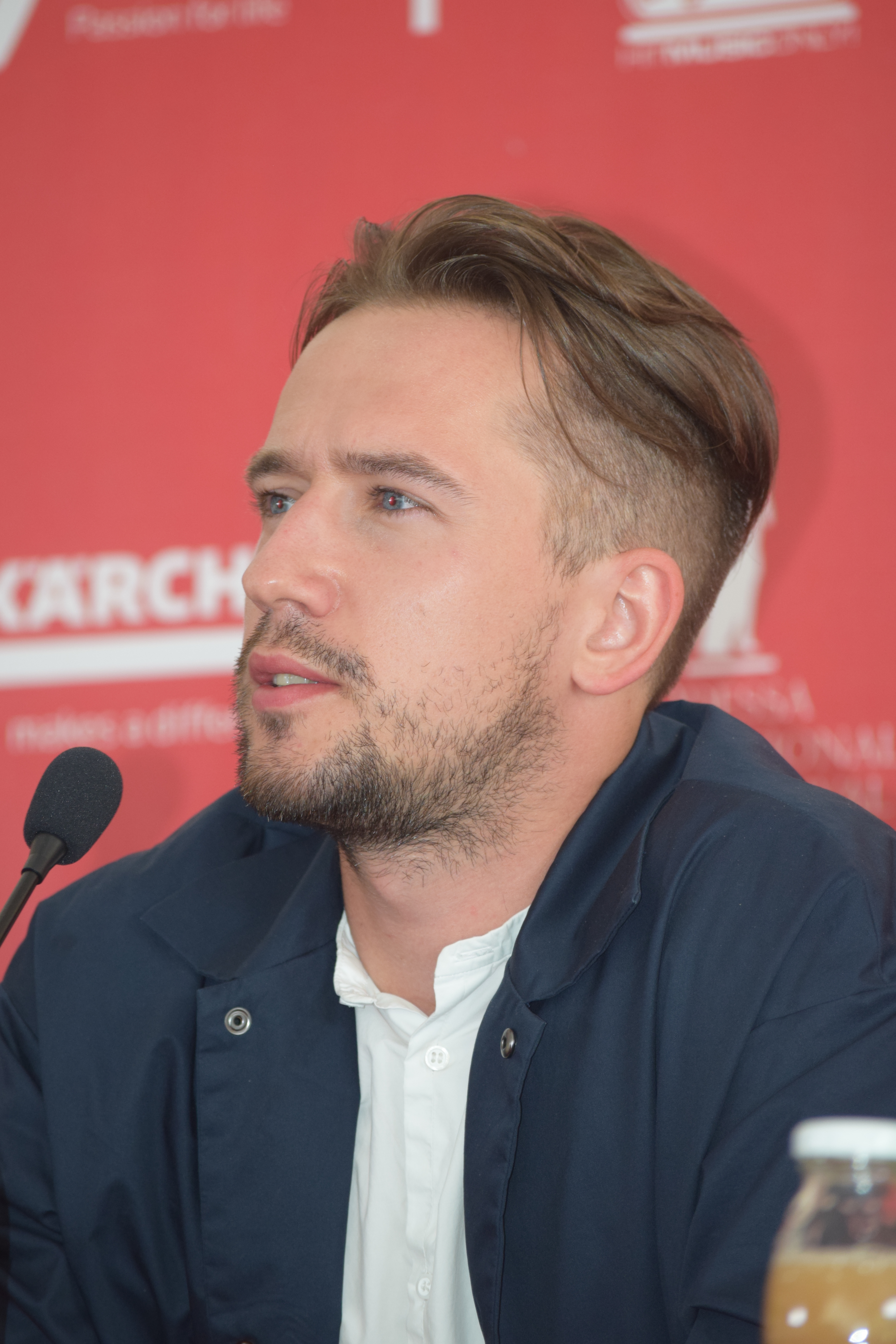
- Egor Koreshkov at the 2016 Film Festival.
- Born: Egor Aleksandrovich Koreshkov; March 31, 1986 (age 40); Moscow, RSFSR, USSR
- Occupation: Actor
- Years active: 2010–present

Egor Aleksandrovich Koreshkov (Russian: Его́р Алекса́ндрович Корешко́в; born March 31, 1986) is a Russian actor. He has appeared in over 50 films.

== Biography ==
Egor was born on March 31, 1986, into a family of musicians. He studied at the directing department of the Russian Institute of Theatre Arts. Since 2011 he has been working at the Theatre of Nations.

== Selected filmography ==
List of film credits
Year	Title	Role	Notes
2013	Kiss Them All!	Roma	
2013	Winter Journey	Borya	
2014	Kiss Them All! 2	Roma	(ru)
2015	Without Borders	Ivan	
2017	Life Ahead	Sergey Tyulenev	
2020	Hotel Belgrade	Pyotr Alekseevich Romanov	
2021	Girls Got Game	Vadim Panov	
2022	Project Gemini	Dr. Steven Ross	
2023	Forgotten Experiment	Jacob Blake	
2025	The Wizard of the Emerald City	John Smith	Based on the novel of the same name.
TBA	We	D-503	Unreleased

List of television credits
Year	Title	Role	Notes
2016	Sophia	Pietro	
2017	The Optimists	Andrey Muratov	
2020	257 Reasons to Live	Konstantin	
