= Forgotten Experiment =

2023 Russian science fiction film

- Directed by: Alexander Boguslavsky
- Written by: Sergey Kaluzhanov; Dmitry Zhigalov; Alexander Boguslavsky; Alexey Slushchev; Ilya Ipatov; Alexandra Primachenko
- Produced by: Viktor Denisyuk; Yevgeny Melentyev; Alexander Kurinsky; Nikolay Tabashnikov; Vladimir Denisyuk; Alexander Denisyuk; Dmitry Sushchenko; Alexander Boguslavsky
- Starring: Viktor Dobronravov; Egor Koreshkov; Valeriya Shkirando; Nikita Tarasov; Sofya Priss; Daniel Barnes; Egor Beroev
- Cinematography: Kirill Zotkin; Anatoly Simchenko
- Edited by: Serik Beyseu
- Music by: Ryan Otter; Ruslan Lepatov
- Production companies: KinoDanz (KD Studios); DidgitEra
- Distributed by: National Media Group Film Distribution
- Release date: June 15, 2023 (Russia)
- Running time: 105 minutes
- Country: Russia
- Languages: Russian, English
- Budget: ₽159 million
- Box office: ₽53 million

Forgotten Experiment (Russian: Сквозь время, lit. 'Through Time') is a 2023 English-language Russian science fiction thriller film directed by Alexander Boguslavsky. Starring Viktor Dobronravov and Egor Koreshkov, it is about scientists who find themselves in the zone of a mysterious anomaly.

It was theatrically released on June 15, 2023, by National Media Group Film Distribution.

== Plot ==
The film follows eccentric scientist Ethan Blake and his brother Jacob Blake, who discover a new energy source called Quantanium. They design an aircraft powered by this revolutionary fuel and, together with a research team, embark on an expedition using an unmanned aerial vehicle. However, an accident forces an emergency landing, leaving the crew unconscious. When Ethan regains consciousness, he sees soldiers taking their fuel capsule and, armed, begins tracking them.

He soon encounters a female soldier named Tina, who deceives him and leads him into a trap where he is knocked out again. As he interacts with her, Ethan notices a mysterious fog that Tina seems oblivious to. When he awakens, Ethan reunites with his crewmates hiding in an abandoned bunker. There, Ryan, a team member, reveals he has been collaborating with a woman named Alizabeth and that their crash was preplanned. He explains that Alizabeth intended for Ethan to visit this location, sparking a dispute among the group.

As Ethan pursues Ryan into the fog, he realizes that objects and people touched by the fog appear as they did in 1984. He encounters visions of soldiers from the past and even his father, Henry Blake. While searching for answers, Ethan corners Tina, but she denies any prior knowledge of the events. Meanwhile, an injured crewmate, Ava, is found and taken by soldiers for treatment.

The fog recedes, and the landscape shifts back to the present. The group theorizes that they are witnessing events from 1984, when a secret experiment involving Quantanium was conducted. They capture a man named Rob, who has been stranded in the fog for 40 years and knows its origin. He leads them to the original machine used to create Quantanium. Ethan, now obsessed with the machine's potential, envisions it as a path to immense wealth, but Ryan criticizes his motives and walks away in search of Ava.

As the fog envelops them once more, the team finds themselves under attack by soldiers from the 1980s experiment. Ethan and his crew are drawn deeper into the mysteries of the fog, where the usual laws of physics no longer apply. Their journey challenges their perceptions of reality and reveals hidden truths about themselves and their destinies.

== Cast ==
- Viktor Dobronravov as Ethan Blake
  - Platon Alekseyev as Ethan in childhood
- Egor Koreshkov as Jacob Blake
  - Miroslav Aksyonov as Jacob in childhood
- Valeriya Shkirando as Eva Adams
- Nikita Tarasov as Ted
- Sofya Priss as Tina Morozova
- Daniel Barnes as Ryan
- Egor Beroev as Professor Henry Blake
- Anna Lorian as Henry Blake's wife
- Andrey Zhigalov as Rob
  - Sevastian Bugaev as Rob in childhood
- Kristina Kukas as Kate

== Production ==
=== Filming ===
Filming of the new project took place at different times of the year both in pavilions and in natural conditions. For these purposes, a whole settlement was built near the Black Sea coast, where more than 20 tons of props, equipment and scenery were delivered from Moscow, and winter shots were filmed already in snow-covered locations near the Moscow Oblast.

== Release ==
Forgotten Experiment was released in Russian cinemas on June 15, 2023. The official distributor of the project in the country is the “National Media Group (NMG) Film Distribution” Company. It started streaming on Amazon Prime Video in November 2023.
