= The Kitchen in Paris =

- Theatrical release poster
- Directed by: Dmitriy Dyachenko
- Written by: Dmitriy Yan; Vasiliy Kutsenko; Pavel Danilov; Igor Tudvasev
- Based on: Kitchen (TV series) by Dmitriy Dyachenko, Zhora Kryzhovnikov and Anton Fedotov
- Produced by: Vyacheslav Murugov (ru); Eduard Iloyan; Vitaliy Shlyappo (ru); Aleksey Trotsyuk (ru); Dmitriy Dyachenko; Aleksandr Rubtsov; Igor Poptsov; Aleksey Andrianov; Aleksey Volkov
- Starring: Dmitry Nazarov; Mark Bogatyryov; Elena Podkaminskaya; Dmitry Nagiyev; Oleg Tabakov; Vincent Perez
- Cinematography: Sergey Dyshuk
- Edited by: Nikolai Bulygin; Max Polinsky; Mariya Likhachyova
- Music by: Ivan Kanayev; Anton Silaev; Aleksey Massalitinov
- Production companies: Yellow, Black and White-Group; STS (TV channel)
- Distributed by: Central Partnership
- Release date: 1 May 2014 (Russia)
- Running time: 106 minutes
- Country: Russia
- Language: Russian
- Budget: $2.3 million
- Box office: $14 million

The Kitchen in Paris (Кухня в Париже; Kukhnya v Parizhe) is a 2014 Russian comedy, a first feature film directed by Dmitriy Dyachenko of the television channel by STS and company by Yellow, Black and White-Group. It is a continuation of the third season of the television series The Kitchen (2012-2016). It stars Dmitry Nazarov, Mark Bogatyryov, Yelena Podkaminskaya and Dmitry Nagiyev.

The Kitchen in Paris was theatrically released in Russia on 1 May 2014 by Central Partnership.

== Plot ==
After the events of Season 3 of The Kitchen, the restaurant Claude Monet continued to grow and solidify its fame in Moscow, remaining a thriving establishment with a skillful owner, a diligent director, and excellent cuisine. However, all the team's hopes and efforts are shattered by the disastrous failure of a summit dinner for the Russian and French presidents.

The employees and the owner are forced to look for new work. After leaving Claude Monet, they head to Paris, the city of love and capital of France, which offers them new jobs, new charm, and new rivals. Viktor Barinov meets his own father, the chef de cuisine of the best restaurant in Paris, and Maxim Lavrov has to compete with Victoria's French boyfriend, who eventually attempts to propose to her. The season concludes with the wedding of Maxim and Victoria, as well as the staff's return to Russia.

== Cast ==
- Dmitry Nazarov as Viktor Barinov, the head chef.
- Mark Bogatyryov as Maxim "Max" Lavrov, a chef.
- Yelena Podkaminskaya as Viktoria "Vika" Goncharova, the restaurant's director.
- Dmitry Nagiyev as himself, the owner of both restaurants.
- Oleg Tabakov as Petr Barinov, Viktor's father and head chef of the restaurant Victor in Paris.
- Vincent Perez as Nicolas DuPont, the Chief of Protocol of the French President and Vika's boyfriend.
- Viktor Khorinyak as Konstantin "Kostya" Anisimov, the bartender.
- Olga Kuzmina as Anastasia "Nastya" Anisimova, a waitress and Kostya's wife.
- Sergey Lavygin as Arseniy "Senya" Chuganin, a chef specializing in meat.
- Mikhail Tarabukin as Fedor "Fedya" Yurchenko, a chef specializing in fish.
- Sergey Epishev as Lev "Lyova" Solovyov, the sous-chef
- Nikita Tarasov as Louis Benoît, the pastry chef.
- Zhanyl Asanbekova as Ainura, a janitor.
- Elena Chernyavskaya as Angelina Smirnova, a promotional model for the restaurant.
- Irina Temicheva as Eva Beletskaya, a waitress.
- Jib Pocthier as Baltazar Bartholomew, the sous-chef in Paris.
- Helena Noguerra as the French President.
- Anatoly Gorbunov as the Russian President.
- Igor Ivanov as Sergey, the Chief of Protocol of the Russian President.
- Christian Bujeau as Philip Boileau, a famous French restaurant critic.
- Kira Kreylis-Petrova as Max's grandma.

== Production ==
At the beginning of the film, some moments of the cartoon Ratatouille (film) are parodied, in the Russian dubbing of which the actor Dmitry Nazarov took part. Also at the beginning of the film, the Chef has a DVD with a cartoon in his office.

On the very first day, they shot the most difficult scene in Paris: a meeting of the Presidents of France and Russia, in which dozens of actors and extras were involved, transport and sophisticated equipment.

To remove the mouse’s mileage on the floor and the view “with the mouse’s eyes”, technicians from the film crew built a special device - a mini-crane. Also, unusual angles were achieved by placing the GoPro camera inside the duck and in the Soup.

In France, more than 35 French were employed in the film crew. Local filmmakers noted that this is an unprecedented number for a foreign project.

=== Casting ===
Vincent Perez helped Yelena Podkaminskaya and Nikita Tarasov master all the nuances of French pronunciation.

For the role of Nicolas DuPont, the head of the protocol of the French President, the creators considered Vincent Cassel.

=== Filming ===
Principal photography in Paris was complicated by numerous bureaucratic procedures. Literally all the movements of the film crew were regulated by special permissions, the police (both "land" and river) conducted constant checks.

== Release ==
The premiere took place in all cinemas on 1 May 2014 by Central Partnership.

== See also ==
Films and spin-offs

- The Kitchen. The Last Battle (2017), a second feature film
- Hotel Belgrade (2020), a third feature film
