= We (unreleased film) =

- Directed by: Hamlet Dulyan
- Written by: Alexander Talal; Hamlet Dulyan; Yevgeny Zamyatin
- Based on: We (novel) by Yevgeny Zamyatin
- Produced by: Gevond Andreasyan; Sarik Andreasyan; Armen Ananikyan; Hamlet Dulyan; Sergey Aleksanyan
- Starring: Egor Koreshkov; Yelena Podkaminskaya; Yuri Kolokolnikov; Dmitry Chebotaryov; Maryana Spivak; Filipp Yankovsky; Sofia Doniants
- Cinematography: Karen Manaseryan
- Edited by: Irina Bychkova; Tatiana Moreva
- Music by: Michael Afanasyev
- Production companies: K.B.A. (Enjoy Movies); Big Cinema House; Nemesis Films
- Country: Russia
- Language: Russian

We (Russian: Мы) is a Russian dystopian film directed by Hamlet Dulyan, a screen adaptation of the dystopian novel of the same name by Yevgeny Zamyatin, scheduled for release in 2021.

The film was produced by Gevond Andreasyan and Sarik Andreasyan's company K.B.A. (Russian: Кинокомпания братьев Андреасян, romanized: Kinokompaniya brat'yev Andreasyan, lit. 'Andreasyan Brothers Film Company').

== Plot ==
The Great War is over. As a result, most of the population perished. The survivors live in an impeccable, authoritarian One State. Each has its own serial number and uniform. For the D-503 engineer, who builds a super-powerful spacecraft, such a life is ideal. And suddenly he meets a woman, I-330, who radically changes his ideas about himself and awakens uncontrollable feelings.

== Cast ==
- Egor Koreshkov as D-503
- Yelena Podkaminskaya as I-330
- Yuri Kolokolnikov as Panda
- Dmitry Chebotaryov as R-13
- Maryana Spivak as A-2248
- Filipp Yankovsky as S-4711
- Sofia Doniants as O-90

== Production ==
This is the first Russian film adaptation of Zamyatin's novel. The project was initially announced in 2017. Despite the post-production having been completed, the film's release on 1 December 2022 was canceled. No new information has been available since then.
