= Sergey Epishev =

Russian actor

- Сергей Епишев
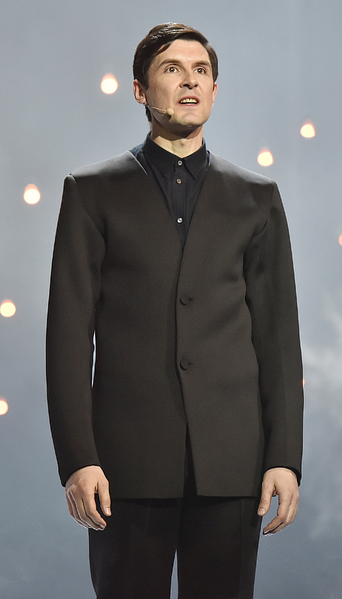
- Epishev hosting the 2017 Golden Mask Award ceremony
- Born: Sergey Malikovich Epishev; 2 July 1979 (age 47); Tashkent, Uzbek SSR, Soviet Union
- Education: Boris Shchukin Theatre Institute
- Occupation: Actor
- Years active: 2002–present

Sergey Malikovich Epishev (Russian: Сергей Маликович Епишев; born 2 July 1979) is a Russian actor of stage, film, and television, and musician.

== Biography ==
Born in Tashkent, Soviet Uzbekistan, Epishev graduated from a theatre school of the Ilkhom Theatre in 1997. In 2001, he graduated from the Boris Shchukin Theatre Institute in Moscow and joined the staff of the Vakhtangov Theatre. He has also participated in stagings at the Theatre of Nations and the Sovremennik Theatre.

== Selected filmography ==
- The Case of "Dead Souls" (2005) as the sergeant / sentry
- Not Born Beautiful (2005–2006) as Boris Rulin, the lawyer
- Crush (2009) as the glitch
- Kitchen (2012–2016) as Lev "Lyova" Solovyov, the sous-chef
- Sklifosovsky (2013) as the maniac
- The Kitchen in Paris (2014) as Lev "Lyova" Solovyov, the sous-chef
- Kitchen. The Last Battle (2017) as Lev "Lyova" Solovyov, the sous-chef
- Gold Diggers (2020) as the forensic surgeon
- The Last Minister (2020–2022) as Ilya Vikentyev, the deputy minister
- The Method 2 (2020) as Gena Belikov
- Aunt Martha (2022) as Ilya Aksenov
- The Librarian (2023) as Denis Lutsis
- The Wizard of the Emerald City (2025) as the Ogre
