= Yulia Takshina =

Russian actress, dancer and model

Yulia Evgenyevna Takshina is a Russian stage and film actress, dancer and model.

== Biography ==
Yulia Takshina was born on July 9, 1980, in Belgorod. At 7 years old she said that she wanted to join the Sovremennik Theatre. When she entered high school, she became interested in journalism and pursued that in Moscow State University. After spending one and a half years there, she dropped out due to being invited by Oleg Gazmanov to join a dance group called the 'Diamond Girls'.

In 2002 she joined the Boris Shchukin's Theatre Institute and under the supervision of Vladimir Poglazov got her diploma by 2006. In 2005 Yulia made her first on screen debut starring as Vika Klachkova in a television series called Ne Rodis Krasivoy (Don't Be Born Beautiful) that gained her a fanbase and partner of 6 years Grigoriy Antipenko, who was cast as the leading character in the show.

By 2007 Antipenko and Takshina were supposed to star in the Pigmalion play however, due to her pregnancy, Yulia was unable to participate and had to give her role up to Olga Lomonosova.

Currently, Takshina works in the Vakhtangov theatre in Moscow and still appears in many film and television projects.

=== Personal life ===
Yulia is currently unmarried but does have two sons Ivan (born June 27, 2007) and Fedor (born July 3, 2009) with Grigory Antipenko. In June 2012, after six years of relationaship, the couple broke up. They met on the set of Ne Rodis Krasivoy (Don't Be Born Beautiful) in 2005

== Filmography ==
Year	Title	Role
2005	Ne Rodis Krasivoy	Vika Klochkova
2007	V Ozhidanii Chuda	Plane passenger
2010	Inadequate people	Marina
2012	The Kitchen	Tatyana
2013	Sledovatel Protasov	Nastya
2013	Diamond In Chocolate	Lyusya
2014	Davay Potseluemsya	Tatyana
2014	Vasilisa	
2015	12 Months. A New Fairytale	Martina
2015	The Pursuit Of 3 Hares	Zhanna
2015	The Murder For 3	Zhanna
2015	Marathon For 3 Graces	Zhanna
2016	Chelovek Bez Proshlogo	Dasha
2016	Three Fellow Deers On a Diamond Path	Zhanna
2017	Perekrestki	Karina
2017	Mousetrap For 3 Persons	Zhanna
2020–2021	Detective Anna II	Polina Anikeeva
2021	Ekipazh 314	Rasskazova
