= Igor Ivanov (actor) =

Soviet and Russian actor

Igor Yuryevich Ivanov
- Born: Igor Yuryevich Ivanov; May 19, 1954 (age 71); Leningrad, RSFSR, USSR (now Saint Petersburg, Russia)
- Occupations: Actor and Director
- Years active: since 1979
- Awards: Honored Artists of RSFSR; People's Artist of Russia
- Website: www.actor-ivanov.com

Igor Yuryevich Ivanov (Russian: Игорь Юрьевич Иванов; born 19 May 1954) is a Soviet and Russian actor of theater and director. He is a People's Artist of Russia (2004).

== Education and work ==
Igor Ivanov graduated 1979 from the Leningrad State Institute of Theatre Music and Cinematography from Katsman's and Dodin's class.

He acted with the Tomsk Young Viewers' Theatre from 1979 till 1980. During the same year became an actor with the well-known Maly Drama Theatre in Saint Petersburg – where he works to this day.

Since 2010 he has lived and worked in Berlin part-time.

== Awards ==
- 2004 – People's Artist of Russia – Honorary Title for Life Achievement in the field of Acting
- 2003 – The Golden Soffit – Award for Male Leading Role in Theatre
- 2003 – Strezhelchik Award – Award for Life Achievement in Theatre
- 2002 – The International Stanislavski Award of the Russian Federation – Award for Male Leading Role in Theatre
- 1991 – Honored Artist RSFSR

== Selected work in theatre ==
- Intrigue and Love, President Walter – MDT – Theatre de l'Europe, Lev Dodin
- Long Journey into the night, James Tyron – MDT – Theatre de l'Europe, Lev Dodin
- Life and Fate, Mostovskoy – MDT – Theatre de l'Europe, Lev Dodin
- Love's Labors's lost, Don Adriano de Armado – MDT – Theatre de l'Europe, Lev Dodin
- Uncle Vanya, Alexander Serebrjakov – MDT – Theatre de l'Europe, Lev Dodin
- The Cherry Orchard, Lopachin – MDT – Theatre de l'Europe, Lev Dodin
- The Disappearance, Baruch Najleben – MDT – Theatre de l'Europe, Jurij Kordonski
- The Broken Jug, Consultant Walter – MDT – Theatre de l'Europe, Benjamin Felshtinski
- Desire Under The Elms, Simon – MDT – Theatre de l'Europe, Lev Dodin
- Devils, Captain Lebyadkin – MDT – Theatre de l'Europe, Lev Dodin
- Fiesta, Bill Gorton – MDT – Theatre de l'Europe, Efim Padve
- Brothers and Sisters, Piotr Zhitov – MDT – Theatre de l'Europe, Lev Dodin
- Stars on the Morningsky, Nikolai – MDT – Theatre de l'Europe – Lev Dodin
- The House, Jegorsha – MDT – Theatre de l'Europe – Lev Dodin

== Selected work in film ==
Film
| Year | Title | Role |
|---|---|---|
| 1980 | Ostrov Sokrovish (Treasure Island) | Pirate |
| 1982 | Kazhdyi desjaty (Every tenth) | Mizinchik |
| 1982 | Po konjam (To the Horses) | Kirill Mishin |
| 1983 | Ukradenoe Svedanije (Stolen Date) | Former Inmate |
| 1983 | Believe It or Not (The Never-Was) | Frand |
| 1990 | Nikolai Vavilov | Semyon Petrovich Sheludko |
| 2005 | Yesenin | Colonel Loman |
| 2009 | Besy (Dostoyevski's Devils) | Captain Lebyadkin |
| 2009 | Opergruppa (Operative group) | Jurij Mahrov |
| 2009 | Pyesa bez nazvanija (The nameless play) | Glagoleev |
| 2010 | Podvodnye Kamniy (Underwater stones) | Laptev |
| 2011 | Vozmezdia (Revenge) | Chef Max |
| 2011 | Vtoraja Ljubov (Second love) | Genadij Solovev |
| 2011 | Gosudarvstvenaya Zashita (Witness Protection) | Boris Povstaniz |
| 2011 | Majakovski – 2 Dnja (Majakovski – 2 Days) | Konstantin Stanislawski |
| 2011 | Chyasi ljubvi (The clock of love) | Kerber |
| 2011 | Naruzhnoe nabljudenie (Surveillance) | Vladimir Sumin |
| 2011 | Putj na sever (Way to the north) | Boris Shepkin |
| 2012 | Provinzial (The Provincial) | Mikhail Makeev |
| 2012 | Stranstviye Sindbada (Sindbad's journey) | Boris Shepkin |
| 2013 | Mer polizii (The mayor of police) | Uglanov |
| 2013 | Vse nachalosj v Harbine (It all started in Harbin) | Nikolai Eborzhenko |
| 2014 | Kuhnja v Parizhe (The Kitchen in Paris) | Sergey, the chief of protocol of the Russian president |
| 2017 | Mata Hari | Maitre Clunet |
| 2017 | Kuhnja. Poslednyaya bitva (Kitchen. The Last Battle) | Sergey, the chief of protocol of the Russian president |
| 2021 | Mayor Grom: Chumnoy Doktor (Major Grom: Plague Doctor) | judge Sergey Bengalsky |
| 2022 | Aeterna | Professor Shabli |
