= Project Gemini (film) =

- Directed by: Serik Beyseu
- Written by: Natalia Lebedeva; Dmitry Zhigalov
- Produced by: Viktor Denisyuk; Yevgeny Melentev; Dmitry Sushchenko; Aleksandr Boguslavsky
- Starring: Egor Koreshkov; Alyona Konstantinova; Konstantin Samoukov; Nikita Dyuvbanov; Elizaveta Martinez Kardenaz; Viktor Potapeshkin; Dmitry Frid; Pyotr Romanov
- Cinematography: Kirill Zotkin
- Edited by: Serik Beyseu
- Music by: Konstantin Poznekov
- Production company: KinoDanz (KD Studios)
- Distributed by: Nashe Kino
- Release date: January 6, 2022
- Running time: 98 minutes
- Country: Russia
- Languages: Russian; English
- Budget: $6,5 million
- Box office: ₽5 million

Project Gemini (Russian: Звёздный разум) is a 2022 Russian science fiction thriller film directed by Serik Beyseu about a space mission sent to terraform a distant planet. However, the mission encounters something unknown that has its own plan for the planet. The film stars Egor Koreshkov, Alyona Konstantinova, Konstantin Samoukov, Nikita Dyuvbanov, Elizaveta Martinez Kardenaz, Viktor Potapeshkin, Dmitry Frid, Pyotr Romanov, and Aleksandr Kuznetsov.

Principal photography commenced in 2016, the film was shot in Moscow, Russia and Kazakhstan, the locations chosen were deliberately futuristic, so that the viewer had no doubts that the film was set in the future. For a believable transfer of the atmosphere of a spacecraft and a number of fantastic elements, the film crew traveled to Star City, Russia.

It was released on January 6, 2022, by "Nashe Kino" (English: "Our Cinema").

== Plot ==
In the future, a virus is killing all plants on earth, the oxygen level is at 18% and humans are going to suffocate. But some scientists discover an ancient machine called the Sphere, which they believe created life on Earth, and a warp drive developed by the same civilization. So a group of international scientists, including Steve, launches Project Gemini. They will bring a copy of the Sphere to a terraformable Planet. But during the journey, there's a problem with the warp drive, and so they stop before planned, near a young planet, with an unstable and thin atmosphere and a temperature of 16 °C, so they need to wear oxygen masks outside the ship. The pilot is suspended from work by Steve, who tells him not to go to check the engine. The pilot goes anyway, and moments later the crew sees him dead, outside the window of the ship. So they decide to accelerate the schedule and descend to the planet. Steve is suspended because of the pilot's death. We see a flashback of Steve giving his girlfriend Amy a bracelet made of a piece of the original Sphere. Back on the planet, they put the Sphere into a cave and activate it, which starts to create a sustainable environment. But they discover the Sphere released a Trojan, a bio-robot alien, which tries to come into the lander. So Steve and a member of the crew return to the cave to check the Sphere without the permission of the captain. The captain shows the crew a video proving that Steve had always known about the Sphere's anomaly which created the Trojan. In the video, we see Steve interacting with some human-shaped holograms. The Trojan attacks and infects a crew member and Steve realises that they didn't travel through space but through time. They're now four billion years in the past on a young Earth before the beginning of life itself. Back to the present, after studying the crew member's blood, Steve discovers the clue to the vaccine that could save the Earth, so he engraves the piece of Sphere that he will use to make his wife's bracelet with the vaccine's formula. He decides to blow up the lander to destroy the Trojan. Back in the future, Amy finds the formula on the bracelet and activates the first Sphere. We see her interacting with a human-shape hologram, who's Steve from the past. After a last farewell and some instructions to create the vaccine, Steve puts off the oxygen mask and dies, saving humanity.

== Cast ==
- Egor Koreshkov as Dr. Steven Ross (Steve)
- Alyona Konstantinova as Amy
- Konstantin Samoukov as Ryan Connell, captain
- Nikita Dyuvbanov as Frank Miller
- Elizaveta Martinez Kardenaz as Leona Redwood
- Viktor Potapeshkin as Richard Wilson
- Dmitry Frid as David Kurtz, an scientist assistant
- Pyotr Romanov as Peter Lehmann
- Aleksandr Kuznetsov

== Production ==
The project was directed by Serik Beyseu, previously acted as an Editor of other films. Only editing and working with of the directors of the genre could reflect the real picture of life on board the ship sent into space. This applies, including the landing on other planets. There is an unverifiable claim that "Vyacheslav Lisnevsky" wrote the script in collaboration with Dmitry Zhigalov on the original production idea. Producers Viktor Denisyuk and Yevgeny Melentev's company KD Studios.

=== Filming ===
Filming took place in Russia and Kazakhstan for 2 months.

The movie was shot in Moscow at specially selected locations: a recently built business center Comcity office park, in the territory of Moscow-City, near Aquamarine residential complex at Ozerkovskaya embankment, which are located on the territory of the Russian capital. Not without consultations with experts, astronauts, during a visit to the Star City, Russia. Scenery of another planet where, according to the story, a team of astronauts was sent, were shot at Charyn Canyon in Kazakhstan.

As for the spacecraft, the flight and landing frames of another planet, they will be fully modeled on a computer.

=== Production ===
At the studio large-scale stage scenery of a paleontological cave site and a space ship's interior was built in the pavilion. Particularly careful work from the artists required unique costumes, including space suits for the astronauts, as well as futuristic gadgets, smart phones and weapons.

The exterior of spaceship and scenes of flight and landing on the other planet will be completely computer-rendered. Visual effects in the movie will be produced by KinoDanz's own computer graphics studio.

== Release ==
The film was initially scheduled to premiere in Russia by 20th Century Studios CIS in April 2019. Later this was postponed.
