= Kitchen. The Last Battle =

2017 film by Anton Fedotov

- Theatrical release poster
- Directed by: Anton Fedotov
- Written by: Pavel Danilov; Vasiliy Kutsenko; Vitaliy Shlyappo; Igor Tudvasev; Dmitriy Yan
- Produced by: Eduard Iloyan; Aleksandr Kushaev; Vasiliy Kutsenko; Matija Matovic Mondi; Vitaliy Shlyappo; Aleksey Trotsyuk; Denis Zhalinskiy
- Starring: Dmitry Nazarov; Dmitry Nagiev; Sergey Lavygin; Mikhail Tarabukin; Anfisa Chernykh; Kirill Kovbas
- Cinematography: Pasha Kapinos
- Edited by: Tim Pavelko
- Music by: Ivan Kanayev
- Distributed by: Central Partnership
- Release date: 20 April 2017
- Running time: 114 minutes
- Country: Russia
- Language: Russian

Kitchen. The Last Battle (Russian: Кухня. Последняя битва, romanized: Kukhnya. Poslednyaya bitva) is a Russian comedy film directed by Anton Fedotov. It stars Dmitry Nazarov and Dmitry Nagiev. The premiere of the film in Russia was on 20 April 2017.

== Plot ==
Viktor Barinov and his team are sent to the world championship among cooks at the request of the President of Russia. He will have to help his son, a fact Victor will find out on the eve of the championship.

== Cast ==
- Dmitry Nazarov as Viktor Barinov
- Dmitry Nagiev as Dmitriy Nagiev
- Sergey Lavygin as Arseniy Chuganin
- Mikhail Tarabukin as Fyodor Yurchenko
- Anfisa Chernykh as Anna
- Kirill Kovbas as Ivan
- Sergey Epishev as Lev Solovyov
- Nikita Tarasov as Louis Benoit
- Mikhail Bashkatov as Denis Krylov
- Marina Mogilevskaya as Yelena Sokolova
- Valeriya Fedorovich as Yekaterina Semyonova
- Oleg Tabakov as Pyotr Barinov
- Grigory Siyatvinda as Mikhail Dzhekovich
- Alexander Andrievich as Elen Ducasse
- Diana Pozharskaya as Dasha
- Olga Kuzmina as Nastya
- Igor Ivanov as Sergey Sergeyevich
- Anton Lapenko as announcer
- Valeriy Afanasev as Hotel Guest
- Svetlana Zeynalovaи as news anchor (cameo)
- Andrey Malakhov as host of the World Culinary Championship (cameo)
- Leonid Leykin as cameo
