= Yelena Ksenofontova =

Russian actress

- Born: Yelena Yuryevna Ksenofontova; December 17, 1972 (age 53); Khromtau, Kazakh SSR, USSR
- Occupation: Actress
- Years active: 1992–present
- Spouse(s): Igor Lipatov (m.1994-?); Ilya Neretin (m.2003-?; 1 child)
- Partner(s): Alexander (d.?-present; 1 child)
- Children: Timofei Neretin (b. 2003); Sophia (b. 2011)
- Parent: Yury Ksenofontov
- Website: Official website

Yelena Yuryevna Ksenofontova (Russian: Еле́на Ю́рьевна Ксенофо́нтова; born on December 17, 1972) is a Russian stage and film actress and an Honored Artist of Russia (2006).

== Personal life ==
In 1994, Ksenofontova married Igor Lipatov, but their marriage ended in divorce. In 2003, she married Ilya Neretin, but they later divorced. They have one child, a son named Timofei Neretin (b. 2003). Currently, she is in a relationship with a man named Alexandr and they have one child, a daughter, Sophia (born on February 10, 2011).

In the 1990s, Ksenofontova was diagnosed with brain cancer a few times.

She lives and works in Moscow.
