= Boris Shchukin Theatre Institute =

Drama school in Moscow

Coordinates: 55.7517°N 37.5906°E

- Театральный институт имени Бориса Щукина
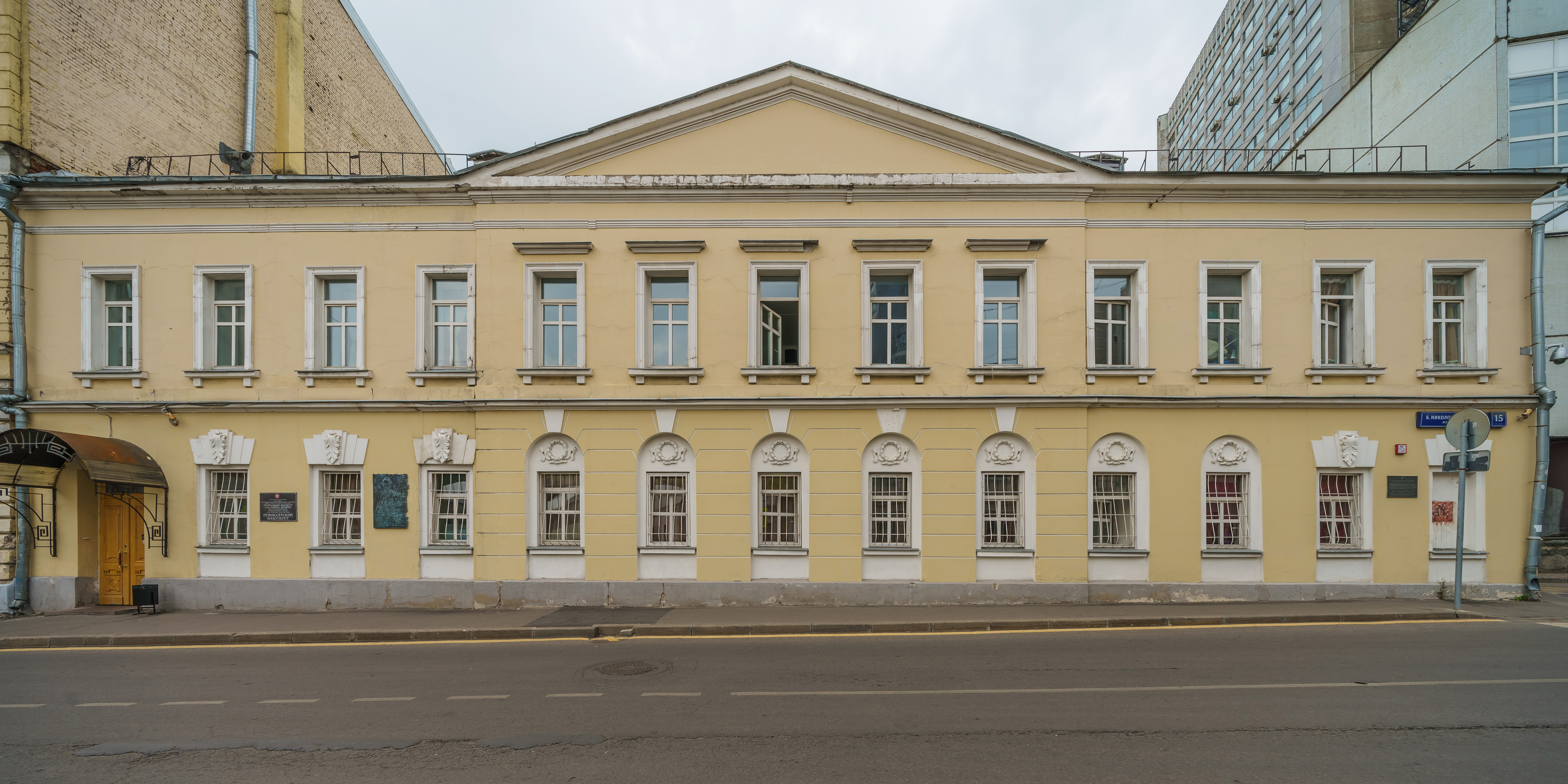
- Former names: Moscow Evgeny Vakhtangov Drama School; The Moscow Art Theatre's Third Studio
- Type: Public
- Established: October 23, 1914
- Director: Yevgeny Knyazev
- Location: Moscow, Russia, Russian Federation
- Campus: Urban
- Website: www.htvs.ru

The Boris Shchukin Theatre Institute (Russian: Театральный институт имени Бориса Щукина) is a Russian drama college in Moscow, formed in 1914 as part of the Vakhtangov Theatre. In 2002 it was granted the academy status.

== History ==
The history of the Shchukin Institute (or Shchuka, The Pike, as it is informally known) goes back to November 1913, when a group of Moscow art students formed their own studio and invited actor and director Evgeny Vakhtangov to become their leader. October 23, 1914, when the latter held his first class with the group (then called the Mansurova School, after the street it was standing on), is celebrated as the Vakhtangov Academy's official birthday. In the spring of 1917 the Studio was named the Moscow Evgeny Vakhtangov Drama School, in 1920 it became the Moscow Art Theatre’s Third Studio and in 1926 (after the death of Vakhtangov in 1922) it became part of the newly formed Vakhtangov Theatre, with Boris Zakhava at the helm (1926–1948, 1962–1967). In 1932 the Studio got the status of a secondary school, then in 1939 it was given the name of Boris Shchukin, Vakhtangov's best-loved student. In 1945 it received the status of a higher education institution and has been known since as the Shchukin Theatre College of Higher education. In 1986 the college's director became Vladimir Etush (still its Arts director). In 2002 the institute was granted the academy status. In 2003 professor Yevgeny Knyazev became its head.

== Notable students ==
- Marina Aleksandrova (born 1982)
- Mariya Aronova (born 1972)
- Nina Arkhipova (1921–2016)
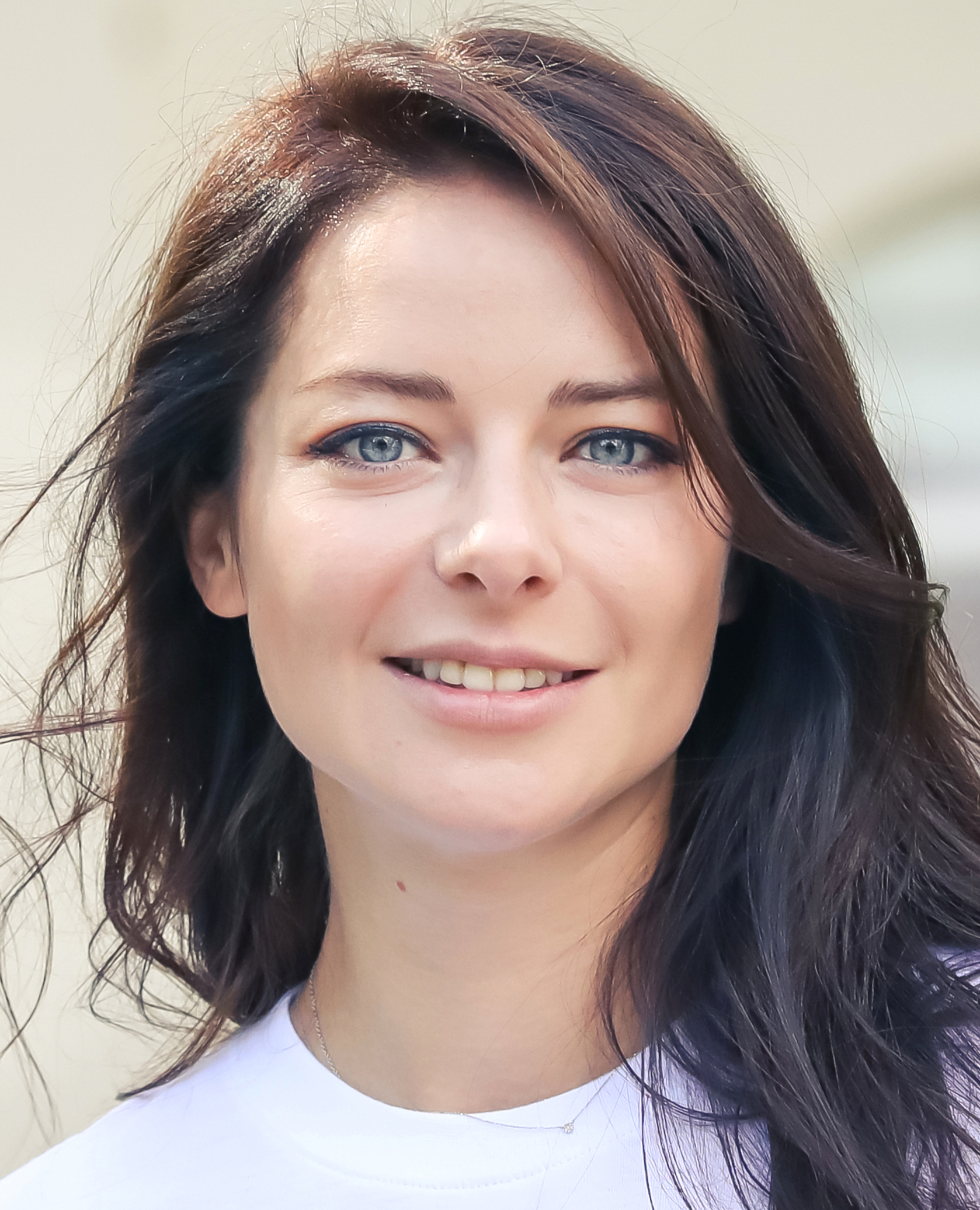
  Marina Aleksandrova
- Yan Arlazorov (1947–2009)
- Maksim Averin (born 1975)
- Natalia Bardo (born 1988)
- Olga Barnet (1951–2021)
- Aleksandr Belyavsky (1932–2012)
- Yury Belyayev (born 1947)
- Galina Belyayeva (born 1961)
- Leonid Bichevin (born 1984)
- Yuri Bogatyryov (1947–1989)
- Lev Borisov (1933–2011)
- Yuliya Borisova (born 1925)
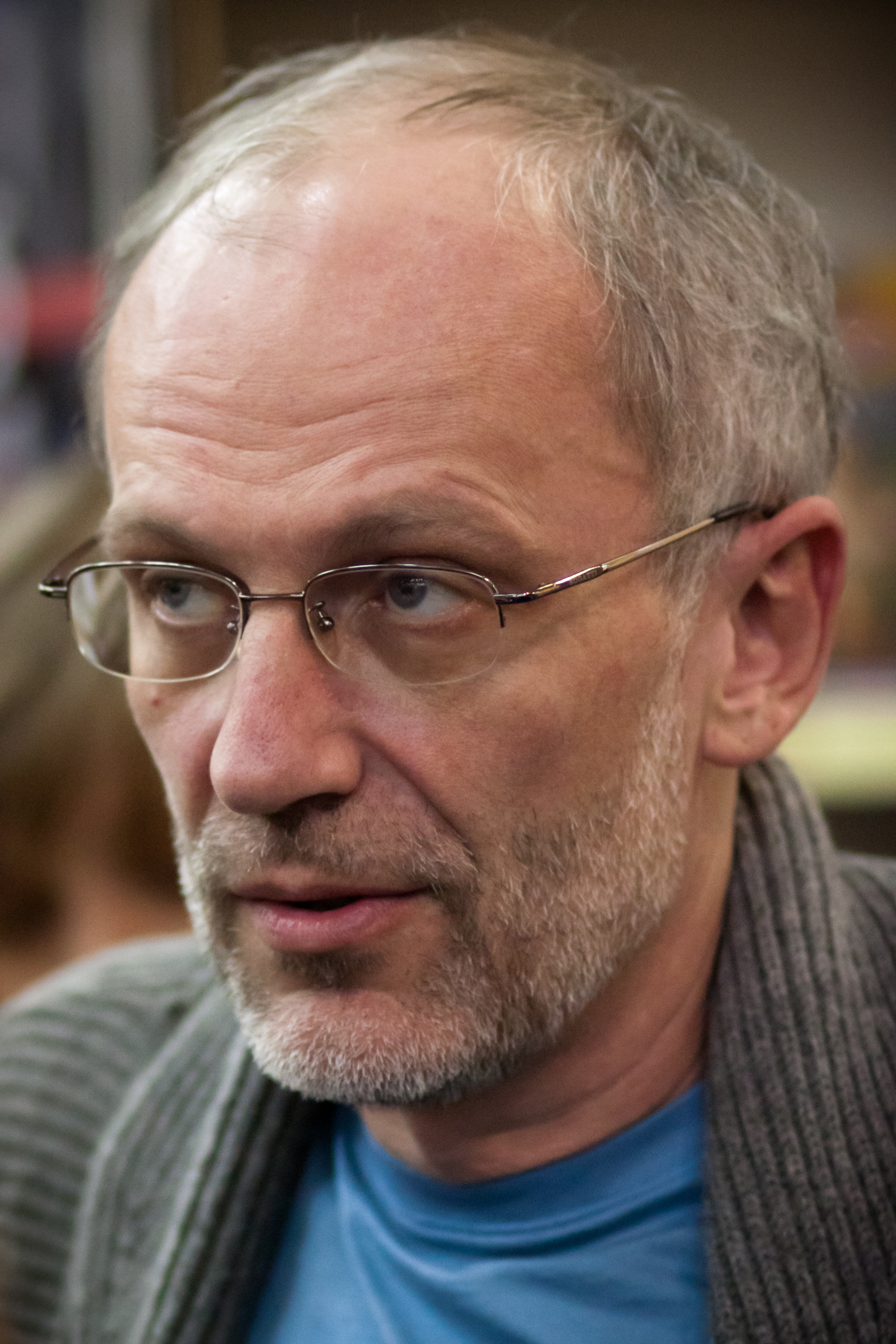
  Alexander Gordon
- Ivan Bortnik (born 1939)
- Olga Budina (born 1975)
- Nikolai Burlyayev (born 1946)
- Sergey Burunov (born 1977)
- Rolan Bykov (1929–1998)
- Lyudmila Chursina (born 1941)
- Mikhail Derzhavin (1936–2018)
- Viktor Dobronravov (born 1983)
- Stanislav Duzhnikov (born 1973)
- Nikita Dzhigurda (born 1961)
- Arthur Eisen (1927–2008)
- Vladimir Epifantsev (born 1971)
- Sergey Epishev (born 1979)
- Vladimir Etush (1922–2019)
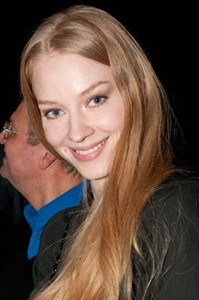
  Svetlana Khodchenkova
- Leonid Filatov (1946–2003)
- Aleksandr Filippenko (born 1944)
- Vladislav Galkin (1971–2010)
- Irina Gorbacheva (born 1988)
- Alexander Gordon (born 1964)
- Nonna Grishayeva (born 1971)
- Natalya Gundareva (1948–2005)
- Yekaterina Guseva (born 1976)
- Alla Demidova (born 1936)
- Mikhail Derzhavin (1936–2018)
- Nikita Dzhigurda (born 1961)
- Ivan Dykhovichny (1947–2009)
- Alexander Kaidanovsky (1946–1995)
- Alexander Kalyagin (born 1942)
- Leonid Kanevsky (born 1939)
- Kirill Käro (born 1975)
- Boris Khmelnitsky (1940–2008)
- Svetlana Khodchenkova (born 1983)
- Yevgeny Knyazev (born 1955)
- Mikhail Kokshenov (1936–2020)
- Yuri Kolokolnikov (born 1980)
- Yelena Koreneva (born 1953)
- Irina Kupchenko (born 1948)
- Sergey Kurginyan (born 1949)
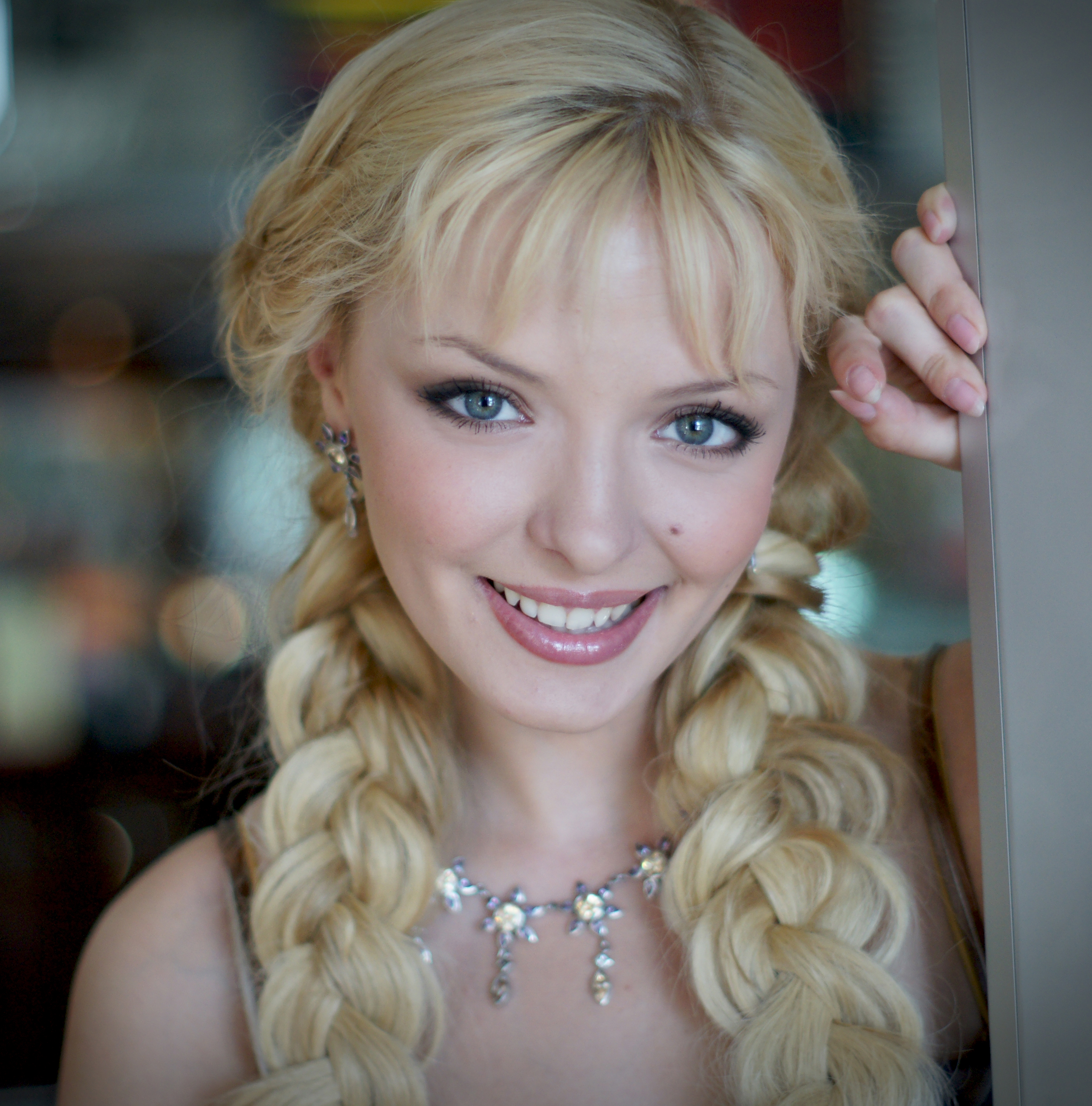
  Marina Orlova
- Vasily Lanovoy (born 1934)
- Vasily Livanov (born 1935)
- Alexey Lysenkov (born 1965)
- Yuri Lyubimov (1917–2014)
- Sergei Makovetsky (born 1958)
- Lyudmila Maksakova (born 1940)
- Masha Mashkova (born 1985)
- Nikita Mikhalkov (born 1945)
- Andrey Mironov (1941–1987)
- Yuriy Nazarov (born 1937)
- Alexander Oleshko (born 1976)
- Marina Orlova (born 1986)
- Yelena Podkaminskaya (born 1979)
- Olga Pogodina (born 1976)
- Aleksandr Porokhovshchikov (1939–2012)
- Konstantin Raikin (born 1950)
- Mark Rudinstein (1946–2021)
- Nina Ruslanova (born 1945)
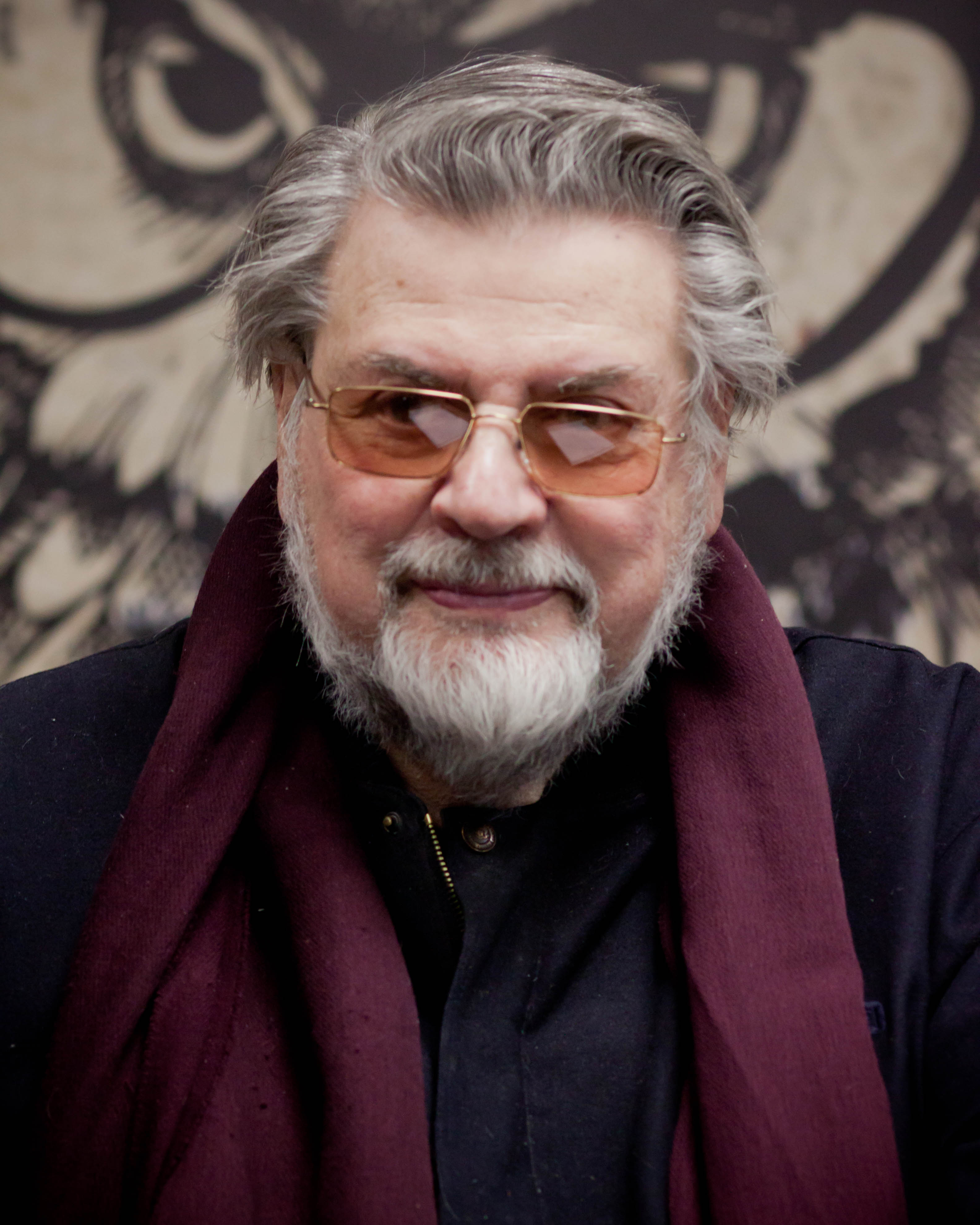
  Alexander Shirvindt
- Yuliya Rutberg (born 1965)
- Tatiana Samoylova (1934–2014)
- Natalya Sayko (born 1948)
- Natalya Seleznyova (born 1945)
- Vyacheslav Shalevich (1934–2016)
- Aleksandr Shirvindt (born 1934)
- Vladimir Simonov (1957–2025)
- Yevgeniya Simonova (born 1955)
- Grigory Siyatvinda (born 1970)
- Veniamin Smekhov (born 1940)
- Valentin Smirnitsky (born 1944)
- Yevgeny Steblov (born 1945)
- Maksim Sukhanov (born 1963)
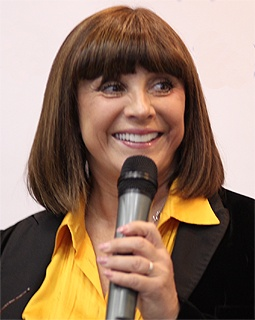
  Natalya Varley
- Lyudmila Tselikovskaya (1919–1992)
- Mikhail Ulyanov (1927–2007)
- Sergei Ursuliak (born 1958)
- Nina Usatova (born 1951)
- Natalya Varley (born 1947)
- Anastasiya Vertinskaya (born 1944)
- Yuri Volyntsev (1932–1999)
- Ivan Vyrypaev (born 1974)
- Zinovy Vysokovsky (1932–2009)
- Yury Yakovlev (1928–2013)
- Leonid Yarmolnik (born 1954)
- Alexandra Zakharova (born 1962)
- Aleksandr Zbruyev (born 1938)
- Sergey Zhigunov (born 1963)
- Tikhon Zhiznevsky (born 1988)
- Viktor Zozulin (1944–2022)
