= Ekaterina Starshova =

Russian actress (born 2001)

- Екатерина Старшова
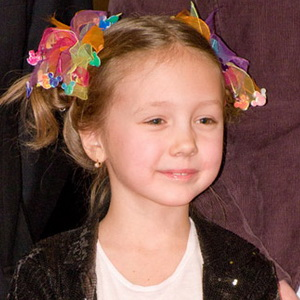
- Teen actresses Katya Starshova in 2009
- Born: Ekaterina Igorevna Starshova; 28 October 2001 (age 23); Moscow, Russia
- Years active: 2007–present

Ekaterina "Katya" Igorevna Starshova (Russian: Екатерина "Катя" Игоревна Старшова; born 28 October 2001) is a Russian actress known for playing the role of Polina "Pugovka" Vasnetsova in the Russian sitcom Daddy's Daughters.

== Early life ==
Katya Starshova was born on October 28, 2001, in Moscow. She currently participates in the Junior Ballet on Ice 'Aleko'. She represented Russia in an international dance competition in Paris and reached second place.

== Acting career ==
In 2007, the then 6-year old Starshova was given the role of Polina "Pugovka" Vasnetsova in the Russian TV series Daddy's Daughters (Russian: Папины дочки), alongside Andrei Leonov, Nonna Grishaeva, Miroslava Karpovich, Anastasia Sivaeva, Darya Melnikova and Elizaveta Arzamasova.

Starshova has also appeared in commercials and other TV shows. In 2009, she played Tanya in Black Lightning (Russian: Чёрная Молния).

== Filmography ==
- 2007–2013: Daddy's Daughters TV series as Polina "Pugovka" Vasnetsova
- 2007: Mermaid
- 2009: Black Lightning as Tanya Maykova
