= List of Fantasy Patrol episodes =

Fantasy Patrol is a Russian animated fantasy web television series created by Vadim Volya and Evgeniy Golovin. The series premiered on the multi-series newsreel, Moolt in Cinema on April 30, 2016, and was later released to YouTube on May 19, 2016.

== Series overview ==
Season	Episodes	Originally released	
Season	Episodes	First released	Last released
1	26	April 30, 2016	December 14, 2018
2	26	February 16, 2019	February 5, 2021
Chronicles	78	August 2, 2019	TBA
3	26	February 12, 2021	TBA
Film		2021	

== Episodes ==
=== Season 1 (2016–18) ===
No.	Title	Directed by	Written by	Original release date	English release date	Prod. code
1	"The Beginning" "Знакомство"	Nail Mubinov	Maria Parfenova and Evgeny Golovin	April 30, 2016 (Moolt in Cinema) September 1, 2018 (Toons in Cinemas); May 19, 2016 (YouTube)	January 31, 2017	101
Three friends Mary, Valery & Snowy visit a fairytale town, where they meet Helena. After defeating a monster, they team up to keep magic forces at bay and maintain peace in the real world.
2	"Cat-and-Mouse" "Кошки-мышки"	Nail Mubinov	Maria Parfenova, Evgeny Golovin, and Anton Lanshakov	July 5, 2016 (Moolt); July 22, 2016 (YouTube)	January 31, 2017	102
The four girls have to stop the Mouse King's advisor's evil plan to send the Mouse King back to the moon.
3	"Everybody Dance Now!" "Танцуют все!"	Nail Mubinov	Maria Parfenova and Evgeny Golovin	September 16, 2016 (Moolt in Cinema) (Toons in Cinemas); September 23, 2018 (YouTube)	February 1, 2017	103
Jimmy the Genie escapes from an arcade machine and plunges Fableton into chaos by causing the townsfolk to dance. The fairies challenge him to a dance-off.
4	"How to Become a Star" "Как стать звездой"	Nail Mubinov, Anastasia Chernova, and Tatyana Bolotnova	Maria Parfenova and Evgeny Golovin	November 18, 2016 (Moolt app) (Toons in Cinemas Special); November 28, 2018 (YouTube)	February 6, 2017	104
The townsfolk hurry to see the famous Puppeteer's concert. While they are all there, his minions steal the town's magic creatures.
5	"Make a Wish!" "Загадай желание!"	Nail Mubinov and Anastasia Chernova	Maria Parfenova and Evgeny Golovin	December 27, 2016 (Moolt app) (Toons In Cinemas Special Holidays); December 31, 2018 (YouTube)	June 24, 2017	105
Mary finds a magic cactus that grants her 33 wishes. She uses them all to tweak the girl's performance, but Helena, Snowy, and Valery turn into a Christmas tree after the play.
6	"Everything Is Under Control" "Всё под контролем!"	Nail Mubinov and Marina Nefyodova	Maria Parfenova and Evgeny Golovin	March 10, 2017 (Moolt app); April 1, 2017 (Moolt in Cinema and YouTube)	January 25, 2018	106
Elizabeth Wise comes to inspect after the Phantom escapes from prison, but the Cat shows her that everything is under control. Moments after she leaves, the real Elizabeth arrives.
7	"A Runaway Hut" "Кто в теремочке живёт?"	Nail Mubinov, Svetlana Tugabay, Tatyana Bolotnova, Alexey Lukyanchikov, and Alexey Sudakov	Maria Parfenova	June 11, 2017 (Moolt app); June 22, 2017 (YouTube); July 22, 2017 (Moolt in Cinema)	February 26, 2018	107
Elizabeth Wise dismisses the Cat when she finds that he gave all Fableton's secrets to the Phantom who was in disguise. The Fantasy Patrol is given the guardian job and set off on their first mission.
8	"Light My Fire" "Гори – гори ясно!"	Svetlana Tugaybey	Maria Parfenova and Julia Ivanova	July 17, 2017 (Moolt app); August 19, 2017 (Moolt in Cinema); August 24, 2017 (YouTube)	March 27, 2018	108
When Helena haves the dream of her being a queen and having the ability to control fire, she oversleeps and when she rushes to meet the girls she stumbles upon an oven that makes the cookies and fixes the magical oven, she is given the magical key bracelet that lets her control fire, she accidentally frees some firelings
9	"Upside Down" "Всё кувырком"	Alexey Ignatov	Maria Parfenova	August 25, 2017 (Moolt app); September 30, 2017 (Moolt in Cinema); October 5, 2017 (YouTube)	April 10, 2018	109
Helena have the dream again only that she is dancing in a magical place and wakes up to find everything is mixed up and Snowy thinks that she is the phenix and the Fantasy Patrol (except Snowy) must restore all the fairytales back in order in the old magical library.
10	"The Big Day" "Большой день"	Alexey Ignatov	Maria Parfenova	September 27, 2017 (Moolt app); October 14, 2017 (Moolt in Cinema); October 20, 2017 (YouTube)	May 10, 2018	110
It's Helena's birthday and she rushes to get a birthday cake from the Cat's store and accidentally eats a cupcake with reducine and the girls must figure out how to get her back to normal before her birthday and Helena is given to her by her grandmother the baby rattle she was holding when she was a baby.
11	"Four Dragonsitters" "У четырёх нянек"	Svetlana Tugaybey	Maria Parfenova	October 20, 2017 (Moolt app); November 11, 2017 (Moolt in Cinema); November 17, 2017 (YouTube)	June 7, 2018	111
Baba Yaga ask the Fantasy Patrol to watch a dragon egg and trouble ensures when the egg hatches and eat everything in its path.
12	"The Looking-Glass" "Зазеркалье"	Alexey Ignatov	Maria Parfenova and Jordan Kefalidi	November 17, 2017 (Moolt app); December 9, 2017 (Moolt in Cinema); December 21, 2017 (YouTube)	June 19, 2018	112
The episode starts when Helena wakes up & there was nothing right.
13	"The Prophecy" "Пророчество"	Svetlana Tugaybey and Ekaterina Rodina	Maria Parfenova	December 15, 2017 (Moolt app); January 4, 2018 (Moolt in Cinema); January 11, 2018 (YouTube)	June 28, 2018	113
Helena was invited in a magic show & has to show her talent. But her magic stick was stolen by her fire girls. Mary, Valery & Snowy help Helena to get back her magic stick.
14	"A Gift from the Dungeons" "Подарок подземелья"	Svetlana Tugaybey and Ekaterina Rodina	Maria Parfenova	January 18, 2018 (Moolt app); February 3, 2018 (Moolt in Cinema); February 16, 2018 (YouTube)	July 18, 2019	114
15	"Dancing Queen" "Королева бала"	Alexey Ignatov	Maria Parfenova	February 9, 2018 (Moolt app); March 3, 2018 (Moolt in Cinema); March 16, 2018 (YouTube)	August 27, 2019	115
16	"Under the Water" "Под водой"	Alexey Ignatov	Maria Parfenova	March 23, 2018 (Moolt app); April 14, 2018 (Moolt in Cinema); April 28, 2018 (YouTube)	October 1, 2019	116
The Fantasy Patrol go underwater to figure out what is causing the fountain to freeze in the middle of summer and Snowy get the magical key bracelet of water.
17	"Return of the Bunny" "Возвращение Зайки"	Svetlana Tugaybey, Mikhail Milotorsky, and Elena Phillipik	Maria Parfenova	April 13, 2018 (Moolt app); May 12, 2018 (Moolt in Cinema); May 25, 2018 (YouTube)	November 27, 2019	117
Snowy's bunny suddenly appears and it now can move.
18	"Magic Forest" "Волшебный лес"	Svetlana Tugaybey, Mikhail Milotovsky, Alexey Sudakov, and Anastasia Chernova	Maria Parfenova	April 28, 2018 (Moolt app); May 26, 2018 (Moolt in Cinema); June 9, 2018 (YouTube)	February 27, 2020	118
19	"Snowy-White" "Бело-Снежка"	Anastasia Chernova, Svetlana Tugaybey, Mikhail Milotovsky, and Alexey Sudakov	Maria Parfenova	June 10, 2018 (Moolt app); June 23, 2018 (Moolt in Cinema); August 7, 2018 (YouTube)	TBA	119
20	"Masquerade" "Маскарад"	Alexey Ignatov	Maria Parfenova	July 7, 2018 (Moolt app); August 18, 2018 (Moolt in Cinema); September 1, 2018 (YouTube)	TBA	120
21	"A Fiery Guest" "Огненный гость"	Svetlana Tugaybey, Alexey Sudakov, and Daria Rud	Maria Parfenova	August 10, 2018 (Moolt app); September 15, 2018 (Moolt in Cinema); September 21, 2018 (YouTube)	TBA	121
22	"Snow Queen" "Снежная королева"	Anastasia Chernova, Svetlana Tugaybey, Mikhail Milotovsky, and Alexey Sudakov	Maria Parfenova	August 31, 2018 (Moolt app); September 29, 2018 (Moolt in Cinema); October 12, 2018 (YouTube)	TBA	122
23	"DJ" "Ди-джей"	Svetlana Tugaybey, Daria Rud, and Anastasia Chernova	Maria Parfenova	October 5, 2018 (Moolt app); October 27, 2018 (Moolt in Cinema); November 9, 2018 (YouTube)	TBA	123
24	"Best Friends" "Лучшие друзья"	Svetlana Tugaybey, Anastasia Chernova, and Mikhail Milotovsky	Maria Parfenova	November 2, 2018 (Moolt app); November 24, 2018 (Moolt in Cinema); December 6, 2018 (YouTube)	TBA	124
25	"Getting Ready" "Долгие сборы"	Svetlana Tugaybey, Anastasia Chernova, and Mikhail Milotovsky	Maria Parfenova	November 23, 2018 (Moolt app); December 8, 2018 (Moolt in Cinema); December 25, 2018 (YouTube)	TBA	125
26	"The Secret of the Magic Café" "Тайна Лукоморья"	Alexey Ignatov	Maria Parfenova	December 14, 2018 (Moolt app); January 5, 2019 (Moolt in Cinema); January 18, 2019 (YouTube)	TBA	126

=== Season 2 (2019–20) ===
No. overall	No. in season	Title	Directed by	Written by	Original release date	English release date	Prod. code
27	1	"The Magic City" "Волшебный город"	Svetlana Tugaybey	Maria Parfenova	February 16, 2019 (Moolt app); March 1, 2019 (Moolt in Cinema); March 7, 2019 (YouTube)	TBA	201
28	2	"The Fairy Teller" "Сказочник"	Alexey Ignatov	Maria Parfenova	March 7, 2019 (Moolt app); March 16, 2019 (Moolt in Cinema); March 30, 2019 (YouTube)	TBA	202
29	3	"Welcome to Magical World!" "Волшебный мир, встречай!"	Mikhail Milotovsky	Maria Parfenova	March 30, 2019 (Moolt in Cinema); April 5, 2019 (Moolt app); April 12, 2019 (YouTube)	TBA	203
30	4	"No bold pot" "Горшочек, не вари"	Mikhail Milotovsky	Maria Parfenova	April 26, 2019 (Moolt app); April 27, 2019 (Moolt in Cinema); May 10, 2019 (YouTube)	TBA	204
31	5	"Magical Botany" "Волшебная ботаника"	Svetlana Tugaybey, Mikhail Milotovsky, and Polina Morozova	Maria Parfenova	May 31, 2019 (Moolt app); June 22, 2019 (Moolt in Cinema); June 24, 2019 (YouTube)	TBA	205
32	6	"The Salamandr land" "Страна саламандр"	Svetlana Tugaybey, Mikhail Milotovsky, Polina Morozova, and Daria Rud	Maria Parfenova	June 28, 2019 (Moolt app); July 20, 2019 (Moolt in Cinema); July 25, 2019 (YouTube)	TBA	206
33	7	"Gingerbread house" "Пряничный домик"	Alexey Ignatov	Maria Parfenova	August 9, 2019 (Moolt app); August 17, 2019 (Moolt in Cinema); September 2, 2019 (YouTube)	TBA	207
34	8	"The visiting Dracula" "В гостях у Дракулы"	Alexey Ignatov and Polina Morozova	Maria Parfenova	August 23, 2019 (Moolt app); September 14, 2019 (Moolt in Cinema); September 27, 2019 (YouTube)	TBA	208
35	9	"Jonny worst day!" "Бон вояж!"	Alexey Ignatov, Daria Rud, and Anastasia Chernova	Maria Parfenova and Natalya Tikhomirova	September 20, 2019 (Moolt app); October 11, 2019 (Moolt in Cinema); October 23, 2019 (YouTube)	TBA	209
36	10	"The Beauty and the Beast" "Красавица и Чудовище"	Svetlana Tugaybey	Maria Parfenova and Natalya Tikhomirova	October 25, 2019 (Moolt app); November 9, 2019 (Moolt in Cinema); November 22, 2019 (YouTube)	TBA	210
37	11	"The Keeper of Time" "Хранительница времени"	Daria Rud	Maria Parfenova and Maria Mazurova	November 22, 2019 (Moolt app); December 6, 2019 (YouTube)	TBA	211
38	12	"A watchmaker" "Часовых дел мастерица"	Alexey Ignatov	Maria Parfenova and Natalya Tikhomirova	December 13, 2019 (Moolt app); January 4, 2020 (Moolt in Cinema); January 31, 2020 (YouTube)	TBA	212
39	13	"Knight's armor" "Доспехи богатыря"	Svetlana Tugaybey, Mikhail Gavrilenko, Polina Morozova, and Vladimir Gagurin	Maria Parfenova and Natalya Tikhomirova	January 3, 2020 (Moolt app); January 18, 2020 (Moolt in Cinema); February 14, 2020 (YouTube)	TBA	213
40	14	"Goodnight, Fairy Teller!" "Баю-бай, Сказочник!"	Unknown	Maria Parfenova and Natalya Tikhomirova	January 31, 2020 (Moolt app); February 15, 2020 (Moolt in Cinema); February 28, 2020 (YouTube)	TBA	214
41	15	"Underwater racing" "Подводные гонки"	Alexey Ignatov	Maria Parfenova and Jordan Kefalidi	February 28, 2020 (Moolt app); March 14, 2020 (Moolt in Cinema); March 26, 2020 (YouTube)	TBA	215
42	16	"The Palace commotion" "Дворцовый переполох"	Anastasia Chernova, Svetlana Tugaybey, Polina Morozova, and Sofia Zorskaya	Maria Parfenova and Natalya Tikhomirova	April 10, 2020 (Moolt app); April 17, 2020 (YouTube)	TBA	216
43	17	"The Mystery of the Foggy Maze" "Тайна Туманного лабиринта"	Unknown	Maria Parfenova and Natalya Tikhomirova	May 1, 2020 (Moolt app); May 8, 2020 (YouTube)	TBA	217
44	18	"The new heroes" "Новые герои"	Alexey Ignatov	Maria Parfenova and Natalya Tikhomirova	May 29, 2020 (Moolt app); June 9, 2020 (YouTube)	TBA	218
45	19	"The heart of the watch" "Сердце часов"	Studio "Mucha"	Maria Parfenova and Jordan Kefalidi	June 26, 2020 (Moolt app); July 10, 2020 (YouTube)	TBA	219
46	20	"Long-awaited meeting" "Долгожданная встреча"	Svetlana Boldina, Mila Ryumantseva and Anton Khudyakov	Maria Parfenova and Natalya Tikhomirova	July 24, 2020 (Moolt app); August 7, 2020 (YouTube)	TBA	220
47	21	"The Mystery of the Gorgon Jellyfish" "Тайна Медузы Горгоны"	Alexey Ignatov	Maria Parfenova and Tatiana Zadorozhnaya	August 7, 2020 (Moolt app); August 28, 2020 (YouTube)	TBA	221
48	22	"An uninvited dinner" "Незванный обед"	Alexey Guylit, Svetlana Boldina and Sofia Zorskaya	Maria Parfenova and Natalya Tikhomirova	October 16, 2020 (Moolt app); October 30, 2020 (YouTube)	TBA	222
49	23	"The New Wizard" "Новый визирь"	Studio “Mucha”	Maria Parfenova and Natalya Tikhomirova	October 23, 2020 (Moolt app); November 6, 2020 (YouTube)	TBA	223
50	24	"The Knight's history" "История рыцаря"	Mila Rumyantseva, Anton Khudyakov, Sofia Zorskaya, Svetlana Tugaibei and Svetlana Boldina	Maria Parfenova and Natalya Tikhomirova	November 6, 2020 (Moolt app); November 20, 2020 (YouTube)	TBA	224
51	25	"Everything in the sicret" "Всё тайное"	Unknown	Unknown	December 4, 2020 (Moolt app); TBA (YouTube)	TBA	225
52	26	"The first ballet" "Первый бал"	TBA	TBA	TBA	TBA	226

== The Chronicles (2019–20) ==
A spin-off series to Fantasy Patrol, titled Fantasy Patrol: The Chronicles, premiered on August 2, 2019.

No.	Title	Directed by	Written by	Original release date	English release date	Prod. code
1	"Путешествие Зайки"	Daria Rud	Maria Parfenova and Natalya Tikhomirova	August 2, 2019 (Moolt app); August 17, 2019 (Moolt in Cinema); August 27, 2019 (YouTube)	TBA	101
2	"Пробуждение огня"	Polina Morozova	Maria Parfenova and Natalya Tikhomirova	August 16, 2019 (Moolt app); September 12, 2019 (YouTube)	TBA	102
3	"Путь Разноцветика"	Polina Morozova	Maria Parfenova and Natalya Tikhomirova	August 30, 2019 (Moolt app); September 25, 2019 (YouTube)	TBA	103
4	"Секрет лесной девочки"	Alexander Bespalov	Maria Parfenova and Natalya Tikhomirova	September 6, 2019 (Moolt app); September 20, 2019 (YouTube)	TBA	104
5	"Дерево Раздора"	Alexander Bespalov	Maria Parfenova and Natalya Tikhomirova	October 11, 2019 (Moolt app); October 25, 2019 (YouTube)	TBA	105
6	"Тише, мыши!"	Polina Morozova	Maria Parfenova and Natalya Tikhomirova	November 1, 2019 (Moolt app); November 15, 2019 (YouTube)	TBA	106
7	"Нерадивый ученик"	Polina Morozova	Maria Parfenova and Natalya Tikhomirova	November 16, 2019 (Moolt app); November 29, 2019 (YouTube)	TBA	107
8	"Волшебные правила"	Polina Morozova	Maria Parfenova and Natalya Tikhomirova	December 7, 2019 (Moolt app); December 20, 2019 (YouTube)	TBA	108
9	"Полярное чудо"	Rafael Ter-Sargsyan	Maria Parfenova and Natalya Tikhomirova	December 24, 2019 (Moolt app); January 10, 2020 (YouTube)	TBA	112
10	"Ветер перемен"	Olga Amol	Maria Parfenova and Natalya Tikhomirova	December 27, 2019 (Moolt app); January 7, 2020 (YouTube)	TBA	111
11	"Сокровище дружбы"	Polina Morozova	Maria Parfenova and Natalya Tikhomirova	January 10, 2020 (Moolt app); January 24, 2020 (YouTube)	TBA	109
12	"Первый Хранитель"	Polina Morozova	Maria Parfenova and Natalya Tikhomirova	February 7, 2020 (Moolt app)	TBA	113
13	"Братья-изобретатели"	Rafael Ter-Sargsyan	Maria Parfenova and Natalya Tikhomirova	February 14, 2020 (Moolt app)	TBA	110
14	"Волшебная гитара"	Alexander Bespalov	Maria Parfenova and Natalya Tikhomirova	April 3, 2020 (Moolt app)	TBA	114
TBA	"Волшебные гастроли"	TBA	TBA	TBA	TBA	115

== Film (2021) ==
An animated film based on Fantasy Patrol, "Koshchey: The True Story", was originally scheduled to release in 2020, but it was delayed to 2021 due to the COVID-19 pandemic.

Title	Directed by	Written by	Original release date
Koshchey: The True Story	Andrey Kolpin	Evgeny Golovin, Maria Parfenova, and Anton Lanshakov	October 28, 2021
A young warrior, Koshchey's mission is to destroy the White Monster who made him an outcast. His world changes once he meets a young circus actress, May. Together they embark on an adventure to save the world from an ancient evil force.
