= Andrey Batt =

Russian actor and rapper (born 1985)

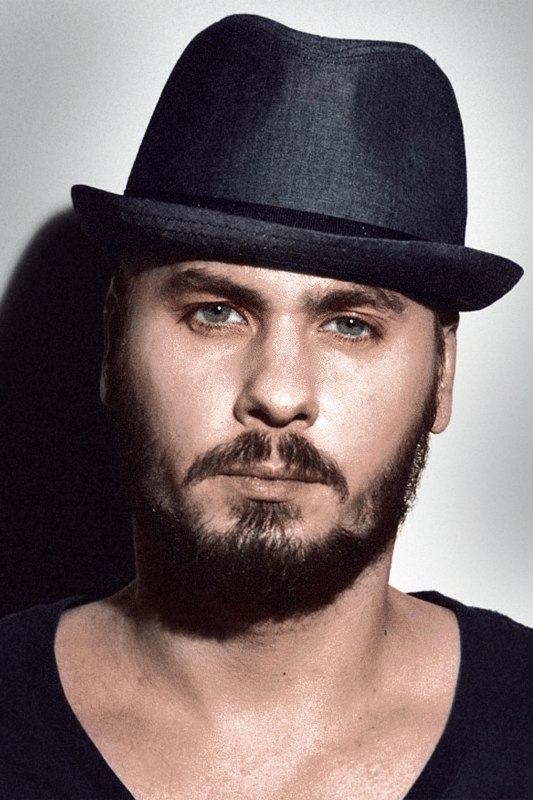
- Andrey Batt at the "Exposed – A Space for Art" Gallery grand opening in Moscow, 2014
- Born: Andrey Sergeevich Batychko
- Other name: Batt
- Occupations: Actor, director, rapper, producer, songwriter
- Years active: 2002 – present
- Website: www.andreybatt.com

Andrey Batt (born Andrey Sergeevich Batychko, Russian: Андре́й Серге́евич Ба́тычко) is a Russian actor, director, rapper, songwriter, composer and producer. Batt began his career as a director at just seventeen, with the independent sports film Remix Tape (2002). In 2009, Batt began acting, appearing in commercials and TV-shows. In 2016, he performed with a halftime show at EuroLeague.

== Acting career ==
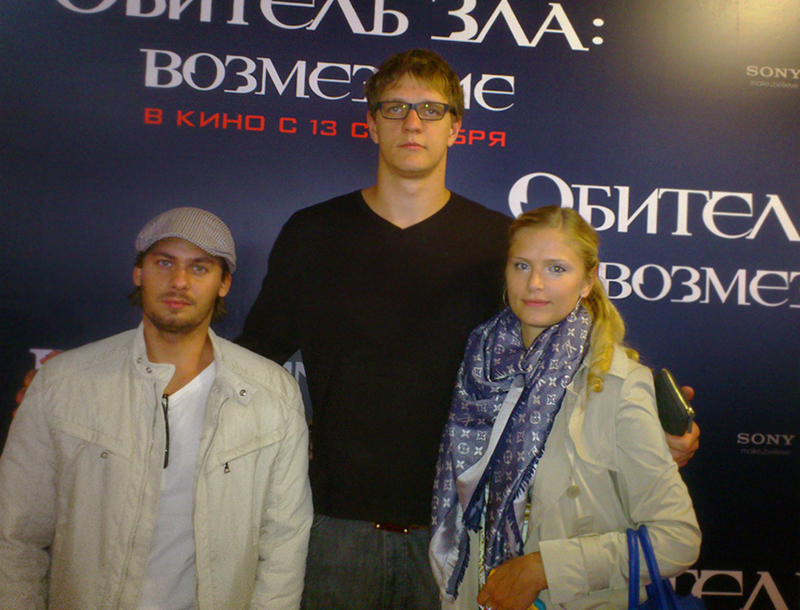
Andrey Batt and NBA player Timofey Mozgov of Los Angeles Lakers with his wife at the Resident Evil: Retribution Moscow Premiere, September 2012

Batt began performing in 2009, appearing in several commercials and television roles. His first acting appearance was in NTV Plus channel sports commercial. Later, he starred in several TV shows like Wedding Ring on Channel One and The Capital of Sin (Success by All Means), where his co-stars were Dmity Nagiev and Viktoriya Tolstoganova.

In 2010 Batt moved to Los Angeles. He appeared in several American TV shows like Justified in which he starred opposite of Timothy Olyphant and The Walking Dead.

In summer 2014 Batt announced his first Russian superhero film called Hero.

In 2023, Batt voiced Marty the caterpillar in the Canadian animated motion picture Butterfly Tale.

== Music career ==
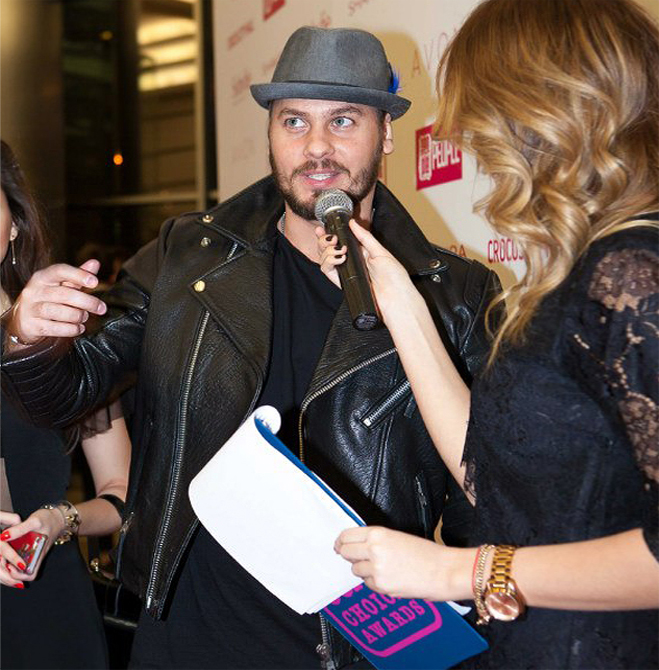
Andrey Batt at the "Oops! Choice Awards" 2014

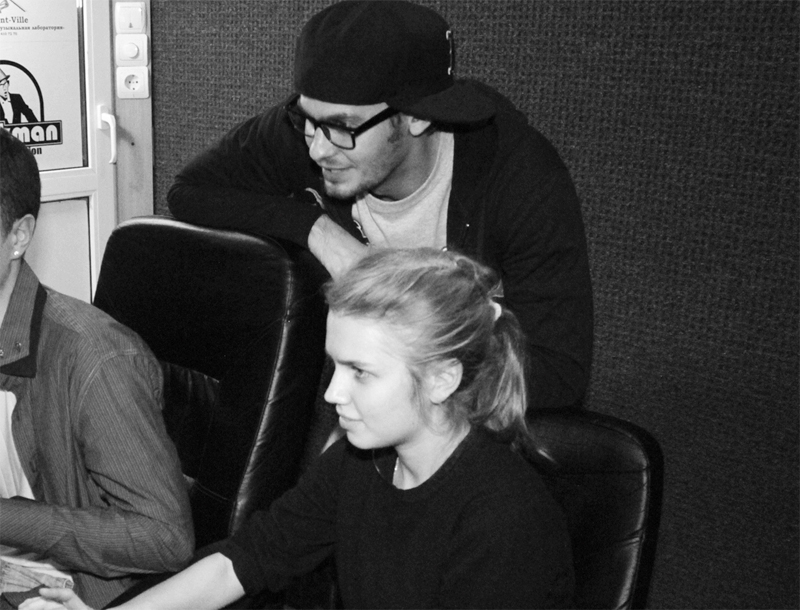
Andrey Batt & Darya Melnikova at the studio in Moscow, recording "Letniy"

Single "Love Above the Clouds" (Russian: "Любовь над облаками") was the first musical experience by Andrey Batychko as his hip-hop alter-ego Batt (Means "Bat" on Creole dialect). It was released on January 15, 2013, on iTunes.

"Love Above the Clouds" music video is features Russian celebrities and sportsmens as:

- Actress Darya Melnikova, known for her lead role in a Russian TV series "Daddy's Daughters" on CTC Channel;
- 2012 Olympic Games bronze medalist Anton Ponkrashov of the CSKA Moscow and the Russian national basketball team;
- 2009 Universiade silver medalist Anatoly Kashirov of the "Spartak" Saint Petersburg and the Russian national basketball team;

On December 16, 2013, Batt released his second single "Letniy" (Russian: "Летний") featuring vocals from Darya Melnikova. It was written and produced by Batt. A music video for the song was released on August 27, 2014. The video received positive reception from critics.

== Philanthropy ==
Andrey Batt is a founder of the Charity Box Foundation, a philanthropic organisation that strives to support kids with disabilities. The charity programmes and events are held regularly.

== Filmography ==
=== Film ===
Year	Movie	Production	Character	Notes
2023	Butterfly Tale	Canada / Germany	Marty	Voice
2016–2021	The Artist's Adventure	Russia	Self	Director / Producer / Composer
2013	Fighting Spirit	Japan / United States	Alexander	Independent film
2010–2018	The Walking Dead	United States	Rick's Friend	
2011–2014	The Killing	Canada / United States	Hijacker	
2011	Father's Day	United States		Short film
2010–2015	Justified	United States	Cop	
2010	The Capital of Sin (Success by All Means)	Ukraine / Russia	Bribes barman	
2010	Dirty Work	Russia	Victor	TV series
2010	You Ordered Murder	Russia		TV series
2009	City of Temptation	Russia / Ukraine	Kostia	
2008–2011	Wedding Ring	Russia		Television special (TeleROMAN)
2004	Remix Tape Volume 2	Russia	Self	Director / Producer
2002	Remix Tape Volume 1	Russia	Self	Director / Producer

== Discography ==
=== Singles ===
- 2013 – "Lyubov Nad Oblakami"
- 2014 – "Letniy" (featuring Dasha Melnikova)
- 2015 – "Letniy" (RIA Project Saxophone Dance Remix)
- 2017 – "Moy Gorod"

=== Music video ===
- 2014 – "Letniy" (featuring Dasha Melnikova)
