= Koschey: The Everlasting Story =

- Theatrical release poster
- Directed by: Andrey Kolpin (ru)
- Written by: Yevgeny Golovin; Maria Parfyonova; Anton Lanshakov
- Screenplay by: Yevgeny Golovin
- Based on: Fantasy Patrol
- Produced by: Robert Gndolyan; Tatyana Tsyvareva; Yevgeny Golovin; Anton Smetankin; Marianna Galstukhova-Smetankina
- Starring: Nikita Volkov; Irina Starshenbaum; Timur Rodriguez; Arseny Perel
- Narrated by: Anfisa Vistinghausen
- Cinematography: Ivan Gudkov
- Edited by: Olga Grinshpun; Leonid Feldman; Yana Martynenko
- Music by: Sergey Bogolyubsky; Daria Stavrovich
- Animation by: Tatiana Petrovska; Andrey Osadchikh; Andrey Romashikhin
- Production companies: Parovoz Animation Studio; Digital Russia; Russia-1; Cinema Fund
- Distributed by: KaroProkat (English: KaroRental)
- Release date: 28 October 2021 (Russia)
- Running time: 100 minutes
- Country: Russia
- Language: Russian
- Budget: ₽200 million
- Box office: ₽136.1 million

Koschey: The Everlasting Story (Russian: Кощей. Начало, romanized: Koschey. Nachalo, lit. 'Koschey: The Beginning') is a full-length animated Russian sword and sorcery film directed by Andrey Kolpin, and stars the voice of Nikita Volkov, Irina Starshenbaum, Timur Rodriguez, and Arseny Perel. It is part of the universe of the popular cartoon franchise Fantasy Patrol.

The film was theatrically released in Russia on October 28, 2021 by KaroProkat (KaroRental in English).

== Plot ==
In ancient times, humans and mythical creatures lived together in the Divnozemskoye principality. Their world is threatened by the White Ghost, a creature capable of widespread destruction. Koschey, a young man who rides a motorcycle, becomes responsible for confronting the threat.

== Cast ==
- Nikita Volkov as Koschey the Immortal (Koschei)
- Irina Starshenbaum as May
- Timur Rodriguez as Sword Kladenets (Swordy)
- Arseny Perel as Bao
- Yuri Galtsev as Vodyanoy
- Pavel Barshak as Prince Beloyar
- Vladislav Vetrov as Likho
- Irina Medvedeva as Yadviga Petrovna (Baba Yaga)
- Yulia Zimina as Vasilisa Vasilievna
- Miroslava Karpovich as Helena
- Olga Kuzmina as Valery
- Yuliya Aleksandrova as Mary
- Polina Kutepova as Snowy
- Andrey Rozhkov as Basilio the Cat
- Daniil Eldarov as Guards
- Anfisa Vistinghausen as narrator

== Production ==
In August 2017, on the air of the Radio Mayak radio station, the general director of the Parovoz Animation Studio (ru) by Anton Smetankin said that the studio had begun to create a full-length version, which is originally scheduled to release in 2020, but it was delayed to 2021 due to the COVID-19 pandemic.
