= Alisa Knows What to Do! =

Russian animated television series

- Russian: Алиса знает, что делать!
- Genre: Sci-fi; Comedy
- Created by: Olga Baulina; Viktor Glukhushin
- Country of origin: Russia
- Original language: Russian
- No. of seasons: 1
- No. of episodes: 24

Production
- Producers: Timur Bekmambetov; Elena Malyonkina
- Running time: 26 minutes
- Production company: Bazelevs

Original release
- Network: STS; Carousel
- Release: 16 November 2013 – 5 March 2016

Alisa Knows What to Do! (Russian: Алиса знает, что делать!, romanized: Alisa znaet, shto delat!) is a Russian animated series, based on the books of Kir Bulychev about Alisa Selezneva. The premiere took place on 16 November 2013 on STS a day before the official birthday of Alisa, and three months later on February 3, 2014 on the Carousel TV channel. This is the first screen version of Alisa Selezneva in which many episodes of the series are original stories and not based directly on the books by Bulychev, and the first screen version made using computer animation.

== Cast ==
=== English dubbing ===
- Laurie Hymes as Alisa Salazar
- Mike Pollock as Mr. Peterson, Poly-R, Zdob, Spaceship Voice
- Marc Thompson as Eric Schroedinger, Dictator Dziki, Giant, Additional Voices
- Kate Bristol as Marie White
- Billy Bob Thompson as Alex Taylor, Curator Selgeh, Brr, Prince Taqlee, Arnold, Bol, Spaceport Voice, Security Guard
- Alyson Rosenfeld as Natalie White, Alex's Mom
- Jason Griffith as Professor Salazar, Gulby, Head Robot (307), Additional Voices
- Graham Halstead as Truenox Duper
- Michael Frazer as Dr. Gilliam
- William Tost as Erik's Grandfather
- Johnathan Brimmer as Protofelix
- Wayne Grayson as Victimok, Sheriff, Trunox Duper (Test dub)
- Tyler Bunch as General Draxpod, Showman
- Tom Wayland as Itrod, Eeek, Dibalan Pilot, Phillip Soleko, Hikle, Scupulous, Raven, Barphbuds, Security Selgeh, Humorometr, Additional Voices
- David Wills as Magusis, Dulby, Holmov, Ridic
- Charles D. Cherrier as Alisa Chantal
- Ryan Nicolls as Jan
- Eileen Stevens as Mrs. Salazar, Gulby (Young), Infomercial Operator, Additional Voices
- Melissa Hope as Flos, Denise, Angelina, Newscaster
- Allen Enlow as August
- Alysha Deslorieux as Madame Manna
- Bill Timoney as Appert
- Emily Bauer as Minister
- Erica Schroeder as Queen Tira
- Jake Paque as Talgut
- Jason O'Connell as Little Giant
- Samara Nayemi as Salda
- Scottie Ray as Anur
- Vanessa Gardner as Produces
- Johnathan Brimmer as additional voices

=== Russian voice cast ===
- Darya Melnikova
- Armen Dzhigarkhanyan
- Miroslava Karpovich
- Anna Ardova
- Dmitry Nazarov
- Alexey Kolgan
- Irina Grishina
- Viktor Andrienko
- Valery Storozhik
- Prokhor Chekhovskoy
- Olga Syrina
- Eugene Donskikh
- Alexander Pozharov
- Igor Harlamov
- Alexander Lobanov

==== Guest stars ====
- Igor Taradaikin
- Yekaterina Sculkina
- Dmitri Yermak
- Natalia Bistrova
- Pyotr Glanz
- Anna Galler
- Artur Smolyaninov
- Anna Guchenkova
- Gosha Kutsenko
- Anton Bogdanov
- Andrei Birin
- Alexandra Uruslyak
- Garik Kharlamov

== Episodes ==
No.	Title	Original release date
1	"The Mystery of the Last Truenox"	16 November 2013
2	"Dangerous Illusions"	23 November 2013
3	"Captains"	30 November 2013
4	"A Balance"	7 December 2013
5	"Brains Away!"	14 December 2013
6	"Oracle in Retirement"	21 December 2013
7	"Games Without Rules"	28 December 2013
8	"Singing Showdown"	6 April 2014 12 April 2014
9	"Explosive Kids"	19 April 2014 26 April 2014
10	"Golden Zooms"	3 May 2014
11	"Hostages of Dibala"	20 September 2014 27 September 2014
12	"Perfection"	1 November 2014
13	"Sunday Cloning"	23 December 2014
14	"Skin Deep"	28 February 2015
15	"Energy of the Past"	14 March 2013
16	"Outdated Models"	21 March 2015
17	"Wipe Out Creativity"	17 May 2015
18	"Humanitatian Aid"	24 May 2015
19	"Rastronceros Swap"	31 May 2015
20	"Old Villains"	7 June 2013
21	"Green Revenge"	15 October 2015 17 October 2015
22	"Flattery Will Get You Nowhere"	24 October 2015 31 October 2015
23	"The Science of Humor"	12 December 2016 19 December 2016
24	"Don't Even Think About It!"	11 January 2016 16 January 2016

=== Alisa Club ===
Additionally a separate series of humorous episodes were released in 2017 under the title of "Alisa Club".

Episode	Title	Summary
1	Superman	Natalie White teaches her sister Marie some feminine secrets – how to attract boys. But Marie takes her sister's advice too literally, which leads to a funny situation.
2	Love Is Blind (Also known as Love Is Evil)	To get more attention and care, the Super Truenox Duper decided to reprogram the house robot Poly-R, but Poly-R isn't averse to playing pranks on his friend either.
3	A Date	Alex tries getting over his fear of asking out Alisa to a date using an AI robot Erik created, but chaos ensues when they have to hide the robot from real Alisa.

== Film ==
A film continuation of Alisa Knows What to Do! produced by Bazelevs, titled My Super Dad (Russian: Мой супер папа, romanized: Moy super papa), was slated to be released some time in spring of 2017, but was eventually pushed back to March 30th, 2018. Voice cast of the film includes Darya Melnikova, Timur Rodriguez, Konstantin Khabensky and Vasilisa Savkina. The film was never released and eventually cancelled, possibly due to insufficient funds. It is considered partial lost media.
