= Fantasy Patrol =

Russian television series

- Russian: Сказочный патруль
- Genre: Adventure; Comedy; Fantasy; Magical girl
- Created by: Vadim Volya; Evgeniy Golovin
- Written by: Maria Parfenova; Evgeny Golovin; Anton Lanshakov; Julia Ivanova; Jordan Kefalidi; Natalya Tikhomirova
- Directed by: Nail Mubinov; Anastasia Chernova; Tatyana Bolotnova; Marina Nefyodova; Svetlana Tugabay; Expand: Alexey Lukyanchikov; Alexey Sudakov; Alexey Ignatov; Ekaterina Rodina; Mikhail Milotovsky; Elena Phillipik; Daria Rud; Polina Morozova; Vladimir Gagurin
- Voices of: Miroslava Karpovich; Anfisa Wistingausen; Olga Kuzmina; Yuliya Aleksandrova; Polina Kutepova
- Opening theme: "Fantasy Patrol Theme" (season 1) "Тайнами наполнен мир" (season 2) by Dariya Stavrovich
- Composers: Sergey Bogolubskiy; Dariya Stavrovich
- Country of origin: Russia
- Original language: Russian
- No. of seasons: 5
- No. of episodes: 130 (list of episodes)

Production
- Producers: Dmitriy Mednikov; Tatiyana Tsyvareva; Evgeniy Golovin; Anton Smetankin; Alexander Sablukov; Natalia Belyanina
- Editor: Maksim Maksimov
- Running time: 11 minutes
- Production company: Studio Parovoz

Original release
- Network: Moolt; Moolt in Cinema; YouTube
- Release: April 30, 2016 – present

Related
- Fantasy Patrol: The Chronicles

Fantasy Patrol (Russian: Сказочный патруль, romanized: Skazochnyy patrul) is a Russian animated fantasy television series created by Vadim Volya and Evgeniy Golovin. The series follows the adventures of four young sorceress girls who live in the city of Myshkin. The series is produced by Studio Parovoz. It premiered on the multi-series newsreel, Moolt in Cinema on April 30, 2016, and was later released to YouTube on May 19, 2016.

A spin-off series, Fantasy Patrol: The Chronicles premiered on August 2, 2019. An animated film based on the series, Koschey: The Everlasting Story, was released in 2021.

== Plot ==
The series takes place in the mysterious city of Myshkin (Fableton in the English version), which is filled with many fairytale heroes and unusual adventures and miracles. The ordinary residents of the city are unsuspecting of the true nature of the city. Three young girls who also appear to be ordinary but are actually young sorceresses; Varya, Masha, and Snowy, move to Myshkin where they meet Helena, a local city girl. They soon become best friends with each other, forming a superhero team called the Fantasy Patrol. Their task is to observe the behavior of any fairytale characters that inhabit the city and help them, while protecting the calm side of the city from any harm, maintaining a balance between both worlds.

== Cast ==
=== Main ===
- Miroslava Karpovich, Anfisa Wistingausen as Helena
- Olga Kuzmina as Varya
- Yuliya Aleksandrova as Mary
- Polina Kutepova as Snowy

=== Recurring ===
- Glafira Tarkhanova as Alice
- Alex Louis

== Episodes ==
Season	Episodes	Originally released	
Season	Episodes	First released	Last released
1	26	April 30, 2016	December 14, 2018
2	26	February 16, 2019	February 5, 2021
Chronicles	78	August 2, 2019	TBA
3	26	February 12, 2021	TBA
Film		2021	

== Broadcast ==
Fantasy Patrol has been broadcast in Russia on Moolt and Ani since May 2016, on Carousel by the end of 2016, and later on Super in 2018. In South Africa, the series premiered on eToonz on March 25, 2019. The first season is available in English on iTunes. In Pakistan, Fantasy Patrol was released in the Urdu language in Kids Zone. A total of 17 episodes of the show in English have been uploaded so far onto the Moolt Kids YouTube channel.

== Songs ==
The music for the series was written by Russian band, Slot.

Title	Performer(s)	Episode
Fantasy Patrol Theme	—N/a	All season 1 episodes
"Приветствие Алёнки"	Miroslava Karpovich	"The Beginning"
"Сражение с Тоской Зелёной"	Miroslava Karpovich	"The Beginning"
"Город Мышкин"	—N/a	"The Beginning" "Everything Is Under Control"
"Персонажи сказки"	Karpovich; Polina Kutepova; Olga Kuzmina; Yuliya Aleksandrova	"How to Become a Star"
"В старинной сказке говорится"	Kuzmina; Aleksandrova; Dariya Stavrovich	"The Big Day"
"Песня Алёнки и её клонов"	Karpovich	"The Prophecy"
"Бывает жизнь порой"	Kutepova; Aleksandrova; Kuzmina	"Dancing Queen"
"Бывает жизнь порой"	—N/a	"A Fiery Guest"
"Как узнать свою подругу"	—N/a	"Snow Queen"
"Тайнами наполнен мир"	Stavrovich	All season 2 episodes
"Колыбельная для дракона"	—N/a	"Страна саламандр"
"Волшебный мир, встречай!"	—N/a	"Волшебный мир, встречай!"

== Accolades ==
Year	Award	Category	Nominee(s)	Result	Ref.
2017	Icarus	Startup	Fantasy Patrol (for "Everybody Dance Now!")	Won	
2017	Cyber Sousa	Best Foreign Animated Series	Fantasy Patrol	Won	
2018	Mooltimir	Best Russian Animated Series	Fantasy Patrol	Won	
2018	Mooltimir	Best Song of Russian Animated Series	Fantasy Patrol (for "Поверь в себя")	Won	
2018	Mooltimir	Best Licensed Product for Russian Animated Series	Fantasy Patrol dolls (0+ Media)	Won	
2018	Mooltimir	Best Heroine of Russian Animated Series	Snowy	Won	
2019	Taffy-Kids 2019	Best Animated Series	Fantasy Patrol	Won	

== Merchandise ==
=== Books ===
Russian writer and screenwriter, Oleg Roy set to work on a series of books based on Fantasy Patrol. In total, 12 books are planned to be published for the series. So far, 6 books have been released.

=== Games ===
Four apps were released for the series; "Fantasy Patrol", "Fantasy Patrol: Adventures", "Music Patrol", and "Fantasy Patrol: Cafe". All of these games were released on Android and iOS platforms.

=== Magazines ===
In November 2018, Fantasy Patrol magazines were released. Posters, stickers, and stories from Oleg Roy also come with the magazines.

== Spin-off ==
A spin-off series of Fantasy Patrol was previewed on the main stage of Mooltimir on June 1, 2019 titled "Fantasy Patrol: The Chronicles". The series premiered on Moolt on August 2, 2019, and the first episode was then released to YouTube on August 27.

== Film ==
In August 2017, the director of Parovoz, Anton Smetankin, announced the production of an animated film, Koschey: The Everlasting Story, based on the Fantasy Patrol series, which is originally scheduled to release in 2020, but it was delayed to 2021 due to the COVID-19 pandemic. The script was written by Evgeny Golovin and Maria Parfenova. The film is about the story of young Koschey and how he tries to find his way in a new world.
