= Galina Danilova =

Russian actress

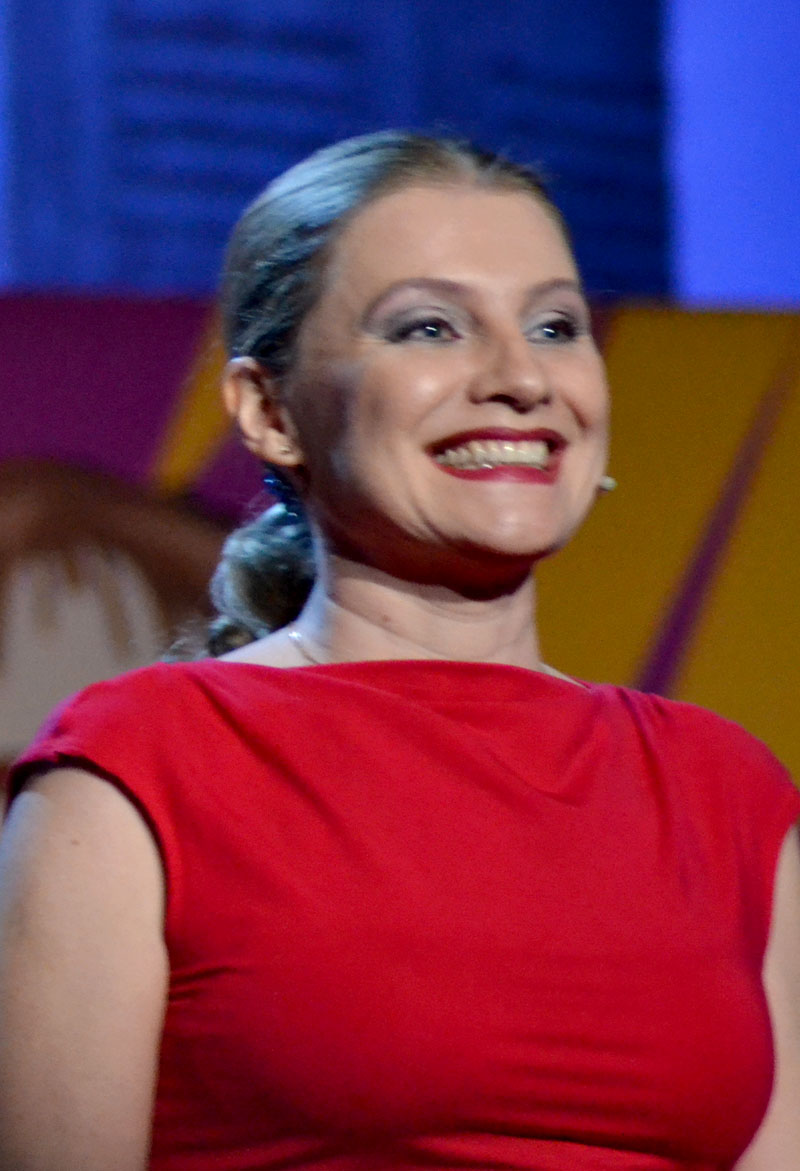
- Born: Galina Eduardovna Danilova; 2 May 1968 (age 57); Yoshkar-Ola, Mari El, Russian SFSR, Soviet Union
- Occupation: Actress
- Years active: 1989–present
- Spouse(s): Vladimir Popov (divorced; 1 child); Dmitry Koltakov (m.2001–2009, divorced; 1 child); Seykhun Ezber (m.2011–present)
- Children: 2

Galina Eduardovna Danilova (Russian: Гали́на Эдуа́рдовна Дани́лова; born 2 May 1968) is a Russian actress.

== Biography ==
Galina Danilova was born in Yoshkar-Ola and raised in the village of Yudino (Kazan), Russia. During school years she always played major roles in school theatrical productions. After graduation she was admitted to Kazan Theatre School. She moved to Moscow in 1989 where she worked in Satyricon theater. Her work includes: "Threepenny Opera", "Jacques and his master", "Extremaduran killer" and "The Thief of Bagdad" among others.

In 2006-2015, he was one of the main actors of the sketch show 6 kadrov.

== Personal life ==
Galina married for the fourth time on July 13, 2011. Her husband is Seyhun Ezber.

She has two children, a son Nikita Popov (b. 1989) from her first marriage to Vladimir Popov, and a daughter Ulyana Koltakova (b. 2001, also like her mother is a character actress) from her third marriage to Dmitry Koltakov.

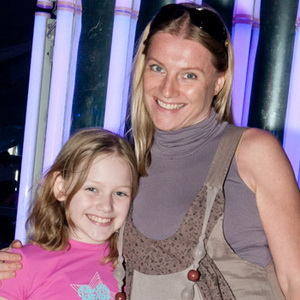
Galina Danilova with her daughter at the yacht club "Admiral" 2012.

== Selected filmography ==
- 2005 Oh, frost, frost! - Mama
- 2006-2007 Kadetstvo (TV Series) - mother cadets Andrey Levakov
- 2006 Worm - mother Sergei
- 2006-2008 Happy Together (TV Series) - Zinaida
- 2006-2008 Who's the Boss? (TV Series) - episodes
- 2008 Where are the children? (TV) - fellow traveler with baby
- 2008 Provincial (TV Series) - Mariya Ladova
- 2008 New Rate - harmful aunt in the bus
- 2008-2013 Daddy's Daughters (TV Series) - Galina Sergeevna, mother Polezhaykina
- 2008 Step by step (TV Series) - Katya, wife of Viti
- 2008 Protection against - Valentina Fyodorovna
- 2010 Basic version - Pribylovskiy
- 2010 Yolki - girlfriend Yulia
- 2011 Moscow - not Moscow - Nina, wife of Zotov
- 2011 Maiden hunting (TV Series) - Jeanne Molchanova
- 2013 Love does not love (TV series) - Ludmila, mother Lёli
