= Arzamasova =

Arzamasova is a surname. Notable people with the surname include:

- Liza Arzamasova (born 1995), Russian actress
- Maryna Arzamasova (born 1987), Belarusian middle-distance runner
