= Cherv =

Cherv could refer to:

- Cherv, or Worm (2006 film), a Russian film from 2006
- The acrophonic name of the letter Che (Cyrillic) in old Cyrillic alphabets
