= 6 kadrov =

Russian sketch show

- Created by: Vyacheslav Murugov; Alexander Rodnyansky
- Starring: Fyodor Dobronravov; Eduard Radzyukevich; Galina Danilova; Irina Medvedeva; Andrey Kaikov; Sergey Dorogov
- Country of origin: Russia
- No. of episodes: 321

Production
- Running time: 24 mins

Original release
- Network: STS
- Release: 2006 – 2015

6 kadrov (Russian: 6 кадров, literally "6 frames") is a Russian sketch show, created by Costafilm and Yellow, Black and White. It was written by former KVN players and producers Alexey Trotsyuk, Vitaly Shlyappo, Vyacheslav Dusmukhametov, Oleg Mastich, and others.

== Content ==
The program is a classic sketch show without regular characters. Most of the sketches play out situations from everyday life. There is a satire on some social and domestic vices.

Some sketches show parodies of famous historical figures and fictional characters. In particular:

- Parodies of rulers — Ivan the Terrible, Peter the Great, Catherine the Great, Vladimir Lenin, Joseph Stalin, Leonid Brezhnev, Adolf Hitler,
- Parody of the commander — Mikhail Kutuzov,
- Parodies of scientists — Dmitri Mendeleev, Aleksandr Popov,
- Parodies of poets and writers — Alexander Pushkin, Nikolai Gogol, Leo Tolstoy,
- Parodies of fictional characters — Alyosha Popovich, Dobrynya Nikitich, Ilya Muromets, Stierlitz.

244-253 episodes are dedicated to the XXII Winter Olympic Games 2014 in Sochi.

== Actors ==
- Fyodor Dobronravov
- Eduard Radzyukevich
- Galina Danilova
- Irina Medvedeva
- Andrey Kaikov
- Sergey Dorogov
- Sometimes Alexander Zhigalkin performs roles. He's the director of this sketch show.

== Seasons ==
	Season count
Season 1	2006
Season 2	2007
Season 3	2008
Season 4	2009
Season 5	2010
Season 6	2011
Season 7	2012–2013
Season 8	2014–2015

== Awards ==
- Golden Rhinoceros Award 2011 — in the nomination "Best Sketch"
- TEFI 2011 — in the nomination "Director of a television program" (received by Alexander Zhigalkin)
