= Fantasy Patrol: The Chronicles =

Russian animated television series

- Also known as: Fantasy Patrol: Chronicles of Miracles
- Russian: Сказочный патруль. Хроники чудес
- Genre: Adventure; Comedy; Fantasy
- Created by: Evgeniy Golovin; Dmitry Mednikov
- Based on: Fantasy Patrol by Vadim Volya and Evgeniy Golovin
- Written by: Maria Parfenova; Natalya Tikhomirova
- Directed by: Daria Rud; Polina Morozova; Alexander Bespalov; Rafael Ter-Sargsyan; Olga Amol
- Voices of: Miroslava Karpovich; Anfisa Wistingausen; Polina Kutepova; Olga Kuzmina; Yulia Alexandrova
- Opening theme: "The Chronicles Theme"
- Composers: Sergey Bogolubskiy; Dariya Stavrovich; Alexander Billion
- Country of origin: Russia
- Original language: Russian
- No. of seasons: 3
- No. of episodes: 78

Production
- Executive producer: Natalya Kozlova
- Producers: Tatiyana Tsyvareva; Evgeniy Golovin; Anton Smetankin; Alexander Sablukov
- Editor: Alyona Studennikova
- Running time: 7 minutes
- Production company: Studio Parovoz

Original release
- Network: Moolt; YouTube
- Release: August 2, 2019 – present

Related
- Fantasy Patrol

Fantasy Patrol: The Chronicles (Russian: Сказочный патруль. Хроники чудес, romanized: Skazochnyy patrul. Khroniki chudes) is a Russian animated television series, and is a spin-off of the 2016 TV series Fantasy Patrol. The series was created by Evgeniy Golovin and Dmitry Mednikov, and just like the original series, it is produced by Studio Parovoz. The first episode was previewed on the main stage of Mooltimir on June 1, 2019, and the series later premiered on Moolt on August 2, 2019. The first episode was then released to YouTube on August 27.

== Plot ==
Each episode of Fantasy Patrol: The Chronicles goes into depth about the main characters of Fantasy Patrol; Helena, Valery, Mary, and Snowy, as well as many others. The stories told are in the style of motion comics, and are meant to explain the motives of their actions.

== Cast ==
- Miroslava Karpovich (first season), Anfisa Wistingausen (second season) as Helena
- Polina Kutepova as Snowy
- Olga Kuzmina as Valery
- Yuliya Aleksandrova as Mary

== Episodes ==
No.	Title	Directed by	Written by	Original release date	English release date	Prod. code
1	"Путешествие Зайки"	Daria Rud	Maria Parfenova and Natalya Tikhomirova	August 2, 2019 (Moolt app); August 17, 2019 (Moolt in Cinema); August 27, 2019 (YouTube)	TBA	101
2	"Пробуждение огня"	Polina Morozova	Maria Parfenova and Natalya Tikhomirova	August 16, 2019 (Moolt app); September 12, 2019 (YouTube)	TBA	102
3	"Путь Разноцветика"	Polina Morozova	Maria Parfenova and Natalya Tikhomirova	August 30, 2019 (Moolt app); September 25, 2019 (YouTube)	TBA	103
4	"Секрет лесной девочки"	Alexander Bespalov	Maria Parfenova and Natalya Tikhomirova	September 6, 2019 (Moolt app); September 20, 2019 (YouTube)	TBA	104
5	"Дерево Раздора"	Alexander Bespalov	Maria Parfenova and Natalya Tikhomirova	October 11, 2019 (Moolt app); October 25, 2019 (YouTube)	TBA	105
6	"Тише, мыши!"	Polina Morozova	Maria Parfenova and Natalya Tikhomirova	November 1, 2019 (Moolt app); November 15, 2019 (YouTube)	TBA	106
7	"Нерадивый ученик"	Polina Morozova	Maria Parfenova and Natalya Tikhomirova	November 16, 2019 (Moolt app); November 29, 2019 (YouTube)	TBA	107
8	"Волшебные правила"	Polina Morozova	Maria Parfenova and Natalya Tikhomirova	December 7, 2019 (Moolt app); December 20, 2019 (YouTube)	TBA	108
9	"Полярное чудо"	Rafael Ter-Sargsyan	Maria Parfenova and Natalya Tikhomirova	December 24, 2019 (Moolt app); January 10, 2020 (YouTube)	TBA	112
10	"Ветер перемен"	Olga Amol	Maria Parfenova and Natalya Tikhomirova	December 27, 2019 (Moolt app); January 7, 2020 (YouTube)	TBA	111
11	"Сокровище дружбы"	Polina Morozova	Maria Parfenova and Natalya Tikhomirova	January 10, 2020 (Moolt app); January 24, 2020 (YouTube)	TBA	109
12	"Первый Хранитель"	Polina Morozova	Maria Parfenova and Natalya Tikhomirova	February 7, 2020 (Moolt app)	TBA	113
13	"Братья-изобретатели"	Rafael Ter-Sargsyan	Maria Parfenova and Natalya Tikhomirova	February 14, 2020 (Moolt app)	TBA	110
14	"Волшебная гитара"	Alexander Bespalov	Maria Parfenova and Natalya Tikhomirova	April 3, 2020 (Moolt app)	TBA	114
TBA	"Волшебные гастроли"	TBA	TBA	TBA	TBA	115
