= Irina Medvedeva (actress) =

Russian and Belarusian actress (born 1982)

- Ирина Медведева
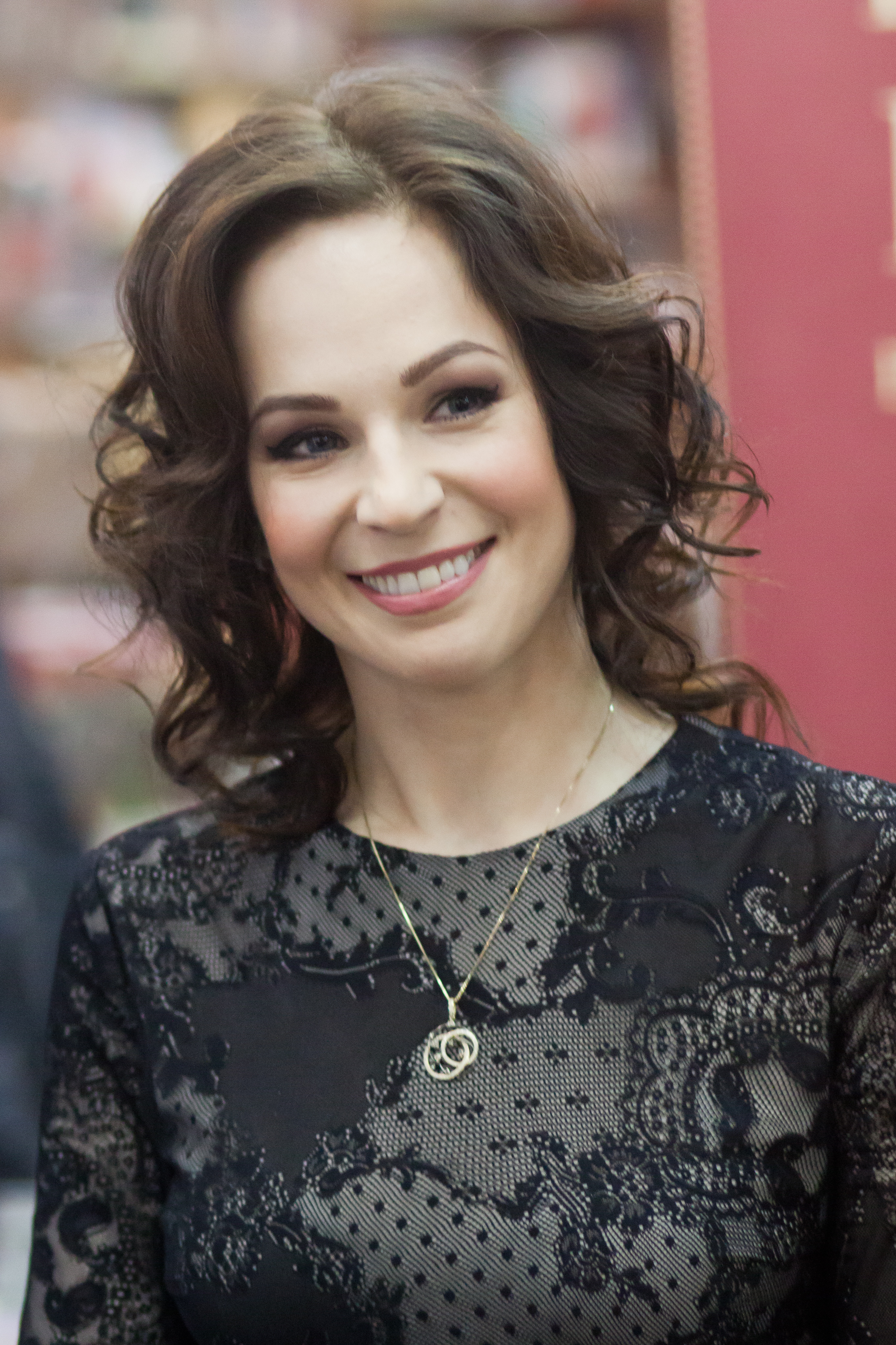
- Born: Irina Aleksandrovna Medvedeva; 14 August 1982 (age 44); Babruysk, Mogilev Region, BSSR, USSR (now Belarus)
- Citizenship: Belarus; Russia; France
- Occupations: Actress; singer
- Years active: 1999–present
- Spouse: Ruslan Alekhno (m. 2009–2011)
- Website: iramedvedeva.ru

Irina Aleksandrovna Medvedeva (Russian: Ирина Александровна Медведева, Belarusian: Ірына Аляксандраўна Мядзведзева; born 14 August 1982) is a Russian and Belarusian actress and singer. She has been a part of the cast for the Russian sketch shows Dear broadcast, 6 kadrov and Sled. Medvedeva was married to Ruslan Alekhno from 2009 until 2011.

== Biography ==
Irina Medvedeva was born in Babruysk, Mogilev Region, Byelorussian SSR, Soviet Union.

She made her silver screen debut in 1999 as a cameo role as Komsomol in the ORT TV series "Express Help". In 2003 and 2004, she worked as an actress in the Theatre of Belarusian Army.

In April 2004, Medvedeva won the REN TV reality series Faculty of Humor. In 2005, she became part of the cast in the sketch show Dear Broadcast (REN TV). From 2006, until the closure of the program in early 2014, she starred in the sketch show 6 Frames on STS (TV channel).

From 8 September to 15 December 2013, she was in tandem with figure skater Povilas Vanagas, who was a participant of the First Channel television show Ice Age 4.

From September 2014, Medvedeva led the talk show "On The Most Important Thing" with Sergei Agapkin.

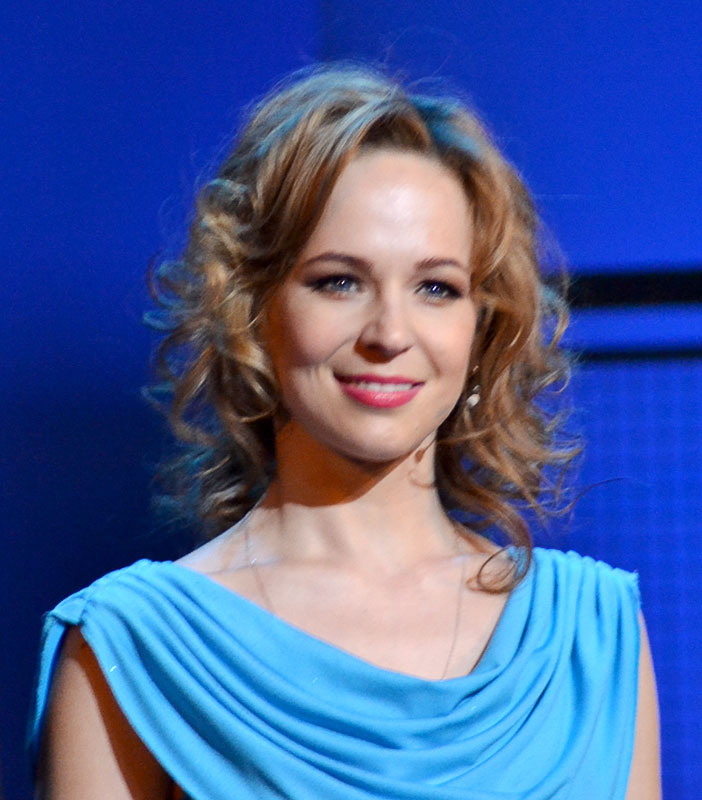
Irina Medvedeva in 2011

== Personal life ==
On July 18, 2009, Medvedeva married singer and participant of the talent competition series People's Artist, Ruslan Alekhno. In 2011, the couple officially divorced.

On July 20, 2018, she married French businessman Guillaume Bouché.

== Filmography ==
Year	Title	Role	Notes
1999	Express Help	Komsomol	TV series
2001	Express Help - 2	Komsomol	TV series
2003	Command	Olya the saleswoman	TV series
2003	The Hero Of Our Tribe	Olga	TV
2004	Men Do Not Cry	Lena the waitress	TV series
2005	Return Thirtieth	Oksana	TV
2006	Infidelity	laboratory	
2007	The Agony of Fear	Alisa	TV series
2007	Kadetstvo 2	Sveta	TV series
2008	And yet I love...	secretary of the court	TV series
2008	New Year Tariff	a girl dressed as a 'Gypsy'	
2009	Unsatisfactory for love	Sveta	
2010	Capercaillie, New Again!	Sveta	TV
2011	A Guy from Mars	Masha Zaitseva	
2011	Sled (TV series)	Dasha	TV series
2011	Swallow's Nest	Polina Orlova	TV series
2012	Most rzhaka!	Nadia	
2012	Jungle	Ira	
2012	New Year Marriage	Mariya	TV
2012	I'll Give Kittens In Good Hands	Ira	TV
2012	Bugs Love	Zina	TV
2012	Luck Rental	Kristina	TV
2014	Husband and Happy Woman	Irina	TV
2015	Little People		
2017	Miracle Yudo	voice	
2021	Koschey: The Everlasting Story	Yadviga Petrovna / Baba Yaga (voice)	
2021	The Pilot: A Battle for Survival	Nadezhda	

== Theatre ==
Year	Title	Role	Notes
2012 - 2017	RITA EDUCATION	Rita	Theatre
2013 - 2017	MY BEAUTIFUL CAT	Angela	Music-hall
2013 - 2018	POLA NEGRI	Pola Negri	3D Music-hall
2013 - 2018	37 POSTCARDS	Jelian	Theatre
2018	UNKNOWN WOMAN	Main role	Theatre
2018	MAYAKOFSKI	Main role	Theatre
