= David Brimmer =

American voice actor

David Brimmer is an American voice actor and fight choreographer. He also goes by the names David J. Brimmer and J. David Brimmer. As a voice actor, he has worked for 4Kids Entertainment, Central Park Media, DuArt Film and Video, Headline Studios, NYAV Post, and TAJ Productions.

Brimmer has been choreographing violence in New York City, as well as in regional theaters around the country for over 20 years: from the current national tour of Jekyll & Hyde and the Off-Broadway productions of Bug and Killer Joe to the Joseph Papp Public Theater's Blood Wedding. His choreography has been nominated for a Douglas Fairbanks Award for Excellence in Theater and his work is currently on file at the Lincoln Center for the Performing Arts. Recently he choreographed the violence in the musical Spring Awakening on Broadway

He is the creator and current instructor of the stage combat program at New York University's (NYU) Tisch School of the Arts, and has taught at The Meisner Extension, the Classical Studio, the Stella Adler Conservatory, the Lee Strasberg Institute, the Playwrights Horizons Theater School, Atlantic Theater Company, and the Yale School of Drama. He is a former president of the New York Fight Ensemble (NYFE) and a member of the Society of American Fight Directors, holding the title of "Fight Master."

Brimmer's approach to fight choreography focuses on the reality of pain; an often-overlooked element to stage and Hollywood fights. In his classes, students are asked to live through the situation of hurting or getting hurt. Warm up exercises include "Mike Ball", "Assassins", and "The Poison-Arm Samurai".

== Anime dubbing ==
- Berserk – Nosferatu Zodd
- Pokémon – Crasher Wake, Mannes, Wulfric, Dr. Proctor, Victor, Simon
- The Third – Narrator
- Mobile Suit Gundam Unicorn - Suberoa Zinnerman
- Shaman King — Mosuke, Bason; "Big Guy" Bill Burton, Tona Papik Cadimahide (2001) (4kids Version)
- Ultimate Muscle: The Kinnikuman Legacy - Sunshine
- Lu over the Wall - Lu's Father
- Lupin III: The First - Lambert
- Fighting Foodons - King Gorgeous Gorge/Don Cook
- One Piece - Crocodile, Axe-Hand Morgan, Lucky Roux, Barbarossa (4kids Version)
- Jungle Emperor Leo - Pagoola

== Animation roles ==
- Alisa Knows What to Do!
- Chomp Squad - Blaze
- Viva Piñata - Professor Pester
- Cubix: Robots for Everyone - Chipinator
- Chaotic - Vidav
- G.I. Joe: Sigma 6 - Machete, Torch
- Teenage Mutant Ninja Turtles - Dr. Malignus, Warrior King, Big Boss, Zanramon, Rynokk, Aramzedo, Hooded Man
- Impy's Wonderland - Solomon
- Impy's Island - Solomon
