= Uma2rman =

Russian pop rock band

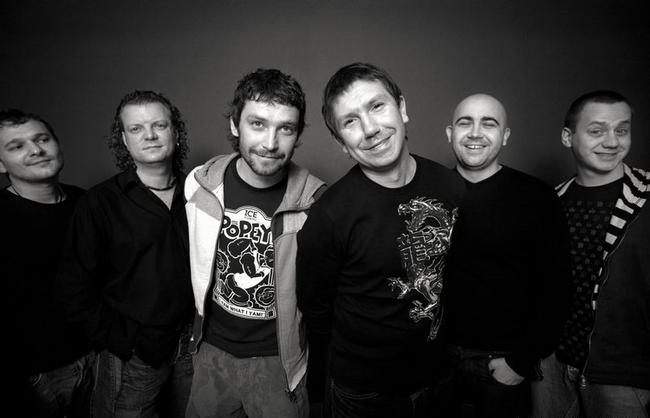
- Uma2rman, 2008

Background information
- Origin: Nizhny Novgorod, Russia
- Genres: Pop rock, alternative rock
- Years active: 2003–present
- Labels: MONOLIT; Velvet
- Members: Sergei Kristovsky; Vladimir Kristovsky

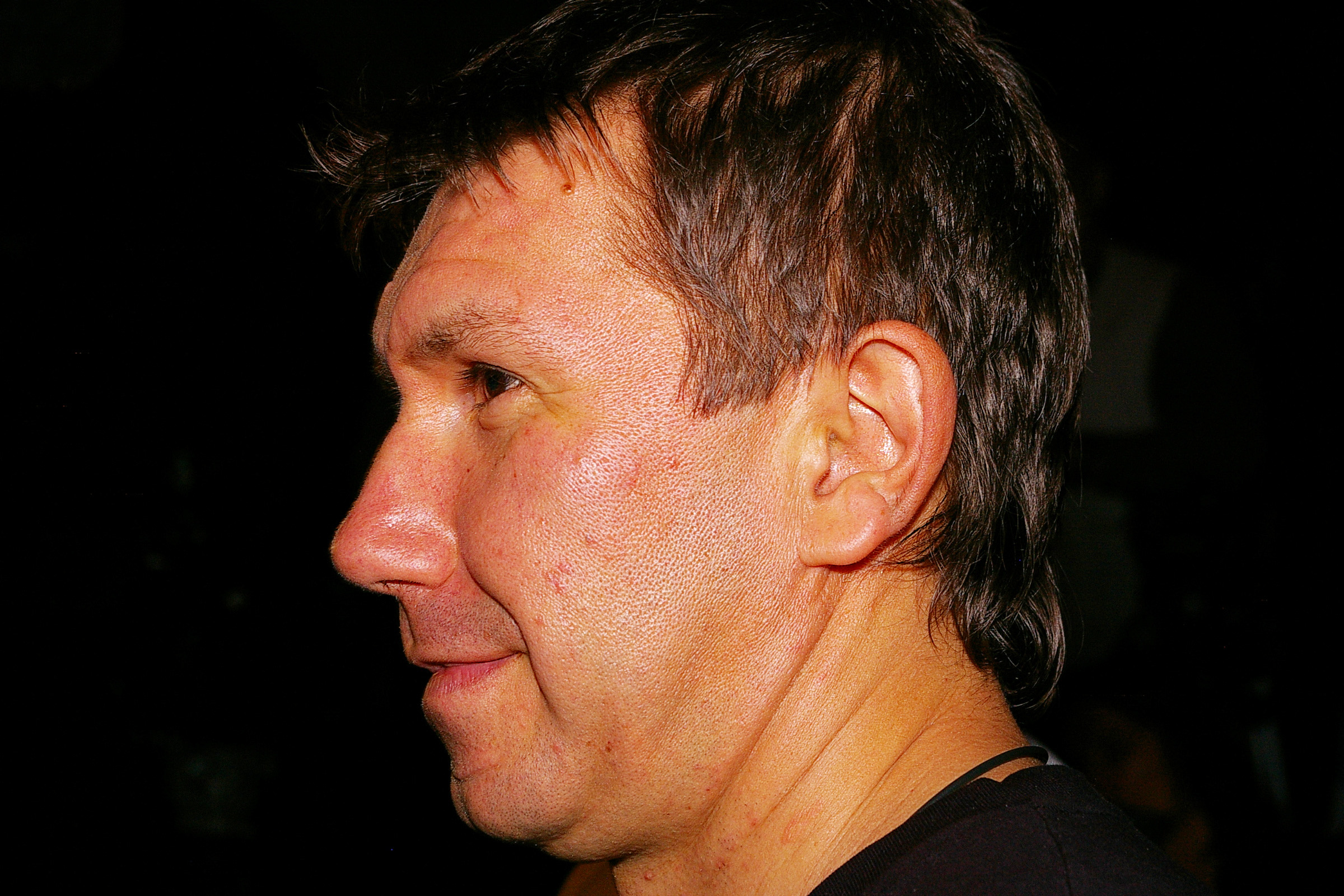
Sergei Kristovsky, 2009

Uma2rman (previously Umaturman, Uma2rmaH) is a Russian pop rock band made up of two brothers, Sergei and Vladimir Kristovsky. They have been active since 2003, releasing their first album "V Gorode N" in 2004. Additional musicians have been hired for concerts. The group consists of Dmitry Kozlov, Ruslan Semenov, Yuriy Terletskyy, Vladislav Cherednichenko, Alexey Kaplun, Sergey Solodkin, and Stanislav Veretenov.

In May 2022, Uma2rman participated in a concert organized in order to support the 2022 Russian invasion of Ukraine.

== Discography ==
=== Studio albums ===
- 2004 — "V Gorode N" (В Городе N; In Unknown City)
- 2005 — "A Mozhet, Eto Son?" (А Может Это Сон?; Maybe It's A Dream?)
- 2008 — "Kuda Privodyat Mechty" (Куда Приводят Мечты?; Where To Do Dreams Lead?)
- 2009 — "1825"
- 2011 — "V etom gorode vse sumasshedshiye" (В этом городе все сумасшедшие; Everyone Is Mad In This City)
- 2016 — "Poy, vesna!" (Пой, весна!; Sing, Spring!)
- 2018 — "Ne nashego mira" (Не нашего мира; Not ours world)
- 2024 — "Myziki ostalos malo" (Музыки осталось мало; There is little music left)

=== Singles ===
Year	Single
2004	"Praskovya" (Прасковья)
2004	"Praskovya (RMX)"
2004	"Nochnoy Dozor" (Ночной Дозор; Night Watch) (Soundtrack)
2004	"Prostit'sya" (Проститься; To Say Goodbye)
2004	"Glavnoe, Rebyata, Serdtsem Ne Staret'" (Главное, Ребята, Сердцем Не Стареть; It's most important, Guys, Not to Age with your Heart)
2005	"Uma Thurman" {Ума Турман}
2005	"Ty Daleko" (Ты Далеко; You Are Far Away)
2005	"Tennis" (Теннис)
2005	"Skazhi" (Скажи; Say)
2006	"Pis'mo Ume" (Письмо Уме; A Letter To Uma)
2006	"Kino" (Кино; Film)
2007	"V Gorode Leto" (В Городе Лето; It's Summer In The City)
2007	"Pripeve Net" (Припева Нет; There Isn't a Chorus)
2007	"Papiny Dochki" (Папины Дочки; Daddy's Daughters) (Soundtrack)
2008	"Ne Pozvonish'"(feat. Patricia Kaas) (Не Позвонишь; You Won't Call)
2008	"California" (Калифорния)
2009	"Kazhetsya" (Кажется; It Seems)
2009	"V Gorode Dozhd'" (В Городе Дождь; It's Raining In The City)
2009	"Svecha" (Свеча; Candle)
2010	"Obyasni mne" (Объясни мне; Explain to me)
2011	"V etom gorode vse sumasshedshie" (В этом городе все сумасшедшие; In this town everyone's mad)
2016	"Poy, vesna!" (Пой, весна!; Sing, Spring!)
2018	"Ne nashego mira" (Не нашего мира; Not ours world)
2024	2024 — "Myziki ostalos malo" (Музыки осталось мало; There is little music left)
