= The Priest (2009 film) =

- Directed by: Vladimir Khotinenko
- Produced by: Vera Malysheva; Natalia Gostyushina; Sergei Kravets
- Starring: Sergei Makovetsky; Nina Usatova; Liza Arzamasova
- Cinematography: Ilya Dyomin
- Music by: Alexey Rybnikov
- Production company: Orthodox encyclopedia
- Distributed by: 20th Century Fox
- Release date: 20 September 2009
- Running time: 130 minutes
- Country: Russia
- Language: Russian

The Priest (Russian: Поп, romanized: Pop) is a 2009 Russian drama film directed by Vladimir Khotinenko.

== Plot ==
The film begins in June 1941 in the backwater Russian village of Tikhoye in Soviet Latvia. Priest Alexander carries out the duties of his ministry, helped by his wife, Alevtina. Two days later, German troops occupy the village. As part of an effort to gain the local villagers' favor, the German occupiers are keen to reopen the Orthodox churches that had been closed by the Soviet authorities. Alexander is offered a position at the Pskov Orthodox Mission (Псковская православная миссия) to the Pskov oblast. An Orthodox church building in the village of Zakaty, confiscated and turned by the previous Soviet authorities into a hall for film showings and the like, is restored to its former use, with the church bell rescued from the lake. However, life under the Nazis is ambiguous and the priest must walk a tightrope (metaphorically) between faithful Christian service and loyalty to his country and people. A poignant scene is the Easter service, celebrated along with Red Army POWs surrounded by German guards. Alexander and Alevtina also secretly harbour Jewish orphans. Alevtina falls ill from contact with the POWs and puts the children first by losing herself in a snowstorm lest she infect the orphans. The film concludes with the Soviets back in power in the region and the priest subsequently imprisoned by the NKVD on collaboration charges. The epilogue shows the priest decades later, visited by the orphans he saved many years before.

== Cast ==
- Sergei Makovetsky as priest Aleksandr Ionin
- Nina Usatova as matushka (priest's wife) Alevtina
- Liza Arzamasova as Eva
- Kirill Pletnyov as Aleksandr Lugotintsev
- Yuri Tsurilo as Metropolitan Sergius

== Release ==
The film fell through at a rental cost of $6.8 million in production costs in all countries of hire amounted to only $1.7 million.
