= Olga Kuzmina =

Russian actress and dancer (born 1987)

- Ольга Кузьмина
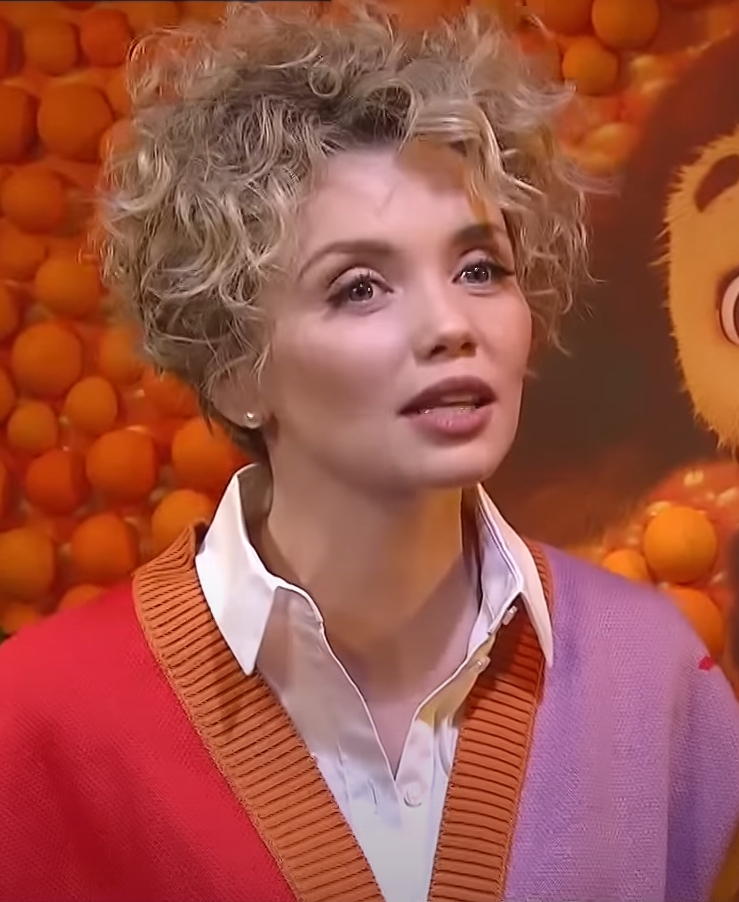
- Kuzmina in 2023
- Born: 16 June 1987 (age 39); Moscow, Russian SFSR, Soviet Union
- Citizenship: Russia; Argentina
- Occupations: Actress and dancer
- Years active: 2000–present
- Spouse(s): Aleksey Kuzmin (2010–2019); Evgeny Apanasevich (2023–present)
- Children: 2

Olga Nikolaevna Kuzmina (Note: Russian: О́льга Никола́евна Кузьмина́) (born 16 June 1987) is a Russian actress and dancer. She is best known for her role as Nastya Fomina in the sitcom Kitchen, as well as voicing Cheburashka in the Cheburashka film series (also known as Chebi in English), with the first and second film becoming the top two highest-grossing Russian films of all time. She is also the voice of Varya (Valery in the English localization) in the Fantasy Patrol series as well as Usagi Tsukino/Sailor Moon in the STS Love dub of Sailor Moon. She is also an accomplished ice skater, winning in the seventh season of the competition program Ice Age with Alexander Enbert.

== Early life ==
Olga Nikolaevna Kuzmina was born on 16 June 1987 in Moscow, Russian SFSR, Soviet Union. As a child, she studied choreography and acrobatics. At the age of eleven, she became a student at the Igor Moiseyev Ballet. Afterwards, she studied at the Faculty of Cultural Studies at the State Academy of Slavic Culture, and later transferred to the Russian Institute of Theatre Arts (GITIS), where she graduated in 2008.

== Career ==
While attending school, she debuted on an episode of the children's television series, Yeralash, in the year 2000. She would continue appearing for seven more episodes until 2014, where she portrayed a teacher.

After playing secondary roles in television series, she gained wider recognition for her role as the waitress Nastya Fomina in the television sitcom Kitchen from 2012 to 2016. She also voiced the character of Valery in the Fantasy Patrol franchise since 2016. She also voiced the titular character in the 2018 Russian dub of Sailor Moon. In an interview with 7 Days (ru), Kuzmina said that she immediately accepted the role of Sailor Moon when she was offered it. Only the first season of Sailor Moon was dubbed in Russian by STS Love, and the network aired those episodes from 1 December 2018 to 1 January 2019.

In 2023, Kuzmina voiced the character Cheburashka (Chebi) in the film of the same name. She later reprised her role in the sequel Cheburashka 2 (2026) and will voice the character again in Cheburashka 3 (2027). The first two films later became the top two highest-grossing Russian films of all time, grossing $94.5m and $83.7m respectively.

Outside of her work as an actress, she took first place in the seventh season of the competition series, Ice Age, in 2020. During the competition, she pair skated with professional Alexander Enbert.

== Personal life ==
Kuzmina met her first husband, psychologist Alexey Tereshchenko, in 2004 while she was studying at the Faculty of Cultural Studies. They were married from 2010 to 2019. They had a son named Gordey, who was born in 2013. Kuzmina learned about her pregnancy while working on Kitchen, and so the creators of the series added a storyline where her character is pregnant.

In 2023, Kuzmina married her second husband, a tour guide named Evgeny Apanasevich. In the October of that same year, the couple had a daughter named Mira-Maria in Argentina. Kuzmina also obtained her citizenship there.

== Selected filmography ==
=== Films ===
Year	Title	Role	Notes	Ref.
2011	Siberia, Monamour	Vera		
2013	Gagarin: First in Space	Marina Popovich		
2014	The Kitchen in Paris	Anastasia "Nastya" Anisimova		
2015	Ghost	Olya		
2017	Kitchen. The Last Battle	Anastasia "Nastya" Anisimova		
2021	Koschey: The Everlasting Story	Varya (Valery)	Voice	
2023	Cheburashka	Cheburashka (Chebi)	Voice	
2026	Cheburashka 2	Cheburashka (Chebi)	Voice	
2027	Cheburashka 3	Cheburashka (Chebi)	In production; voice	

=== Television ===
Year	Title	Role	Notes	Ref.
2000–2014	Yeralash	Various roles	8 episodes	
2006	Happy Together	Maya	1 episode	
2009	Univer	Katya	1 episode	
2011	The Life and Adventures of Mishka Yaponchik	Rose	Miniseries	
2012–2016	Kitchen	Anastasia "Nastya" Anisimova	30 episodes	
2016–present	Fantasy Patrol	Varya (Valery)	Voice; 19 episodes	
2019	Kitchen. War for the Hotel	Anastasia "Nastya" Anisimova	1 episode	
2019–2023	Fantasy Patrol: The Chronicles	Varya (Valery)	Voice	
2023	Squared Zebra	Cell (Checkery)	Voice; 52 episodes	
2023	The Ivanovs vs. The Ivanovs	Anna Sergeevna	7 episodes	

=== Dubbed roles ===
Year	Title	Role	Notes	Ref.
2005	Brokeback Mountain	Alma Beers Del Mar	Russian dub	
2011	Scream 4	Marnie Cooper	Russian dub	
2014–present	Paw Patrol	Everest / Sweetie / Ace	Russian dub	
2016	La La Land	Alexis	Russian dub	
2016–2022	The Powerpuff Girls	Blossom	Russian dub	
2017	The Zookeeper’s Wife	Urszula	Russian dub	
2018–2019	Sailor Moon	Usagi Tsukino / Sailor Moon	Russian STS Love dub (Season 1 only)	
