= List of Fantasy Patrol characters =

This is a list of characters from the Russian animated television series Fantasy Patrol, which premiered on Moolt in Cinema on April 30, 2016.

== Main characters ==
=== Helena ===
Helena (Russian: Алёнка) is a local resident of the city of Myshkin. She has long red pigtail hair, and brown eyes. She is a cheerful and optimistic young girl, and the best friend of Louis Alex. She is very sociable and talkative, often thinking before she does. Helena is just starting to get acquainted with magic. She is afraid of hedgehogs. Her element is fire, and her power is pyrokinesis. In the season one finale, "Light My Fire", she receives a fire key. In "The Secret of the Magic Café", she went to the Fairytale World with Vlad and befriended him in the season two premiere, "Волшебный город". Her signature color is orange and power element is fire.

She is voiced by Miroslava Karpovich (1—52 series), Anfisa Wistingausen (51, from 53 series).

=== Varya/Valery ===
Varya (Russian: Варя) is a responsible, confident, and straightforward heroine. She is the leader of the Fantasy Patrol. She has long brown hair and violet eyes. She is afraid of snakes. Her element is air. Her powers are controlling flight, wind, and teleportation. She is best friends with Queen Celeste. In the 24th episode "Best Friends", she receives an air key. Her signature color is purple and sometimes pink and her power element is air.

She is voiced by Olga Kuzmina.

=== Masha/Mary ===
Masha (Russian: Маша) is smart, practical, and strives to do everything by the rules and according to plan. She has long brown hair and green eyes. She is an excellent student, an inventor, and is well-versed with any technique. She is afraid of spiders. Her element is Earth, and her power is phytokinesis (plant manipulation). In the 18th episode "Magic Forest", she receives an Earth key. Her signature color is green and her power element is earth.

She is voiced by Yuliya Aleksandrova.

=== Snowy ===
Snowy (Russian: Снежка) is kind, silent, calm, and delicate. She has shoulder-length blonde with light blue highlight hair and light blue eyes. She doesn't like to interfere with the internal conflicts of the other girls. Her childhood friend is a plush bunny. She is afraid of her teacher, Professor Krivozub. She is the granddaughter of Santa Claus and the niece of the Snow Queen. Her element is water and her power is controlling snow and ice (cryokinesis). In "Under the Water", she received a water key. Her signature color is blue and her power element is ice.

She is voiced by Polina Kutepova.

== Recurring characters ==
=== Alice ===
Alice (Russian: Алиса) is fast, bright, and effective. She has long pink hair with bangs and blue-green eyes. She is a fashionista with a high opinion of herself. She doesn't like to admit when she's wrong, but she knows to value friendship. She is a keeper of time. Her first appearance is in "Хранительница времени". Her signature color is pink and yellow, and the element power is Timekeeper.

She is voiced by Glafira Tarkhanova.

=== Alex Louis ===
Alex (Russian: Саша) is the best friend of Helena. It was hinted that he has feelings for Helena which she reciprocates. In "A fiery guest" it is revealed that he was the one who stole Helena's bracelet to make him a wizard, but Helena sympathised with him and became friends again and trusted each other more.

=== Johnny ===
Johnny (Russian: Иванушка) is a graduate of the Magic College and the current curator of the fabulous library of the city of Myshkin. He was born into a family of famous wizards who had high hopes for him, but he preferred childish pranks rather than study. While working in the library, he was tricked by Fantom and turned into a goat. For a long time, the young man was in captivity of the villain, who, having assumed his appearance, was hiding. When Alex fell into the basement in story 25, they helped each other together and fled, along the way Johnny returned to his human form. After this incident, he took up his mind and began to develop his skills in magic. Despite the horror he endured, he remains friendly, kind and sweet. He also appears in the Magic Clock book, where he found Alice's lost watch that the Werewolf Chief wanted to steal. First appears in the episode "Everything's Upside Down".
