= Fib the Truth =

- Theatrical release poster
- Russian: Соври мне правду
- Directed by: Olga Akatieva
- Written by: Victoria Ostrovskaya; Dmitry Magonov; Nelly Vysotskaya
- Produced by: Georgy Shabanov; Olga Akatieva; Tatyana Trenina
- Starring: Darya Melnikova; Yevgeny Romantsov; Elizaveta Kononova; Pavel Priluchny
- Cinematography: Anton Zenkovich
- Edited by: Maria Sergeenkova; Yevgenia Bakhareva
- Music by: Sergey Luran
- Production companies: Start; Okapi Production
- Distributed by: Central Partnership
- Release date: 9 September 2021 (Russia)
- Running time: 88 minutes
- Country: Russia
- Language: Russian

Fib the Truth, also known as Lie to Me the Truth (Russian: Соври мне правду, romanized: Sovri mne pravdu) is a 2021 Russian erotic thriller film directed by Olga Akatieva.

== Plot ==
A couple in love retire away from civilization. They have been together for not so long, but the man is sure he met his only one. The sudden arrival of the younger sister, and then the girl's ex-boyfriend, ruins the romantic idyll. Heroes become hostages of each other's desires and passions. Romance is replaced by passion, and innocent flirting leads to fierce jealousy. More and more dangerous psychological games threaten to lead to a cruel denouement.

== Cast ==
- Darya Melnikova as older sister
- Yevgeny Romantsov as older sister's boyfriend
- Pavel Priluchny as older sister's ex-boyfriend
- Elizaveta Kononova as younger sister
- Alexander Oblasov as police officer
- Grigory Vernik as fellow traveler

== Production ==
The film was shot in a country house in the Moscow Oblast. The house was rented for filming. Filming was completed in November 2020.
