= Anastasia Sivayeva =

Russian actress

- Анастасия Сиваева
- Born: Anastasia Sergeevna Sivayeva; 10 November 1991 (age 34); Moscow, RSFSR, USSR
- Occupation: Actress
- Years active: 2003–present

Anastasia Sergeyevna Sivayeva (Russian: Анастаси́я Серге́евна Сива́ева; born 10 November 1991) is a Russian theater, cinema and television actress, best known for the role of Darya Vasnetsova in the sitcom Daddy's Daughters.

== Biography ==
Sivayeva was born in Moscow, Russian SFSR, Soviet Union (now Russia).

In 2010 she joined the acting faculty of the Institute of Contemporary Management, Cinema and Television (the studio of Evgeny Zharikov and Natalya Gvozdikova).

== Filmography ==
Year	Title	Role	Notes
2004	Delusion	episode	TV series
2005	Through Line	Lyalya	TV film
2005	Words and Music	Margo's daughter	
2007–2013	Daddy's Daughters	Darya Vasnetsova	TV series
2010	Last Minute	Kristina	TV series
2014	Ax		Short
