= Trace (TV series) =

Television series

- Also known as: След
- Genre: Criminal, Detective, Drama
- Created by: Konstantin Ernst; Vsevolod Aravin; Yuri Kharnas
- Starring: Olga Koposova; Vladimir Tashlykov; Anna Dankova; Yevgeny Kulakov; Pavel Shuvaev; Sergey Pioro; Georgy Teslya-Gerasimov, Andrey Lavrov and others
- Country of origin: Russia
- Original language: Russian
- No. of seasons: 36
- No. of episodes: 3503

Production
- Executive producers: Alexander Levin; Boris Kokin
- Running time: 30–59 minutes
- Production companies: TeleRoman; OTK

Original release
- Network: Channel One Russia
- Release: 3 September 2007 – 2011
- Network: Petersburg – Channel 5
- Release: 2011 – present

Trace (Russian: След, romanized: Sled) is a Russian crime drama television series created by Konstantin Ernst about employees of a fictional government agency called the "Federal Expert Service" (FES). The show was initially broadcast on Channel One from 3 September 2007 to 25 August 2011. Since 5 September 2011, the show been broadcast on 5TV.

== Premise ==
The show tells the story of the Federal Expert Service (FES), a new governmental agency created by the MVD to solve important criminal cases. The goal of the FES (Russian: "Федеральная экспертная служба") is to bring together specialists in various areas such as software development, ballistics, forensics and investigations to combat crime. The FES has experts in a wide array of fields at its disposal, and as such, it is tasked with investigating highly complex and intricate criminal cases. Launched as an experiment, the FES trains young professionals and it assists other governmental organizations as the FSB and MVDs in solving crimes. There have been numerous cases of Russian citizens requesting assistance from the FES, because they were unaware that the organization was fictional. The Press Service of the Ministry of Internal Affairs of Primorsky Krai asked residents to ignore scammers posing as employees of the FES.

== Creators ==
- General Producer — Alexander Levin
- Executive Producer — Boris Kokin
- Directors — Vsevolod Aravin (Episodes 1 - 40), Yury Kharnas (from Episode 41)
- Chief Editor — Alexander Shuravin
- Film Directors — Armen Aruryunyan-Eletsky, Petr Krotenko, Salavat Vakhitov, Kamil Zakirov and others.
- Writers — Alexander Shuravin, Anastasiya Demidova, Alexey Demidov, Pavel Peskov, Kirill Pletner, Vasily Koryakin, Darya Kokorina and others.

== Cast ==
- Olga Koposova — Galina Rogozina, Police Colonel, MD, The Head of FES (from Episode 1)
- Vladimir Tashlikov — Nikolai Kruglov, Major Police Senior Officer, Deputy Head of FES (from Episode 1)
- Anna Dankova — Valentina Antonova, The Medical Examiner (from Episode 1)
- Vladimir Sveshnikov — Peter Romashin, professor and Medical Examiner (Episodes 1 - 409, Episode 551)
- Yevgeny Kulakov — Ivan Tikhonov, programmer, biologist and The Head of The Computer Department (Episode 1)
- Olga Zeyger — Tatyana Belaya, ballistics, Lieutenant / Captain of Police, detective (Episodes 2 – 335, from Episode 928)
- Pavel Shuvaev — Sergey Maysky, Major of GRU, Senior Officer. Biker. (from Episode 3)
- Tatyana Isakova — Daria Maximova, programmer, chemist (Episodes 23 – 110)
- Andrey Lavrov — Constantine Kotov, Police Captain, detective (Episodes 25 – 909, from Episode 1060)
- Sergey Pioro — Igor Shustov, Police Captain, ballistics, detective (from Episode 27)
- Georgy Teslya-Gerasimov — Konstantin Lisitsyn, Major Police Senior Officer (from Episode 27)
- Oleg Osipov — Sergey Belozerov, programmer, biologist (Episodes 31 – 508)
- Olga Nedovodina — Ekaterina Gordeeva, Major Police Senior Officer (Episodes 39 – 90)
- Anastasia Gruzdeva — Alla Semenchuk, Assistant (Episodes 87 – 489)
- Elena Golovisina — Elena Shustova, Senior Police Lieutenant, programmer, the wife of Igor Shustov (Episodes 118 – 242)
- Julia Vaishnur — Julia Sokolova, The Captain of Police, detective (Episodes 118 – 553)
- Anastasia Gulimova — Oxana Amelina, Senior Police Lieutenant, programmer (from Episode 263)
- Oleg Valkman — Boris Selivanov, medical examiner, a former plastic surgeon (Episodes 448 — 2538)
- Stanislav Erklievskiy — Paul Granik, Captain of Police, detective (from Episode 547)
- Ruslan Sasin — Andrew Kholodov, Police Captain, programmer (from Episode 566)
- Nina Gogaeva — Margarita Vlasova, Police Captain, detective (Episodes 572 – 847)
- Sergey Kovalenko — Stepan Danilov, Captain of Police, detective (from Episode 632)
- Vladislav Malenko — Roman Aristov, Major Police Senior Officer (from Episode 668)
- Alexandra Popova — Olga Dunayeva, Senior Lieutenant of Police, detective (from Episode 925)
- Marianna Kataeva — Alyona, Office Manager. (Episodes 4 – 57)
- Sergey Lavigin — Andrei Romanov, trainee, an employee of FES (Episodes 17, 21)
- Elena Lander — Vika
- Alexey Kulichkov — Alexei Vinogradov, Police Captain, an employee of FES (Episodes 23, 24, 26)
- Elena Nikitina — Victoria Gromova, programmer, replaces Ivan Tikhonov (Episodes 24, 27)
- Oleg Zhiritskiy — Valery, trainee, an employee of FES (Episodes 26, 28, 29, 30, 33)
- Irina Medvedeva — Daria Gordeeva, Laboratory Assistant, replaces Ivan Tikhonov (Episode 32)
- Nikolay Vinogradov — Captain of FES (Episodes 90 – 102)
- Valeria Skorokhodova — Anna Shmeleva, Police Captain, ballistics (Episodes 385, 388, 390)
- Vladimir Smirnov — Andrey Morozov, Senior Police Lieutenant, programmer (Episodes 545, 548, 550, 551)
- Vsevolod Grinevskiy — Ilya Danilov, detective (Episodes 613, 614)
- Ekaterina Pilipenko — Olga Gorokhova, Senior Lieutenant of Police, detective (Episodes 868, 880)
- Sergey Batrak - Bubnov, expert on antiques (Episode 859)
- Elena Khlibko — Taisya Kaplevich, witness during interrogation (Episode 1062)
- Mariya Fomina — Varya Golinskaya

== Production ==
The filming process is intense: six episodes are shot at once. In the first months of the project, shooting could be up to 18 hours per day. Later on, the shooting time was reduced to an average of 12 hours per day. Many actors, including lead actors, felt they were overworked, and left the project. By Episode 450, 3500 actors had appeared on the show.

Several sets have been created for the show such as a laboratory, a meeting room, a futuristic office, a morgue, and an interrogation room.

== Awards and nominations ==
TEFI Awards:

- 2009 Best TV series
- 2011 Best TV series
- 2012 Best Director of TV film / series

Prize of The Association of Professional Producers of Film and Television in TV-Movie:

- 2014 Best TV series
- 2015 Best TV series
- 2019 — special prize "for realizing a producer's dream"
