= Darya Melnikova =

Russian actress (born 1992)

- Дарья Мельникова
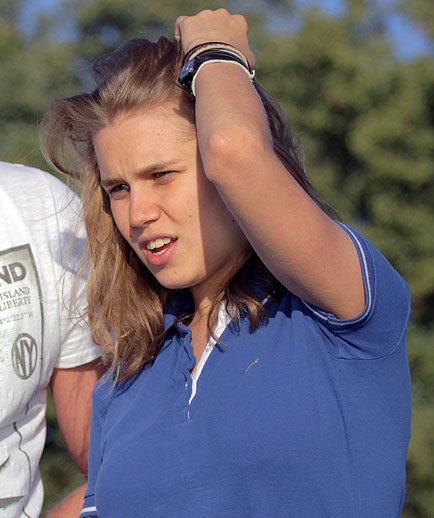
- Melnikova on the set of video for song "Love Above the Clouds" in 2010
- Born: Darya Alekseyevna Melnikova; 9 February 1992 (age 34); Omsk, Russia
- Occupation: Actress
- Years active: 2006–present
- Spouse: Artur Smolyaninov (m. 2013; div. 2021)
- Children: 3

Darya Alekseyevna Melnikova (Russian: Да́рья Алексе́евна Ме́льникова; born 9 February 1992) is a Russian actress in theater, film and television.

== Biography ==
Darya Melnikova was born in Omsk, Russia. She learned to play the piano at a music school and was involved in ballet.

In 2009, Melnikova was admitted to the M.S. Schepkin Higher Theatre School (Institute).

Since 2013, the actress has been with the Moscow Yermolova Theatre.

== Career ==
In 2006 Melnikova debuted. She played the main role in the film Cinderella 4×4. Everything starts with desire. It was released in 2008. Her performance in this film earned her two nominations. The aspiring actress played 14-year-old Cinderella — an ordinary teen who is a little bit strange, dreamy and always gets into strange and unusual situations. For this role Melnikova was awarded the prize for the Best Female child role at the XVII Open Film Festival of CIS countries "Kinoshock - 2008" and Best Actress in a children’s movie at XII All-Russian Festival of Visual Arts.

But the real fame came to the actress in 2007. She played the role of Eugenia "Zhenya" Vasnetsova, the most athletic of the daughters, in the TV series Daddy's Daughters.

In 2009, Darya starred in the film Ash Waltz and in two series: The rules of theft and That's Life. In the same year she entered Shchukin Theater School in Moscow.

Melnikova has become the face of L’Oréal. The actress starred in a L’Oréal Paris Pure Zone commercial.

Darya enjoys photography and she is going to release the book of her stories and photos titled Pictures to attract attention.

== Personal life ==
Melnikova had a son on October 27, 2015 with her husband, Artur Smolyaninov. In December 2018 they had a second son, Mark. On June 6, 2021, the actress announced her divorce from Artur Smolyaninov.

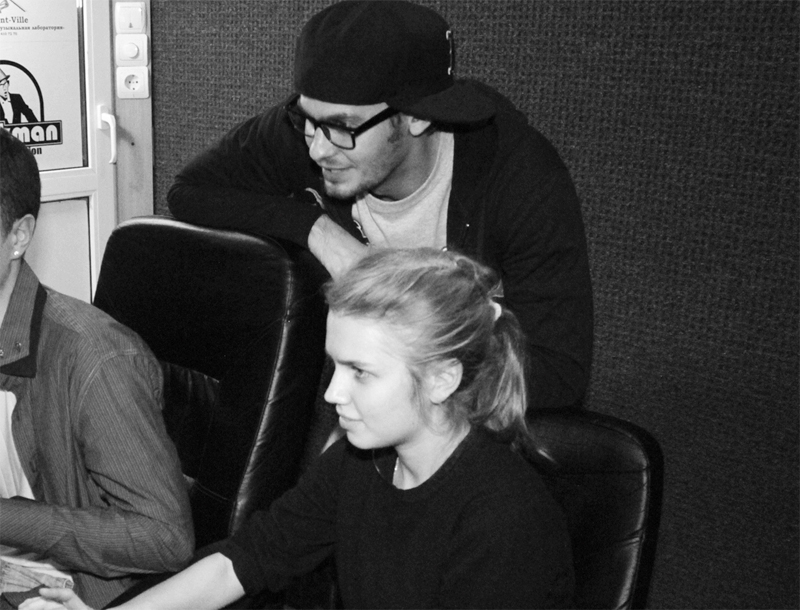
Andrey Batt and Darya Melnikova at the studio, recording Letniy...

== Filmography ==
Year	Title	Role	Notes
2007-13	Daddy's Daughters	Eugenia Vasnetsova	TV series
2008	Squirrel in a cage	Dasha	TV series
2008	Cinderella 4×4. Everything starts with desire	Cinderella	
2009	Ash Waltz	Luba Sinicha	
2009	The rules of theft	Angela Botova	TV series
2009	Heart Captain Nemov	Vika	TV series
2009	That's Life	Lena Sokolova	
2010	Garages	Olya	TV series
2010-11	The Secret Service Agent's Memories	Fekla	TV series (two seasons)
2011	The Secret Service Agent's Memories	Fekla	TV movie
2011	Groom	Olya	TV
2012	Steel Butterfly	(Сhuma) Vika Chumakova	
2012	Mystery Dion	(voice)	Animated series
2013-2016	Alisa Knows What to Do!	Alisa Selezneva (voice)	Animated series
2013	Gagarin: First in Space	Zoe Gagarina in adolescence, sister of Yuri Gagarin	
2013	Fierce	Marina	TV series
2014	Invisible	maid Tatiana	
2014	Heterosexual Major Sokolova	Nina Matrosova	
2014	Boatswain Seagull	Mariya	Mini-series
2015	Wizard balance. Mystery Sukharev	WiFi (voice)	Cartoon
2015	Once	Tanka	
2015	SOS, Ded Moroz, or all come true!	Lera	
2016	Satellites	Lena Ogorodnikova	Mini-series
2021	Fib the Truth	elder sister	
2022	YuZZZ	Lusha	TV series
2023	Khochu ne mogu!	Sasha	TV series
2023	King and Jester	Olga Gorsheneva/The Widow	TV series
2023	Daddy's Daughters: New	Eugenia Vasnetsova	TV series
2023	The Magic Police Station	Elena Fedotova	TV series
2023	Second-to-last instance	Lyuda	TV series
