= Worm (2006 film) =

2006 film

- Directed by: Aleksei Muradov
- Written by: Andrey Migachev; Igor Talpa
- Starring: Sergey Shnyryov
- Cinematography: Robert Filatov
- Release date: 28 June 2006
- Running time: 100 minutes
- Country: Russia
- Language: Russian

Worm (Russian: Червь) is a 2006 Russian thriller drama film directed by Aleksei Muradov. It was entered into the 28th Moscow International Film Festival.

== Cast ==
- Sergey Shnyryov as Sergei
- Anastasiya Sapozhnikova as Lyusya
- Vadim Demchog as Don Mook
- Dmitriy Persin
- Aleksandr Naumov as Sergei's father
- Galina Danilova as Sergei's mother
- Sofya Ledovskikh as Sergei's sister
- Anna Artemchuk as Lyusya as a child (as Anya Artemchuk)
- Mikhail Zayarin as Sergei as a child
- Tamara Spiricheva as Inga's grandmother
- Anastasia Yakovleva as girl with integrals
- Dana Agisheva as Jungia
