= Butterfly Tale =

- Film poster
- Directed by: Sophie Roy
- Written by: Heidi Foss; Lienne Sawatsky
- Produced by: Justin Rebelo Chantale Pagé; Tania Pinto da Cunha; Marc Gabizon; Marks Aldenhoven
- Starring: Tatiana Maslany; Mena Massoud
- Edited by: Robert Yates
- Music by: Shawn Mendes; Johnny Orlando; Blü Dog Media Nancy Brault
- Production companies: CarpeDiem Film & TV; Ulysses Filmproduktion; Senator Film Köln
- Distributed by: Pink Parrot Media (Worldwide sales); Vortex Media (Canada); Wild Bunch (Germany)
- Release dates: September 16, 2023 (Atlantic International Film Festival); September 29, 2023 (Spain); October 13, 2023 (Canada); February 1, 2024 (Germany)
- Running time: 82 minutes
- Countries: Canada; Germany
- Language: English

Butterfly Tale is a 2023 animated adventure film directed by Sophie Roy and written by Heidi Foss and Lienne Sawatsky. It features the voices of Tatiana Maslany and Mena Massoud. Based on the real-life migration of monarch butterflies, the plot follows a young butterfly named Patrick who goes on an adventure over North America to follow his dream of flight although he has one wing.

== Plot ==
Butterfly Tale is an animated feature film about Patrick, a teen-aged butterfly with one wing. The movie takes place in the migration of monarch butterflies, with his best friend Marty and another monarch butterfly with a fear of heights by the name of Jennifer, made to highlight the difficulty of the migration of monarch butterflies.

== Cast ==
- Mena Massoud as Patrick, a shy teenage monarch butterfly who was born with a smaller wing
- Tatiana Maslany as Jennifer, a rebellious female monarch butterfly
- Lucinda Davis as Marty, a dimwitted knit cap-wearing caterpillar who is Patrick's best friend
- Richard M. Dumont as Jay, a villainous yellow grosbeak
- Edda Fischer as Margaret, Patrick's mother

== Production ==
In November 2022, it was announced that Maslany and Massoud were cast as the voices of Jennifer and Patrick respectively, as well the film will feature original songs by Shawn Mendes and Johnny Orlando. The film is a Canadian-German co-production between CarpeDiem Film & TV, Ulysses Filmproduktion and Senator Film Köln with animation done at Singing Frog Studio in Montreal and Studio Rakete in Hamburg. It marks Sophie Roy's feature directorial debut.

== Release ==
The film was first released in Spain on September 29, 2023, one month later in Canada on October 13, 2023, before releasing in Germany on February 1, 2024.

== Television series ==
In 2021, prior to the release of the film, CarpeDiem, Ulysses Filmproduktion and distributor Pink Parrot announced plans for a spinoff prequel television series called Butterfly Academy or L’Académie des monarques in French. The show was envisioned as running for 52 eleven-minute episodes, with it set for release in the third quarter of 2023. In 2024, the series received financing from the Canada Media Fund, Shaw Rocket Fund and SODEC. In 2025, it received an investment from Wallimage, as the series became a Belgian co-production with AgentDouble Productions and Waooh!. That same month, Shaw Rocket Fund announced that the series would begin airing in September 2026, with a broadcast in English-speaking Canada on CBC, in French-speaking Canada on Ici Radio-Canada Télé as well as TFO, and in Belgium on RTBF.

In April 2026, Pink Parrot confirmed the first 13 episodes would be completed in June, with the full season ready for broadcasters in July. The following month, CBC confirmed the 26 eleven-minute episode series would be part of its fall broadcast season. The show premiered in Belgium on RTBF Auvio on July 2, 2026 with it later airing on La Trois. In Canada, the English version debuted on CBC Gem on August 28 before airing on CBC's linear channel on September 8, 2026. Ici TOU.TV will stream the series in French starting October 8, 2026.
