= Timur Rodriguez =

Russian comedian and singer (born 1979)

- Тимур Родригез
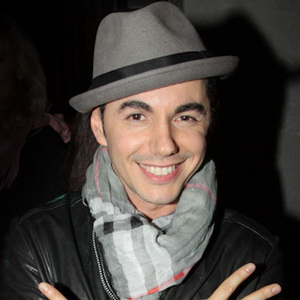
- Born: Timur Kerimov; October 14, 1979 (age 46); Penza, RSFSR, USSR
- Other name: Teymur Karimov
- Occupations: singer, comedian, entertainer, TV host, actor, DJ

Timur Mikhailovich Rodriguez (Russian: Тимур Микаилович Родригез, born Kerimov, Russian: Керимов, October 14, 1979 in Penza), often stylized as T-moor Rodriguez, is a Russian showman, singer, TV and radio personality, known for his participation on the TV projects KVN, Comedy Club and «Yuzhnoye Butovo», and leading programs «Crocodile», «Sexy chart» and «Dances without rules».

Timur's father Mikail Karimov (Микаил Керимов) is Azerbaijani and his mother Zlata Efimovna Levina (Злата Ефимовна Левина) is Jewish. Mikayil is an actor in a puppet theater and Zlata is a translator and teacher of English and German.

From 2010, Timur became known as the singer, the executor of the songs "Passion" (duet with Ani Lorak), "About You" and "Hurting For You". In April 2011 release of his new single "Tell Me", and in summer – "Out in space", in the autumn of 2011 – "Better not be", in the winter of 2012 – "Welcome to the Night", in the summer of 2012 – "Jump" (duet with DJ Smash), in the autumn of 2012 – "I Believe in Your Love".

He appeared in the second season of ice show contest Ice Age.

== Career ==
=== Hosted TV shows ===
- «Знакомство с мамой» (Muz-TV)
- «Натуральный обмен» (Muz-TV)
- «Чемпионат MИPA» (Muz-TV)
- «Бешенл Джеографик» (TNT Russia)
- «Звезды против Караоке» (TNT Russia)
- «Танцы без правил» (TNT Russia)
- «Чемодан историй» (Mir)
- «КомпроМарио» (MUSICBOX)
- «Крокодил» (Muz-TV)
- «Sexy Чарт» (Muz-TV)
- «Музыкальный ринг» (NTV Russia)
- «TOP 10» (MUSICBOX)
- Billboard чарт (Muz-TV)
- «Минутное Дело»(Rossiya 1)

=== Filmography ===
- Happy Together (2006, TV series) as actor
- Office Romance. Our Time (2011) as showman
- Koschey: The Everlasting Story (2021) as Sword Kladenets (voice)

=== Music videos ===
Year	Clip	Director	Album
2009	«Увлечение feat. Ani Lorak»	Pavel Khudyakov	TBA
2010	«О тебе»	Pavel Khudyakov	TBA
2011	«Out in space»	Pavel Khudyakov	TBA
2011	«Лучше не будет»	Sergey Tkachenko	TBA
2012	«Welcome to the night»	Sergey Tkachenko	TBA
2012	«Jump feat. DJ Smash»	Pavel Khudyakov	TBA
2012	«Я верю в твою любовь»	Sergey Tkachenko	TBA

== Family ==
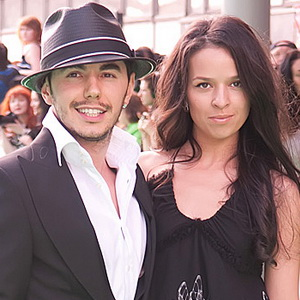
Timur Rodriguez with his wife Anna Devochkina at the ceremony of Muz-TV award on June 3, 2011

Timur is married and has 2 children.
