= Liza Arzamasova =

Russian actress (born 1995)

- Лиза Арзамасова
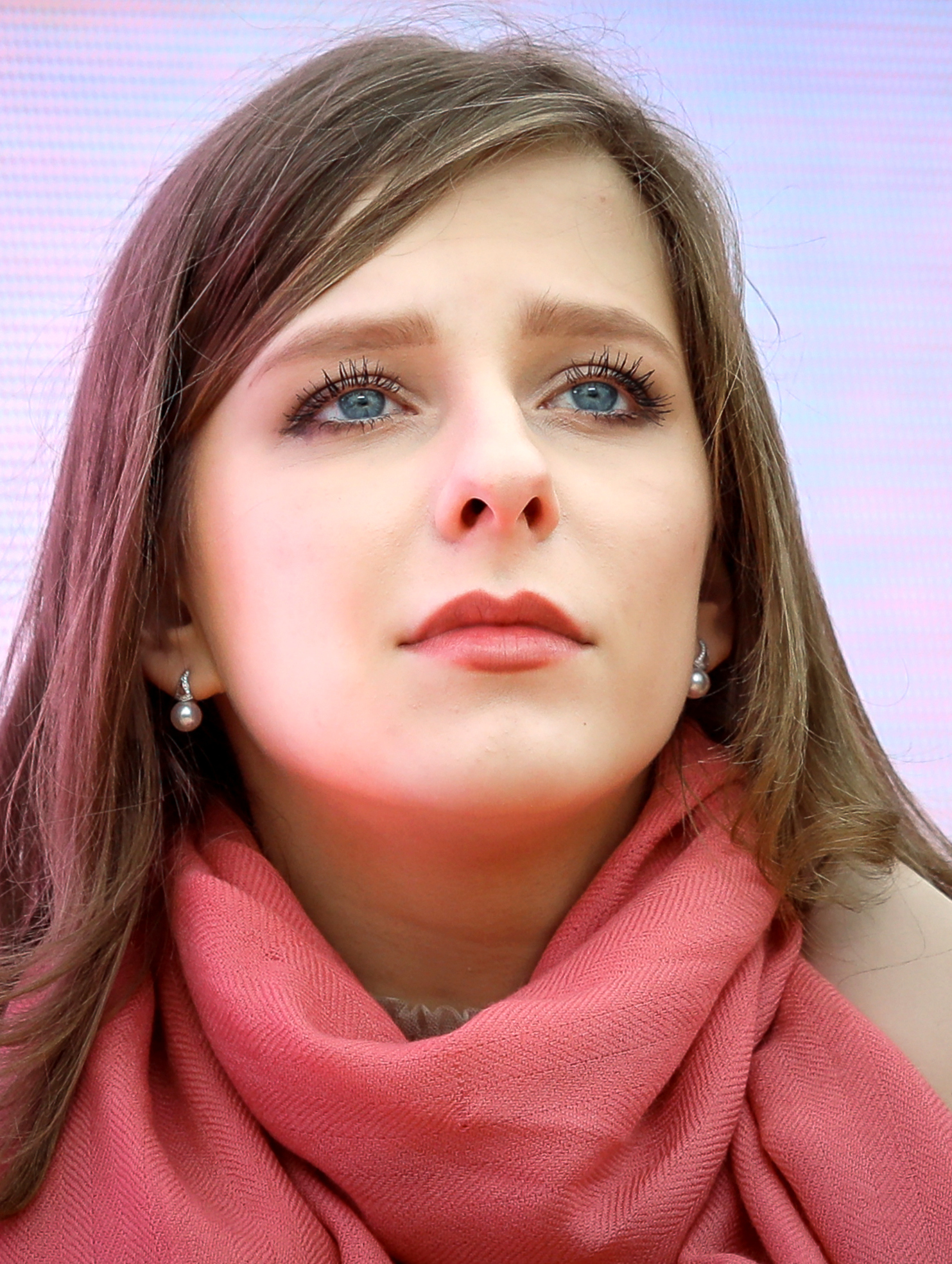
- Arzamasova in 2017
- Born: Elizaveta Nikolaevna Arzamasova; March 17, 1995 (age 31); Moscow, Russia
- Education: Russian Academy of Theatre Arts
- Occupation: Actress
- Years active: 1999–present
- Website: http://www.arzamasova.ru/

Elizaveta Nikolaevna Arzamasova (Russian: Елизаве́та Никола́евна Арзама́сова, or less formally Russian: Ли́за Арзама́сова; born March 17, 1995) is a Russian actress.

== Biography ==
Elizaveta Arzamasova was born in Moscow. She began her acting career at the age of four. When she was 8, she played the main role in the musical Annie (director – Nina Chusova). In 2004, at the 9th theater festival "Moscow debuts" she was awarded for that role the Audience Choice Award. At the same time Liza was engaged in the music studio at the Russian Academy of Theatre Arts - GITIS. Her mother, Yuliya Arzamasova, placed on one of the sites photos and summaries of Liza. She got a call from the Moscow Variety Theatre, they asked about her daughter and invited her to audition.

Liza became popular after the TV series Daddy's Daughters, where she played one of the main roles – Galina Vasnetsova.

On January 30, 2010, at the age of 14 she played the role of Juliet in Romeo and Juliet on the stage of Moscow C.S. Stanislavski Drama Theatre.

She appeared in the ninth season of ice show contest Ice Age.

== Personal life ==
Since 20 December 2020, she has been married to figure skater and coach Ilya Averbukh. On 14 August 2021, the couple had a son, named Lev. On 8 August 2024, the couple had a daughter, named Liya.

== Charity ==
In 2016, she became a trustee of the Starost v Radost Foundation. The foundation provides support to elderly people and people with disabilities.

In October 2019, the Bulgakov House Museum-Theatre staged a performance based on Arzamasova's play If I Were..., with proceeds from ticket sales donated to the Starost v Radost Foundation.

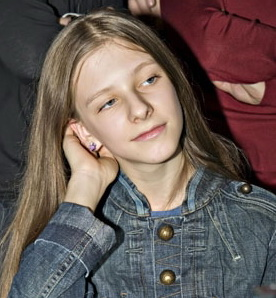
Liza Arzamasova as a child actress at a press conference for the film's release in February 2009.

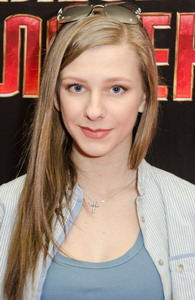
Liza Arzamasova in 2013

== Filmography ==
=== Films ===
Year	Title	Role	Notes
2002	The Ark	Maria	
2002	The Soul Keeper	orphan girl	
2004	Package from Mars	Liza	Episode
2006	Caught in time	Alina Eryomina	
2006	Wolfhound (2006 film)	crying girl	Episode
2009	Love in the Big City	Vera	
2009	The Priest (film)	Eva	
2009	Ash Waltz	Lena	
2010	Benefit	Anya	fan Artist
2012	Brave	Princess Merida	Russian dubbing
2012	The Snow Queen (2012 film)	Pirate Leader's Daughter	voice
2012	Little Red Riding Hood	princess	musical
2016	72 hours		
2017	Partner	Katya	

=== TV Series ===
Year	Title	Role	Notes
2001	Line of Defense	Masha	TV series
2002	ChalkZone	Rudy Tabootie	Russian Dubbing
2004	Place In The Sun	Margo	episodes (series 5, 6, 8)
2004-13	Kulagin and Partners	Nadya	TV series
2005	Echelon	Katya	TV series 6-8
2005	Private Detective	Dasha	TV series
2005	The Return of the thirtieth	Yulya	TV
2006	Under a rain of bullets	Alenka	Mini-series, Children of General
2007-13	Daddy's Daughters	Galina Vasnetsova	TV series
2007	I detective	Marina, daughter detective Maximova	TV series
2007	His children	Lada Bezuglova	main role
2007	Adulthood girl Polina Subbotina	Polina childhood	TV series
2008	The agency "Dream"	Lidka	TV
2009	The Brothers Karamazov	Barbara Snegireva	TV series
2010	Hedgehog came out of the mist	Alya Smirnova	Mini-series
2011	Dostoevsky	Sofia Kovalevskaya	
2016	Trepalov and Wallet	Serafima	TV series
2016	Ekaterina	Louise Augusta of Hesse-Darmstadt	TV series
