= Daddy's Daughters =

- Written by: Alexey Trotsyuk, Vitaly Shlyappo, Leonid Kuprido
- Directed by: Vyacheslav Dusmukhametov, Alexander Zhigalkin
- Composers: Sergey Kristovsky, Vladimir Kristovsky («Uma2rman»)
- No. of seasons: 20
- No. of episodes: 410

Production
- Producers: Vyacheslav Murugov, Alexander Rodnyansky
- Running time: 25 minutes

Original release
- Network: STS
- Release: 3 September 2007 – 30 April 2013

Daddy's Daughters (Russian: Папины дочки, romanized: Papiny Dochki) is a Russian TV series that aired for 20 seasons from September 3 2007 to April 30 2013. Made by "Yellow, Black and White" film company, the show revolves around family of father and his five daughters, whose mother left, but eventually returned for later seasons. The series has very high television ratings and has won multiple awards: in 2008 received the "TEFI" award for the "Best New TV Series" and the "Star Bridge" award for the "Best children's and youth's TV programme"; in 2009 Andrey Leonov and Nonna Grishaeva won two more "TEFI" as "Favourite Actor" and "Favourite Actress"; in 2010 the series got the "Golden Eagle" award for the "Best Screenplay"; and in 2011 it was named "The Most-Watched Scripted Series" for the "TV Star" award. In 2023, the renewed format also received an award for the "Best Series of the Year" and become one of the-most watched TV series on the online platforms, such as Kinopoisk or Start. Unlike many other Russian sitcoms of those years, this is an original series and is not an adaptation of a foreign show.

== Cast ==
Actor	Role
Andrey Leonov	Sergey Vasnetsov, psychologist
Nonna Grishaeva	Lyudmila Vasnetsova, Sergey's wife
Miroslava Karpovich	Maria Vasnetsova, first daughter
Anastasia Sivaeva	Daria Vasnetsova, second daughter
Daria Melnikova	Evgenia Vasnetsova, third daughter
Elizaveta Arzamasova	Galina Vasnetsova, fourth daughter
Ekaterina Starshova	Polina Vasnetsova, fifth daughter
Olga Volkova	Antonina Semyonovna, grandmother
Tatiana Orlova	Tamara Kozhemyatko, Sergey's secretary
Alexander Oleshko	Vasily Fedotov, Sergey's client, oligarch
Alexander Samoilenko	Andrey Antonov, Sergey's best friend, dentist
Nina Persiyaninova	Taisia Kirillovna, school principal

== Spin-off ==
A spin-off "Папины дочки. Новые" was released on 18 September 2023 and so far produced six more seasons. It shows the life of Daria Vasnetsova's family, her husband and their four daughters.

=== Cast ===
Actor	Role
Filipp Bledny	Veniamin Vasiliev, physicist
Polina Denisova	Sofia Vasilieva, first daughter
Vitalia Kornienko	Elizaveta Vasilieva, second daughter
Eva Smirnova	Diana Vasilieva, third daughter
Polina Ainutdinova	Arina Vasilieva, fourth daughter
Alexey Demidov	Boris, Veniamin's best friend and neighbour
Olga Khokhlova	Aelita Stepanovna, Veniamin's mother
Ksenia Teplova	Tatiana Skachkova, family psychologist
Timofey Kochnev	Igor Yakushev, Sofia's boyfriend
Yulia Frantz	Irina Yakusheva, Igor's mother
Savely Kudryashov	Dmitry Kaletin, Elizaveta's boyfriend
Sergey Godin	Yuri Kaletin, Dmitry's father, restaurant owner

All main characters from the original series returned to play their roles as relatives or family friends.
