= Miroslava Karpovich =

Russian actress and model (born 1986)

- Мирослава Карпович
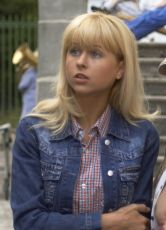
- Karpovich on the set of the film in 2007.
- Born: Miroslava Olegovna Karpovich; 1 March 1986 (age 40); Berdyansk, Ukrainian SSR, Soviet Union
- Citizenship: Russian
- Occupations: Actress, model, TV presenter
- Years active: 2006—present
- Height: 1.75 m (5 ft 9 in)

Miroslava Olegovna Karpovich (Russian: Миросла́ва Оле́говна Карпо́вич, Ukrainian: Мирослава Олегівна Карпович; born March 1, 1986) is a Russian actress, model and TV presenter. She is best known for her role as Maria Vasnetsova in Daddy's Daughters.

== Roles in the theater ==
=== MAT them. Chekhov ===
Title	Role	Director
Pyshka	Mademoiselle Fifi	George Tovstonogov
Not To Part With His Beloved	Madeleine	Victor Ryzhakov
You	Victoria	Victor Ryzhakov
Nameless Star	Eleanor Zamfirescu	Alena Anokhina

=== Theatrical Agency Art-Partner XXI ===
Title	Role
Family circumstances	Lida
Alarm in a dovecote	Myurel

=== Auditions ===
Year	Title	Role
2006	Transition age	Nadezhda Bulkina

== Filmography ==
Year	Title	Role
2007–2013	Daddy's Daughters	Maria Vasnetsova
2007	Tyson	Svetulya
2007	Holy Cause	Katyunya
2008	Plus One	Rimma
2008	The New Year's Rate Plan	Olechka
2008	Manticore	nurse
2009	Dove	Maya
2010	Tamada. Bayan. Services.	Accordionist
2011	All Inclusive	newlywed
2013—2016	Alisa Knows What to Do!	Natalie White (voice)
2016—2020	Fantasy Patrol	Helena
2017	The Bride	wife
2019—2020	Fantasy Patrol: The Chronicles	Helena

=== TV ===
Year	Title	Note
2008	Good jokes	Guest
2008	The Smartest	Guest
2009	Stories in Detail	Guest
2008–2009	Say	Guest

== Awards and nominations ==
Year	Award	Category	Film	Result
2006	The Prize "Gold leaf"	Best Actress	Play "You"	Won
2007	Award People's Artist of USSR Mikhail Tsarev	For successful comprehension of the profession actor		Won

== Interesting facts ==
- Miroslava partial to raw meat
- Miroslava hit the top of the sexiest women of Russia 2008
