= Polina Kutepova =

Soviet and Russian actress

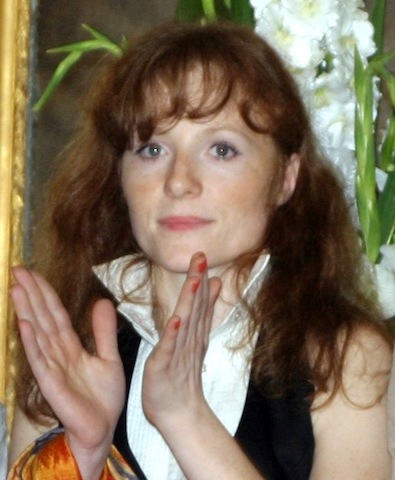
Polina Kutepova in 2004

Polina Pavlovna Kutepova (Russian: Поли́на Па́вловна Куте́пова; born August 1, 1971, Moscow) is a Soviet and Russian actress.

== Biography ==
Since childhood, Polina and her twin sister Kseniya were prepared for an artistic career. Polina studied at drama school and film school and starred in a movie. In 1993, she graduated from the acting group of GITIS (Pyotr Fomenko class). Since 1993, she has been an actress in Pyotr Fomenko's Workshop.

== Family ==
- Twin sister — Kseniya Kutepova
- Husband — Yevgeny Kamenkovich (1954), Soviet and Russian theater director
  - daughter — Nadezhda (1997)

== Awards ==
- Honored Artist of the Russian Federation (2004)
- Golden Mask 2010
