= Cheburashka (2023 film) =

- Theatrical release poster
- Russian: Cheburashka
- English: Chebi: My Fluffy Friend
- Directed by: Dmitry Dyachenko
- Written by: Vitaly Shlyappo; Vasily Kutsenko; Vyacheslav Zub; Anatoly Molchanov
- Based on: Cheburashka by Eduard Uspensky
- Produced by: Eduard Iloyan (ru); Denis Zhalinsky (ru); Vitaly Shlyappo (ru); Aleksey Trotsyuk (ru); Anton Zlatopolsky (ru); Yuliana Slashcheva; Lika Blank; Vadim Vereshchagin; Vyacheslav Murugov (ru); Mikhail Tkachenko; Anna Ryzhikova
- Starring: Olga Kuzmina; Sergei Garmash; Fyodor Dobronravov; Elena Yakovleva; Dmitry Lysenkov (ru); Polina Maksimova (ru); Sergei Lavygin (ru)
- Cinematography: Ivan Lebedev
- Edited by: Anton Anisimov; Kirill Abramov; Tim Pavelko; Dmitrii Smorchkov
- Music by: Ivan Kanaev
- Production companies: Yellow, Black and White; START Studio; Soyuzmultfilm; Russia-1; CTC Media; Cinema Fund
- Distributed by: Central Partnership
- Release date: January 1, 2023
- Running time: 113 minutes
- Country: Russia
- Languages: Russian; English (dubbed)
- Budget: ₽850 million; $12 million
- Box office: ₽7.045 billion; $94.508 million

Cheburashka, also in English territories titled as Chebi: My Fluffy Friend (Russian: Чебурашка) is a 2023 Russian live-action animated children's comedy film directed by Dmitry Dyachenko. The film is an adaptation of the 1960s Eduard Uspensky's children's book Gena the Crocodile and His Friends, and its Soviet animated adaptation about the characters Gena the Crocodile and Cheburashka. The film stars Olga Kuzmina as the titular character along with Sergei Garmash, Fyodor Dobronravov, and Elena Yakovleva. The production for the film began as early as 2020, with filming beginning in early 2021 at the Sochi Arboretum.

Cheburashka was theatrically released in Russia on January 1, 2023, by Central Partnership. The film grossed more than 225 million rubles on the first day of release, and 837 million rubles in the first three days. After fifteen days of release, the film had already earned over 4 billion rubles, making it the highest-grossing Russian film. It also became the first film to gross more than ₽5 billion.

Cheburashka received generally mixed to positive reviews from critics and audiences. Critics highly praised its visual effects, but criticized its predictable story. Following the film's success, Soyuzmultfilm signed a deal to produce a sequel, which was released on January 1, 2026.

== Plot ==
The film begins in an orange grove in Spain, where farmers are picking oranges. A mysterious, furry animal with large ears that loves to eat oranges appears and begins stealing them. Frustrated, the farmers set a trap with oranges as bait and successfully capture the creature. However, a sudden hurricane sweeps away all the oranges and the animal, while the farmers manage to escape.

Meanwhile, on the Black Sea coast of Russia, an elderly gardener named Gena works at the arboretum and struggles to mend his strained relationship with his daughter, Tanya. Tanya lives with her husband Tolya and their son Grisha in a small chocolate shop as they prepare for an annual festival. Gena's life becomes more difficult when he insults Rimma, the strict headmistress of the local chocolate factory, putting his job at risk.

After the hurricane, oranges begin falling throughout the city, and the furry animal finds its way to Gena's home. Mistaking Gena’s orange helmet for a giant orange, the animal causes chaos before Gena captures him. Initially resistant, Gena gradually warms up to the creature and decides to keep him, calling him a "Belarusian Shepherd Dog" when questioned by others.

During Grisha's birthday celebration, the animal’s presence amazes him and prompts him to speak for the first time. This newfound bond encourages Gena to teach the animal to speak and read, which helps repair his relationship with Tanya. However, trouble arises when Rimma's associate, Larion, steals Tanya's prized chocolate recipe book. Tanya and Tolya consider withdrawing from the festival, but Gena, with the help of his friend Valera, convinces Rimma to return the book in exchange for the animal, which Rimma’s granddaughter Sonya adores.

Though reluctant, Gena makes the exchange, recalling how he had to part with Tanya when she was young. Despite retrieving the book, Tanya resents Gena for giving up the animal. Determined to make amends, Gena and his friends – Valera, an ice cream vendor named Galya, and others – plan a rescue mission. They find out that Rimma and Sonya have taken the animal to the festival, where Rimma plans to launch a candy-filled rocket.

At night, Gena sneaks into a tent to apologize to the animal for abandoning him and shares memories of his late wife, Lyuba. The animal forgives him, and they plan to leave, but Grisha accidentally gets trapped inside the rocket set to launch. The animal heroically rescues Grisha by gliding down with him just before the rocket explodes.

The next day, Gena, his family, and friends celebrate the animal's birthday, where the animal reveals his new name, "Cheburashka," derived from the sound he makes when falling. Rimma, now remorseful and stripped of custody of Sonya, apologizes to Gena's family. Gena forgives her and invites her to join the celebration, where she plays a song on the harmonica.

In a post-credits scene, Gena and Cheburashka ride a motorcycle and are stopped by a policeman, who orders, "Take that off the wheel." Cheburashka responds indignantly, "I am not an 'it'!"

== Cast ==
=== Voice cast ===
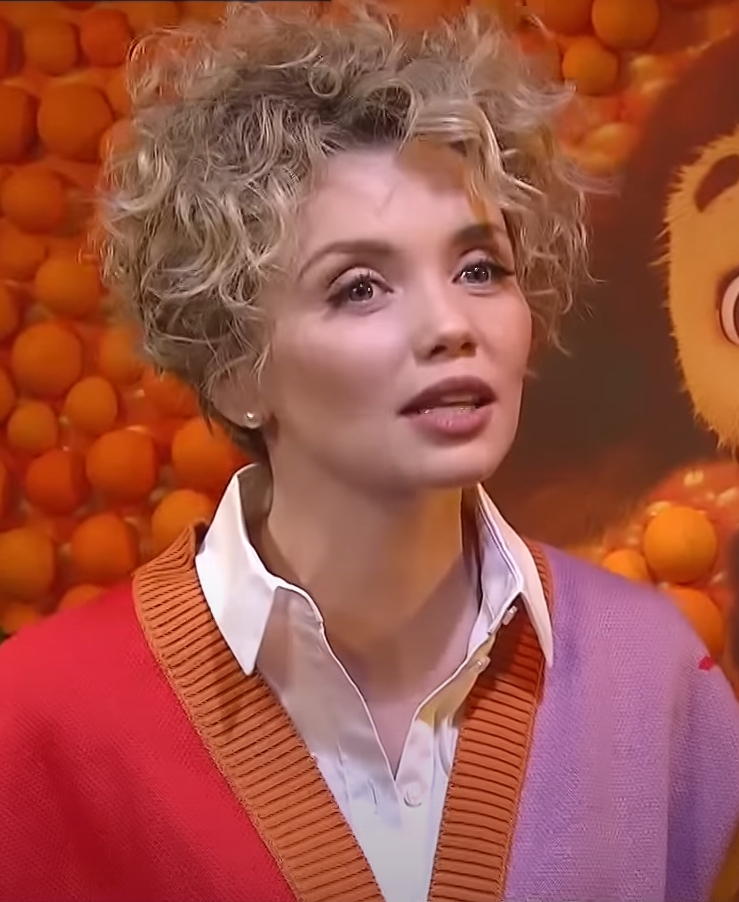
Olga Kuzmina, who voiced Cheburashka in the original Russian version.

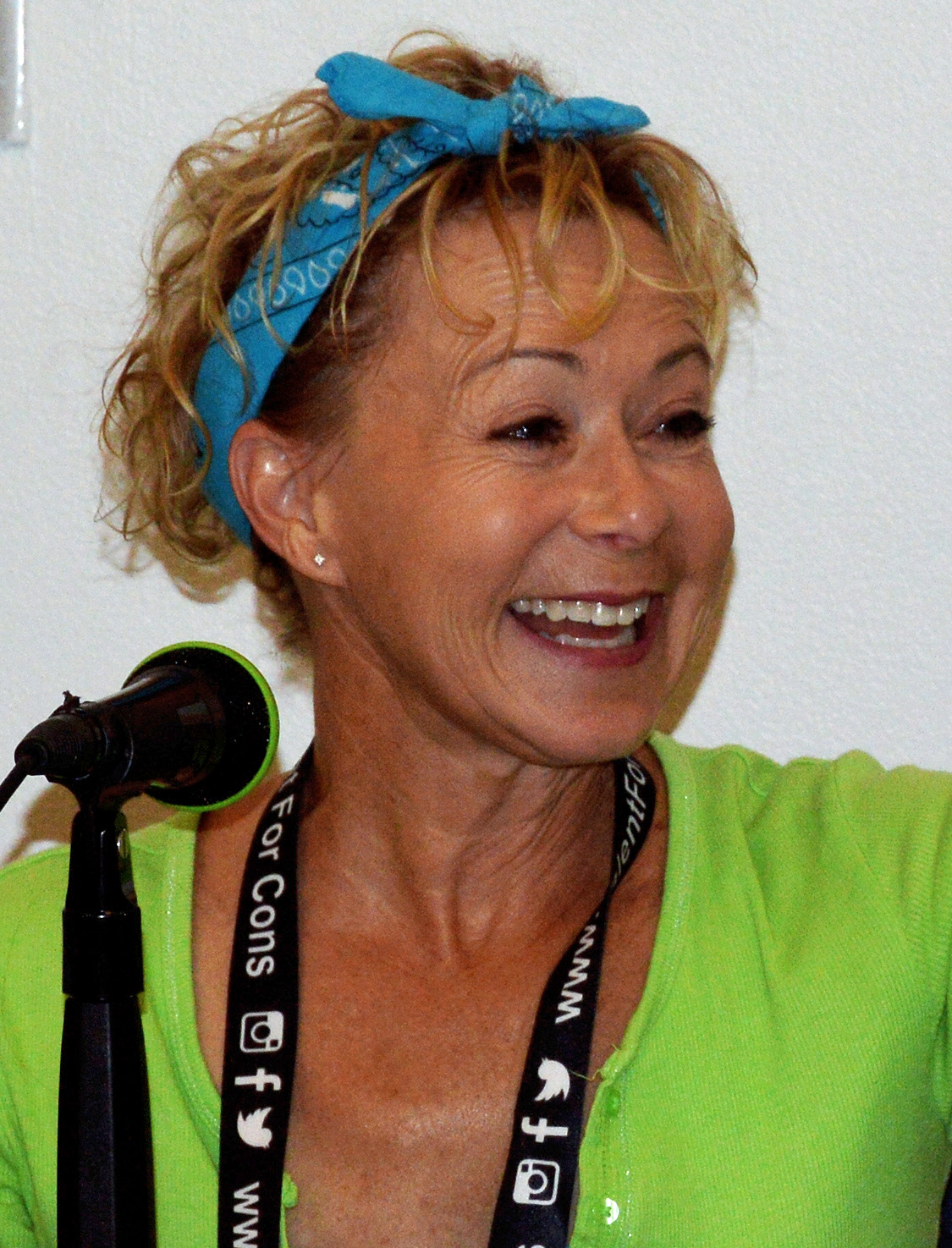
Debi Derryberry, who voiced Cheburashka (called Chebi) in the English dub.

- Olga Kuzmina as Cheburashka (voice)

Cheburashka is a big-eared animal that lives in an orange grove and ends up in a small town by the sea, where he meets an old man who is closed in himself, a boy who cannot speak, his mother and an unusual lady who wants to buy it and give it to her granddaughter, as well as a huge number of other characters.

=== Live-action cast ===
- Sergei Garmash as Gena, a gardener (counterpart to Gena the Crocodile)
  - Artyom Bystrov as Young Gena
- Fyodor Dobronravov as Valery "Valera" Zavgorodny, exotic animal specialist
- Elena Yakovleva as Rimma, director of the chocolate factory (counterpart to Old Lady Shapoklyak)
- Dmitry Lysenkov as Larion, Rimma's assistant (counterpart to Shapoklyak's pet rat Lariska)
- Eva Smirnova as Sonya, a little girl, Rimma's granddaughter
- Ilya Kondratenko as Grisha, mute boy
- Polina Maksimova as Tanya, Gena's daughter and Grisha's mother
  - Alisa Mynay as Tanya as a child
- Sergei Lavygin as Tolya, Grisha's father
- Sophia Zayka as Galya, an ice cream and drinks vendor
- Natalya Shchukina as Natalya (English: Natalia), director of the arboretum, Gena's boss
- Zhannat Kerimbaev as a street cleaner
- Olivier Siou as Rimma's French Chef
- Konstantin Fadeev as Vasily, Rimma's driver
- Marina Konyashkina as Lyuba, Gena's wife

=== English version ===
- Debi Derryberry as Chebi (voice)
- Michael Sorich as Gena (voice)
- Michael Orenstein as Valera (voice)
- Tara Sands as Rimma (voice)
- Daman Mills as Larion (voice)
- Casey Mongillo as Grisha (voice)
- Michelle Marie as Tanya (voice)
- Alejandro Saab as Tolya (voice)
- Heather Gonzalez as Natalia (voice)
- Bill Millsap as French Chef (voice)
- Brent Mukai as Caretaker (voice)

== Production ==
Dmitry Dyachenko directed the film. Yuliana Slashcheva is the chairman of the board of the Soyuzmultfilm film studio, and Eduard Iloyan is the general producer of Yellow, Black and White studio. They were engaged in the creation of the cartoon in tandem with the STS and Russia-1 channels. The start of filming was scheduled for 2021. The film adaptation is shared by both channels, but the premiere launch was expected on Russia-1. YBW is responsible for financing the project; according to preliminary data, production costs were to amount to at least 600 million rubles.

=== Post-production ===
The film contains a large amount of computer graphics. Cheburashka himself was created using motion capture technology. It was integrated into the film using the full CG blending method.

=== Filming ===
Principal photography of the film started in September 2021 in Sochi, Krasnodar Krai, using the Sochi Arboretum park, on the sea embankment and the Sanatorium named after G.K. Ordzhonikidze were used as locations.

The filmmakers moved to the cities of Pyatigorsk, Kislovodsk and Yessentuki, Stavropol Krai, and then to Moscow for field recordings. The creators specifically chose such places to create a sense of timelessness.

== Soundtrack ==
The soundtrack for this film is the song "Balloon", which was performed by the Russian band "My Michelle", and the songwriter is Tatyana Tkachuk. The song was released on digital platforms on January 1, 2023.

== Release ==
Cheburashka premiered on December 23, 2022 at the Karo October 11 cinema center in Moscow on New Arbat Avenue, and the wide release in the Russian Federation was for January 1, 2023 with the help of Central Partnership.

== Reception ==
=== Box office ===
The film earned back its initial budget of 850 million rubles in three days, subsequently becoming the highest-grossing film in the history of the Russian box office. On January 5, film screenings were attended by 1.2 million viewers, and the fees for that day amounted to 396.5 million rubles. As of January 6, 2023, the film's box office receipts amounted to more than 2 billion rubles, as the sixth film of domestic production that has overcome this threshold. The film is one of only 13 films to have passed the two billion ruble mark.

Cheburashka became the highest-grossing Russian film in the history of domestic distribution, having collected more than 3.09 billion rubles, and the highest-grossing film in the history of Russian film distribution, outperforming James Cameron's Avatar. The amount of fees exceeded 4 billion rubles. During the month of January, the film was watched by over 20 million Russians, and the fees exceeded 6 billion rubles.

The film's total box office receipts amounted to $95.7 million, including $82.7 million in its first month of release. The number of tickets sold reached 22.4 million.

== Sequels ==
Sergei Garmash added that he can't reveal anything more about the second part of the film at this time, as it's still in development. Filming for the second Cheburashka has been underway at the Sochi Arboretum since September 11, 2023. On September 22, 2023, it was announced that Cheburashka 2 would be released on January 1, 2026.
