= Cheburashka 2 =

- Theatrical release poster
- Directed by: Dmitry Dyachenko
- Written by: Vitaly Shlyappo; Vasily Kutsenko; Vyacheslav Zub; Anatoly Molchanov
- Based on: Cheburashka by Eduard Uspensky
- Produced by: Eduard Iloyan (ru); Denis Zhalinsky (ru); Vitaly Shlyappo (ru); Anton Zlatopolsky (ru); Yuliana Slashcheva; Mikhail Tkachenko; Sergey Chibisov; Irina Vintovkina; Vasily Kutsenko; Ekaterina Dodonova
- Starring: Olga Kuzmina; Sergei Garmash; Fyodor Dobronravov; Elena Yakovleva; Dmitry Lysenkov (ru); Polina Maksimova (ru); Sergei Lavygin (ru)
- Cinematography: Ivan Lebedev
- Production companies: Yellow, Black and White; START Studio; Soyuzmultfilm; Russia-1; CTC Media; Cinema Fund
- Distributed by: Central Partnership
- Release date: January 1, 2026 (Russia)
- Running time: 103 minutes
- Country: Russia
- Language: Russian
- Budget: ₽1.4 billion $19.8 million
- Box office: ₽6 billion; $82,156,152

Cheburashka 2, also known as Chebi: My Fluffy Friend 2 (Russian: Чебурашка 2) is a 2026 Russian live-action animated children's comedy film directed by Dmitry Dyachenko, and produced by Eduard Iloyan, Denis Zhalinsky, Vitaly Shlyappo, Anton Zlatopolsky, and Yuliana Slashcheva. It also serves as the second installment in the Cheburashka franchise and a sequel to the 2023 film Cheburashka.

The film follows the continuing adventures of the fairytale hero Cheburashka. He remains friends with Gena, but one day, a year after the events depicted in the first film, their peaceful life is disrupted by an unexpected event (the creators don't specify what it is until later). The film's action is intended to be more ambitious.

In the film Cheburashka 2 the main cast of the first part returned to their roles: Olga Kuzmina, Sergei Garmash, Fyodor Dobronravov, Elena Yakovleva, Dmitry Lysenkov, Polina Maksimova, and Sergei Lavygin. Principal photography for the previous part of Cheburashka 2 began in May 2024 on the Central Embankment, the Sochi Arboretum park, and the Sanatorium named after G.K. Ordzhonikidze in Sochi, as well as in the cities of Kislovodsk, Pyatigorsk and Yessentuki, Stavropol Krai, and Moscow.

Cheburashka 2 was theatrically released in Russia on January 1, 2026, by Central Partnership. The film has grossed $78.9 million worldwide, making it the highest-grossing film in Russia of all time.

== Plot ==
Cheburashka lives with Gena, grows up, and they begin to have disagreements. Cheburashka shows independence and misbehaves, while Gena plays the role of a mentor. And suddenly, they learn that someone is planning to demolish their house.

== Cast ==
=== Voice cast ===
- Olga Kuzmina as Cheburashka

=== Live-action cast ===
- Sergei Garmash as Gena, a gardener, and Cheburashka's guardian (counterpart to Gena the Crocodile)
  - Artyom Bystrov as Young Gena
- Fyodor Dobronravov as Valery "Valera" Zavgorodny, an exotic animal specialist, and Gena's friend
  - Viktor Dobronravov as Young Valera
- Elena Yakovleva as Rimma, the factory owner, and Sonya's grandmother (counterpart to Old Lady Shapoklyak)
- Dmitry Lysenkov as Larion, Rimma's assistant (counterpart to Shapoklyak's pet rat Lariska)
  - Sergei Staykin as the Boy Larion
- Eva Smirnova as Sonya, Rimma's granddaughter
- Ilya Kondratenko as Grisha, Gena's grandson
- Polina Maksimova as Tanya, Gena's daughter and Grisha's mother
- Sergei Lavygin as Tolya, Grisha's father
- Sophia Zayka as Galya, a saleswoman
- Natalya Shchukina as Natalya (English: Natalia), director of the arboretum, Gena's boss
- Zhannat Kerimbaev as a janitor, Gena's friend
- Olivier Siou as Rimma's French Chef
- Marina Konyashkina as Lyuba, Gena's wife
- Aleksandr Lykov as the Hunter, Larion's father
  - Matvey Lykov as the Young Hunter

== Production ==
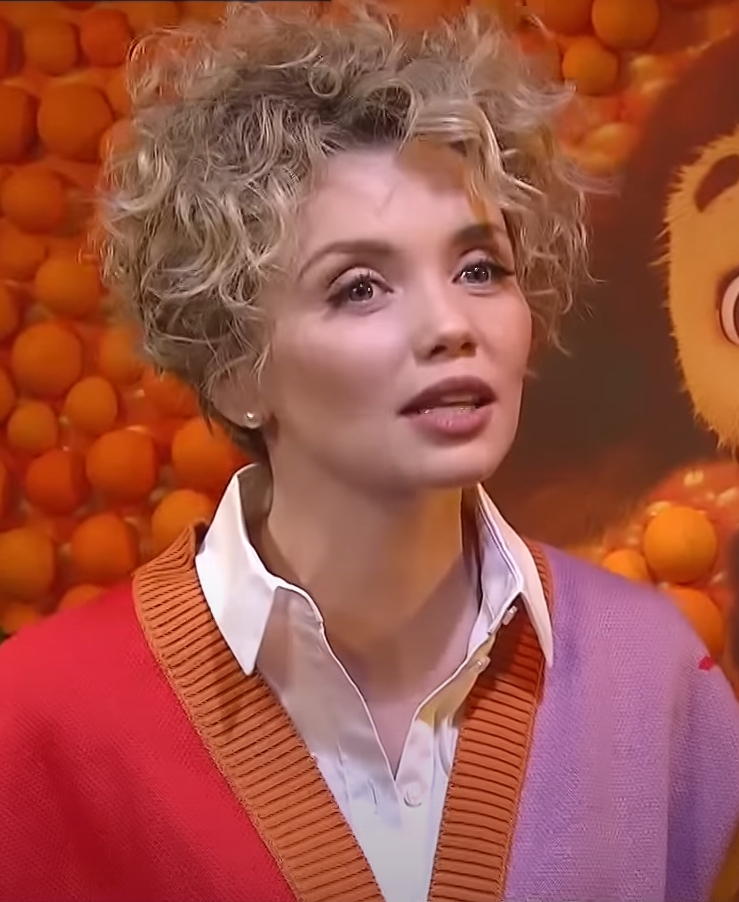
Olga Kuzmina (pictured in 2023) reprised her role as Cheburashka for the sequel.

Work on the film's sequel began in 2023, following the resounding success of Cheburashka. Dmitry Dyachenko returned as director, and Sergei Garmash returned to the role of Gena. This is a joint project of the film companies Yellow, Black and White, START Studio, Soyuzmultfilm, and Russia-1, work on the film was carried out with the support of the Cinema Fund.

=== Filming ===
The main filming phase lasted from June 3 to November 22, 2024. Filming again took place at the Sochi Arboretum and other scenic locations in the city. Filming began in Moscow in early June 2024. Some scenes were shot in the mountains to create the large-scale landscapes for the adventure portion of the story. As in the first film, a combination of live action, computer graphics (CG), and motion capture technology was used to create the character of Cheburashka. The same team that worked on the original film was responsible for the visual component.

== Release ==
In September 2023, it was announced that Cheburashka 2 would be released theatrically on January 1, 2026, but this was later moved forward to December 2025. Following the release of the short film Cheburashka. Day Off, the December release date was reaffirmed.

On March 21, 2024, Sergei Garmash announced that filming for Cheburashka 2 and Cheburashka 3 would begin in early June 2025. Soon after, on March 25, 2024, the release date was moved back to January 1, 2026.

=== Theatrical ===
Cheburashka 2 premiered on December 24, 2025 at the KARO 11 October cinema center on New Arbat Avenue in Moscow. Its wide release in the Russian Federation occurred on January 1, 2026 with Central Partnership handling distribution. The film was also released in various Russian-speaking CIS markets, such as Kazakhstan and Moldova. It also received a limited release in the United States on January 24th of the same year.

== Reception ==
On the first day of its release, Cheburashka 2 grossed 507 million rubles ($6.70 million), becoming the highest-grossing opening day in Russian film in history.

=== Critical response ===
Cheburashka 2 received more positive critical reviews than the original film, who praised the acting and the script, but complained about the film's humour.
