= List of highest-grossing live-action/animated films =

The following is a list of the highest-grossing live-action animated films, films that combine live-action and animation characters. Films are only included their principal characters are animated in a live-action environment, or if their presence occupies a substantial part of the runtime. Otherwise, the majority of live-action films which use computer-animated visual effects would be included.

== Highest-grossing live-action/animated films ==
All of the films have had a theatrical run (including re-releases) since 1980, and films that have not played since then do not appear on the chart due to ticket-price inflation, population size and ticket purchasing trends not being considered.

2021 is the most represented year on the list, with four films listed.

† Background shading indicates films playing in the week commencing 13 November 2026 in theaters around the world.

Highest-grossing live-action/animated films
Rank	Title	Worldwide gross	Year	Ref
1	Lilo & Stitch	$1,038,027,526	2025	
2	How to Train Your Dragon	$636,558,650	2025	
3	The Smurfs	$563,749,323	2011	
4	Ted	$549,368,315	2012	
5	Sonic the Hedgehog 3	$491,603,986	2024	
6	Teenage Mutant Ninja Turtles	$485,004,754	2014	
7	Alvin and the Chipmunks: The Squeakquel	$443,140,005	2009	
8	Pokémon Detective Pikachu	$433,230,304	2019	
9	Sonic the Hedgehog 2	$402,656,846	2022	
10	Alvin and the Chipmunks	$365,352,546	2007	
11	Who Framed Roger Rabbit	$351,500,000	1988	
12	Peter Rabbit	$351,266,433	2018	
13	Mary Poppins Returns	$349,537,494	2018	
14	The Smurfs 2	$347,545,360	2013	
15	Alvin and the Chipmunks: Chipwrecked	$342,695,435	2011	
16	Enchanted	$340,487,652	2007	
17	Sonic the Hedgehog	$319,766,470	2020	
18	Stuart Little	$300,135,367	1999	
19	G-Force	$292,817,841	2009	
20	Casper	$287,928,194	1995	
21	Paddington	$282,370,135	2014	
22	Scooby-Doo	$275,650,703	2002	
23	Dolittle	$251,509,294	2020	
24	Space Jam	$250,180,384	1996	
25	Teenage Mutant Ninja Turtles: Out of the Shadows	$245,623,848	2016	
26	Alvin and the Chipmunks: The Road Chip	$234,798,636	2015	
27	Paddington 2	$227,978,523	2017	
28	Ted 2	$215,863,606	2015	
29	Yogi Bear	$203,509,374	2010	
30	Garfield: The Movie	$203,172,417	2004	
31	Christopher Robin	$197,744,377	2018	
32	The BFG	$195,243,411	2016	
33	Paddington in Peru	$192,148,490	2024	
34	IF	$190,309,707	2024	
35	Scooby-Doo 2: Monsters Unleashed	$181,216,833	2004	
36	Hop	$183,953,723	2011	
37	Stuart Little 2	$169,956,806	2002	
38	Space Jam: A New Legacy	$163,692,228	2021	
39	Peter Rabbit 2: The Runaway	$153,901,717	2021	
40	Charlotte's Web	$148,963,822	2006	
41	Pete's Dragon	$143,695,338	2016	
42	Garfield: A Tail of Two Kitties	$143,325,970	2006	
43	Tom & Jerry	$136,536,687	2021	
44	Walking with Dinosaurs	$126,546,518	2013	
45	Coyote vs. Acme †	$126,000,000	2026	
46	Dora and the Lost City of Gold	$120,597,108	2019	
47	Lyle, Lyle, Crocodile	$110,972,933	2022	
48	Arthur and the Invisibles	$107,944,236	2006	
49	Clifford the Big Red Dog	$107,347,356	2021	
50	Mary Poppins	$103,078,700	1964	|-

=== Live action/computer animation ===
All of the films have had a theatrical run (including re-releases) since 1995, and films that have not played since then do not appear on the chart due to ticket-price inflation, population size and ticket purchasing trends not being considered. 2009 is the most frequent year with four films on the list while Alvin and the Chipmunks is the most frequent franchise with four films on the list.

† Background shading indicates films playing in the week commencing 13 November 2026 in theaters around the world.

Highest-grossing live-action animated films
Rank	Title	Worldwide gross	Year	Ref
1	Lilo & Stitch	$1,038,027,526	2025	
2	How to Train Your Dragon	$636,558,650	2025	
3	The Smurfs	$563,749,323	2011	
4	Ted	$549,368,315	2012	
5	Sonic the Hedgehog 3	$491,603,986	2024	
6	Teenage Mutant Ninja Turtles	$485,004,754	2014	
7	Alvin and the Chipmunks: The Squeakquel	$443,140,005	2009	
8	Pokémon Detective Pikachu	$433,230,304	2019	
9	Sonic the Hedgehog 2	$402,656,846	2022	
10	Alvin and the Chipmunks	$365,352,546	2007	
11	Peter Rabbit	$351,266,433	2018	
12	The Smurfs 2	$347,545,360	2013	
13	Alvin and the Chipmunks: Chipwrecked	$342,695,435	2011	
14	Sonic the Hedgehog	$319,715,683	2020	
15	Stuart Little	$300,135,367	1999	
16	G-Force	$292,817,841	2009	
17	Casper	$287,928,194	1995	
18	Paddington	$282,370,135	2014	
19	Scooby-Doo	$275,650,703	2002	
20	Dolittle	$251,509,294	2020	
21	Teenage Mutant Ninja Turtles: Out of the Shadows	$245,623,848	2016	
22	Alvin and the Chipmunks: The Road Chip	$234,798,636	2015	
23	Paddington 2	$227,978,523	2017	
24	Ted 2	$215,863,606	2015	
25	Yogi Bear	$203,509,374	2010	
26	Garfield: The Movie	$203,172,417	2004	
27	Christopher Robin	$197,744,377	2018	
28	The BFG	$195,243,411	2016	
29	Paddington in Peru	$192,148,490	2024	
30	IF	$190,309,707	2024	
31	Hop	$183,953,723	2011	
32	Scooby-Doo 2: Monsters Unleashed	$181,216,833	2004	
33	Stuart Little 2	$169,956,806	2002	
34	Space Jam: A New Legacy	$163,692,228	2021	
35	Peter Rabbit 2: The Runaway	$153,901,717	2021	
36	Charlotte's Web	$148,963,822	2006	
37	Pete's Dragon	$143,695,338	2016	
38	Garfield: A Tail of Two Kitties	$143,325,970	2006	
39	Tom & Jerry	$136,536,687	2021	
40	Walking with Dinosaurs	$126,546,518	2013	
41	Coyote vs. Acme †	$126,000,000	2026	
42	Dora and the Lost City of Gold	$120,597,108	2019	
43	Lyle, Lyle, Crocodile	$110,972,933	2022	
44	Arthur and the Invisibles	$107,944,236	2006	
45	Clifford the Big Red Dog	$107,347,356	2021	
46	Cheburashka	$90,787,877	2023	
47	Small Soldiers	$87,500,000	1998	
48	Gabby's Dollhouse: The Movie	$80,812,764	2025	
49	Cheburashka 2	$79,559,272	2026	
50	Arthur and the Revenge of Maltazard	$78,520,547	2009	

=== Live action/traditional animation ===
All of the films have had a theatrical run (including re-releases) since 1980, and films that have not played since then do not appear on the chart due to ticket-price inflation, population size and ticket purchasing trends not being considered. Looney Tunes is the most represented franchise with 4 films on the list (5 if Who Framed Roger Rabbit is included).

Highest-grossing live-action animated films
Rank	Title	Worldwide gross	Year	Ref
1	Who Framed Roger Rabbit	$351,500,000	1988	
2	Mary Poppins Returns	$349,537,494	2018	
3	Enchanted	$340,487,652	2007	
4	Space Jam	$250,180,384	1996	
5	Space Jam: A New Legacy	$162,892,228	2021	
6	Coyote vs. ACME	$126,000,000	2026	
7	Mary Poppins	$103,078,700	1964	
8	Looney Tunes: Back in Action	$68,514,844	2003	
9	Song of the South	$65,000,000	1946	
10	Fat Albert (film)	$48,600,000	2004	
11	Pete's Dragon	$39,588,000	1977	
12	Harold and the Purple Crayon	$32,227,291	2024	
13	Bedknobs and Broomsticks	$26,100,000	1971	
14	Cool World	$14,110,589	1992	
15	Osmosis Jones	$14,026,418	2001	
16	The Pagemaster	$13,670,688	1994	

== Timeline ==
The following is a timeline of the highest grossing live action animated films since 1966. Disney have held the record three times. The Alvin and the Chipmunks film series is the only franchise to hold the record on more than one occasion, doing so two times. Mary Poppins hold the record for the longest with 22 years.

Title	Established	Record-setting gross	Ref
Mary Poppins	1966	$88,272,727	
Mary Poppins	1980	$102,272,727	
Who Framed Roger Rabbit	1988	$351,500,000	
Alvin and the Chipmunks	2008	$361,336,633	
Alvin and the Chipmunks: The Squeakquel	2010	$443,140,005	
The Smurfs	2011	$563,749,323	
Lilo & Stitch	2025	$1,038,027,526	

=== Live action/computer animation ===
Title	Established	Record-setting gross	Ref
Stuart Little	1999	$300,135,367	
Alvin and the Chipmunks	2008	$361,336,633	
Alvin and the Chipmunks: The Squeakquel	2010	$443,140,005	
The Smurfs	2011	$563,749,323	
Lilo & Stitch	2025	$1,038,027,526	

=== Live action/traditional animation ===
Title	Established	Record-setting gross	Ref
Mary Poppins	1966	$88,272,727	
Mary Poppins	1980	$103,078,700	
Who Framed Roger Rabbit	1988	$351,500,000	

=== Opening weekend ===
The following is a timeline of the highest opening weekend live action animated films since 1986.

Title	Established	Record-setting gross	Ref
Song of The South	1986	$4,203,111*	
Who Framed Roger Rabbit	1988	$11,226,239*	
Casper	1995	$16,840,385*	
Space Jam	1996	$27,528,529*	
Scooby-Doo	2002	$54,155,312*	
Alvin and the Chipmunks: The Squeakquel	2009	$72,362,847	
Detective Pikachu	2019	$161,000,000	
Lilo & Stitch	2025	$341,000,000	

== Highest-grossing films by year ==
The following is the highest grossing live action animated films by year. All films in The Smurfs, Teenage Mutant Ninja Turtles and Sonic the Hedgehog are on the list.

whiles Looney Tunes , Alvin and the chipmunks and Sonic the Hedgehog are the most frequent franchises with 3 films esch.

Live action traditional animation films top the year in 1946, 1964,1971, 1977, 1988, 1992, 1994 and 1996 live action computer animated top every other year.

Highest-grossing films by year of release
Year	Title	Worldwide gross	Budget	Ref
1946	Song of the South	$65,000,000	$2,125,000	
1947-1963				
1964	Mary Poppins	$103,128,981 ($31,008,625)	$4,400,000-$4,600,000	
1965-1970				
1971	Bedknobs and Broomsticks	$17,871,174	$6,300,000	
1972-1976				
1977	Pete's Dragon	$39,588,000 ($35,488,000)	$10,000,000	
1978-1988				
1988	Who Framed Roger Rabbit	$329,803,958	$50,000,000	(Note: The budget has been commonly reported as $70 million, including by The New York Times in 1991, which subsequently issued an erratum to state that both Amblin and Touchstone insist the budget was "about $50 million". Publications of the film's accounts since then indicate that the exact production cost of the film was $58,166,000, including the production overhead which came to a total of $7,587,000, putting the net cost at $50,587,000.)
1989-1991				
1992	Cool World	$14,110,589	$28,000,000	
1993				
1994	The Pagemaster	$13,670,688	$34,000,000	
1995	Casper	$290,277,077		
1996	Space Jam	$230,594,962	$80,000,000	
1997				
1998	Small Soldiers	$87,500,000	$40,000,000	
1999	Stuart Little	$300,135,367	$133,000,000	
2000	The Adventures of Rocky & Bullwinkle	$35,134,820	$76,000,000	
2001	Osmosis Jones	$14,026,418		
2002	Scooby-doo	$275,650,703	$84,000,000	
2003	Looney Tunes: Back in Action	$68,514,844	$80,000,000	
2004	Garfield: The Movie	$203,172,417	$50,000,000	
2005				
2006	Charlotte's Web	$148,965,304	$85,000,000	
2007	Alvin and the Chipmunks	$365,352,546	$60,000,000	
2008				
2009	Alvin and the Chipmunks: The Squeakquel	$443,140,005	$75,000,000	
2010	Yogi Bear	$203,509,374	$80,000,000	
2011	The Smurfs	$563,892,376	$110,000,000	
2012	Ted	$549,368,315	$50,000,000	
2013	The Smurfs 2	$347,545,360	$105,000,000	
2014	Teenage Mutant Ninja Turtles	$485,004,754	$125,000,000-$150,000,000	
2015	Alvin and the Chipmunks: The Road Chip	$234,798,636	$90,000,000	
2016	Teenage Mutant Ninja Turtles: Out of the Shadows	$245,623,848	$135,000,000	
2017	Paddington 2	$227,291,591	$40,000,000	
2018	Peter Rabbit	$351,516,614	$50,000,000	
2019	Detective Pikachu	$451,453,444	$150,000,000	
2020	Sonic the Hedgehog	$319,715,683	$85,000,000	
2021	Space Jam: A New Legacy	$163,692,228	$150,000,000	
2022	Sonic the Hedgehog 2	$405,421,518	$90,000,000-$110,000,000	
2023	Cheburashka	$90,787,877		
2024	Sonic the Hedgehog 3	$492,162,604	$122,000,000	
2025	Lilo & stitch	$1,038,027,526	$100,000,000	
2026	Coyote vs. Acme †	$126,000,000	$70,000,000-$72,000,000	</ref>

== Highest-grossing live-action animated film franchises and series ==
The following chart is a list of the highest-grossing live-action animated film franchises. The Alvin and the Chipmunks franchise is the most successful, with worldwide box office totals of nearly $1.4 billion. A given franchise needs to have at least 2 theatrically released films to be on this list. The The Smurfs franchise has the highest per-film average, with nearly $455.7 million per film.

† Background shading indicates that at least one film in the series is playing in the week commencing 13 November 2026 in theaters around the world.

Highest-grossing live-action animated franchises and film series^{[§]} (The films in each franchise can be viewed by selecting "show")

Rank	Series	Total worldwide box office	No. of films	Average of films	Highest-grossing film

1	Alvin and the Chipmunks	$1,385,986,622	4	$346,496,656	Alvin and the Chipmunks: The Squeakquel ($443,140,005)
1	The Squeakquel (2009)	$443,140,005			
2	Alvin and the Chipmunks (2007)	$365,352,546			
3	Chipwrecked (2011)	$342,695,435			
4	The Road Chip (2015)	$234,798,636			

2	Sonic the Hedgehog	$1,213,976,515	3	$404,658,838	Sonic the Hedgehog 3 ($491,603,986)
1	Sonic the Hedgehog 3 (2024)	$491,603,986			
2	Sonic the Hedgehog 2 (2022)	$402,656,846			
3	Sonic the Hedgehog (2020)	$319,715,683			

3	The Smurfs	$911,294,683	2	$455,647,342	The Smurfs ($563,749,323)
1	The Smurfs (2011)	$563,749,323			
2	The Smurfs 2 (2013)	$347,545,360			

4	Ted	$765,231,921	2	$382,615,961	Ted ($549,368,315)
1	Ted (2012)	$549,368,315			
2	Ted 2 (2015)	$215,863,606			

5	Teenage Mutant Ninja Turtles	$730,628,602	2	$365,314,301	Teenage Mutant Ninja Turtles ($485,004,754)
1	Teenage Mutant Ninja Turtles (2014)	$485,004,754			
2	Out of the Shadows (2016)	$245,623,848			

6	Paddington	$700,806,183	3	$233,602,061	Paddington ($282,370,135)
1	Paddington (2014)	$282,370,135			
2	Paddington 2 (2017)	$227,978,523			
3	In Peru (2024)	$190,457,525			

7	Looney Tunes †	$608,387,456	4	$152,096,864	Space Jam ($250,180,384)
/ Space Jam series / $413,872,612 / 2 / $206,936,306 / Space Jam ($250,180,384); 1 / Space Jam (1996) / $250,180,384; 2 / A New Legacy (2021) / $163,692,228
Coyote vs. Acme (2026) † / $126,000,000
Back in Action (2003) / $68,514,844

8	Peter Rabbit	$505,397,783	2	$252,698,892	Peter Rabbit ($351,496,066)
1	Peter Rabbit (2018)	$351,496,066			
2	The Runaway (2021)	$153,901,717			

9	Stuart Little	$470,092,173	2	$235,046,087	Stuart Little ($300,135,367)
1	Stuart Little (1999)	$300,135,367			
2	Stuart Little 2 (2002)	$169,956,806			

10	Scooby-Doo	$457,117,536	2	$228,558,768	Scooby Doo ($275,650,703)
1	Scooby Doo (2002)	$275,650,703			
2	Monsters Unleashed (2004)	$181,466,833			

11	Mary Poppins	$452,616,194	2	$226,308,097	Mary Poppins Returns ($349,537,494)
1	Mary Poppins Returns (2018)	$349,537,494			
2	Mary Poppins (1964)	$103,078,700			

12	Garfield	$346,498,387	2	$173,249,194	Garfield ($203,172,417)
1	Garfield: The Movie (2004)	$203,172,417			
2	A Tail of Two Kitties (2006)	$143,325,970			

13	Arthur	$217,163,702	3	$72,387,901	The Invisibles ($107,944,236)
1	The Invisibles (2006)	$107,944,236			
2	The Revenge of Maltazard (2009)	$78,520,547			
3	The War of the Two Worlds (2010)	$30,698,919			

14	Pete's Dragon	$183,283,338	2	$91,641,669	Pete's Dragon (2016) ($143,695,338)
1	Pete's Dragon (2016)	$143,695,338			
2	Pete's Dragon (1977)	$39,588,000			

15	Cheburashka	$170,347,149	2	$85,173,575	Cheburashka ($90,787,877)
1	Cheburashka (2023)	$90,787,877			
2	Cheburashka 2 (2026)	$79,559,272			

== Live action/animated films by number of box office admissions ==
The following table lists known estimated box office ticket sales for various high-grossing live action animated films that have sold more than 1 million tickets worldwide.

Note that some of the data are incomplete due to a lack of available admissions data from a number of countries. Therefore, it is not an exhaustive list of all the highest-grossing video game films by ticket sales, so no rankings are given.

Title	Year	Ticket sales (est.)	Ref
Mary Poppins	1964	105,507,268	(Note: Mary Poppins admissions: United States and Canada – 78,181,800; United Kingdom – 14 million; France, Germany, Spain – 13,325,468)
Pokémon: Detective Pikachu	2019	66,600,000	(Note: Detective Pikachu admissions: United States and Canada – 15,993,900; Japan – 2,120,000; China – 18,209,492; Europe – 12,026,023; Mexico – 4,500,000; South Korea – 686,809)
Sonic the Hedgehog 3	2024	46,600,000	
Sonic the Hedgehog 2	2022	44,800,000	
Sonic the Hedgehog	2020	41,078,604	(Note: Sonic the Hedgehog admissions: United States and Canada – 15,876,790; Europe – 12,454,206; Mexico, Peru, Ecuador, Dominican Republic – 8,241,240; Brazil – 3,001,403; China – 698,500; Argentina – 687,740; South Korea – 118,725)
Space Jam	1996	35,831,667	
Space Jam: A New Legacy	2021	18,700,000	

== Opening weekends ==
The following is a list of live action/animated films with the biggest opening weekend.

Rank	Film	Year	Opening weekend	Ref
1	Lilo & Stitch	2025	$341,000,000	
2	Detective Pikachu	2019	$161,000,000	
3	Sonic the Hedgehog	2020	$101,000,000	
4	Teenage Mutant Ninja Turtles	2014	$90,287,427	
5	Alvin and the Chipmunks: The Squeakquel	2009	$72,362,847	
6	Sonic the Hedgehog 2	2022	$72,105,176*	
7	Sonic the Hedgehog 3	2024	$60,102,146*	
8	Scooby-Doo	2002	$54,155,312*	
9	The Smurfs 2	2013	$48,603,689	
10	IF	2024	$50,434,359	
11	Mary Poppins Returns	2018	$45,616,929	
12	Alvin and the Chipmunks	2007	$44,307,417	
13	Enchanted	2007	$42,204,913*	
14	Clifford the Big Red Dog	2021	$38,385,323	
15	Alvin and the Chipmunks: Chipwrecked	2011	$36,563,364	
16	Ted 2	2015	$33,507,870*	
17	Teenage Mutant Ninja Turtles: Out of the Shadows	2016	$33,000,000	
18	G-Force	2009	$32,229,662	
19	Christopher Robin	2018	$32,224,808	
20	Cheburashka 2	2026	$30,444,155	
21	Scooby-Doo 2: Monsters Unleashed	2004	$29,438,331	
22	Space Jam	1996	$27,528,529*	
23	Pete's Dragon	2016	$26,649,485	
24	Peter Rabbit	2018	$25,012,113	
25	Coyote vs. Acme	2026	$23,900,000	
26	Garfield: The Movie	2004	$21,727,611*	
27	Dora and the Lost City of Gold	2019	$18,543,411	
28	Stuart Little 2	2002	$18,123,791	
29	Casper	1995	$16,840,385*	
30	Yogi Bear	2010	$16,411,322	
31	Stuart Little	1999	$15,018,223*	
32	Walking with Dinosaurs	2013	$14,638,905	
33	Alvin and the Chipmunks: The Road Chip	2015	$14,287,159*	
34	Paddington in Peru	2024	$12,467,357^	
35	Paddington 2	2017	$12,303,191	
36	Lyle, Lyle, Crocodile	2022	$11,552,393	
37	Who Framed Roger Rabbit	1988	$11,226,239*	
38	Houba! On the Trail of the Marsupilami	2012	$11,220,912	
39	Looney Tunes: Back in Action	2003	$9,317,371*	
40	Paddington	2014	$8,025,427^	
41	Garfield: A Tail of Two Kitties	2006	$7,288,977*	
42	The Adventures of Rocky and Bullwinkle	2000	$6,814,270*	
43	Cool World	1992	$5,556,451*	
44	Osmosis Jones	2001	$5,271,248*	
45	The BFG	2016	$4,210,860	
46	Song of the South (Note: 1986 reissue)	1986	$4,203,111*	
47	Monster Trucks	2016	$2,130,884^	
48	Peter Rabbit 2: The Runaway	2021	$2,064,490!	
49	Woody Woodpecker	2017	$1,503,181’	

- = North America only
^ = United Kingdom only.
! = Austria only.
’= Brazil only

=== Opening weekends for Live action/traditional animation films ===
The following is a list of live action/animated movies which have opened to more than $1 million.

Rank	Film	Year	Opening weekend	Ref
1	Mary Poppins Returns	2018	$45,616,929	
2	Enchanted	2007	$42,204,913*	
3	Space Jam	1996	$27,528,529*	
4	Who Framed Roger Rabbit	1988	$11,226,239*	
5	Looney Tunes: Back in Action	2003	$9,317,371*	
6	Cool World	1992	$5,556,451*	
7	Osmosis Jones	2001	$5,271,248*	
8	Song of the South (Note: 1986 reissue)	1986	$4,203,111*	

=== Opening weekends for Live action/computer animation ===
The following is a list of Live action/computer animation movies which have opened to more than $1 million.

Rank	Film	Year	Opening weekend	Ref
1	Lilo & Stitch	2025	$341,000,000	
2	Detective Pikachu	2019	$161,000,000	
3	Sonic the Hedgehog	2020	$101,000,000	
4	Teenage Mutant Ninja Turtles	2014	$90,287,427	
5	Alvin and the Chipmunks: The Squeakquel	2009	$72,362,847	
6	Sonic the Hedgehog 2	2022	$72,105,176*	
7	Sonic the Hedgehog 3	2024	$60,102,146*	
8	Scooby-Doo	2002	$54,155,312*	
9	IF	2024	$50,434,359	
10	The Smurfs 2	2013	$48,603,689	
11	Alvin and the Chipmunks	2007	$44,307,417	
12	Alvin and the Chipmunks: Chipwrecked	2011	$36,563,364	
13	Ted 2	2015	$33,507,870*	
14	Teenage Mutant Ninja Turtles: Out of the Shadows	2016	$33,000,000	
15	G-Force	2009	$32,229,662	
16	Christopher Robin	2018	$32,224,808	
17	Cheburashka 2	2026	$30,444,155	
18	Scooby-Doo 2: Monsters Unleashed	2004	$29,438,331	
19	Pete's Dragon	2016	$26,649,485	
20	Peter Rabbit	2018	$25,012,113	
21	Coyote vs. Acme	2026	$23,900,000	
22	Garfield: The Movie	2004	$21,727,611*	
23	Dora and the Lost City of Gold	2019	$18,543,411	
24	Stuart Little 2	2002	$18,123,791	
25	Casper	1995	$16,840,385*	
26	Yogi Bear	2010	$16,411,322	
27	Stuart Little	1999	$15,018,223*	
28	Walking with Dinosaurs	2013	$14,638,905	
29	Alvin and the Chipmunks: The Road Chip	2015	$14,287,159*	
30	Paddington in Peru	2024	$12,467,357^	
31	Paddington 2	2017	$12,303,191	
32	Lyle, Lyle, Crocodile	2022	$11,552,393	
33	Houba! On the Trail of the Marsupilami	2012	$11,220,912	
34	Paddington	2014	$8,025,427^	
35	Garfield: A Tail of Two Kitties	2006	$7,288,977*	
36	The Adventures of Rocky and Bullwinkle	2000	$6,814,270*	
37	The BFG	2016	$4,210,860	
38	Monster Trucks	2016	$2,130,884^	
39	Peter Rabbit 2: The Runaway	2021	$2,064,490!	
40	Woody Woodpecker	2017	$1,503,181’	
41	Arthur and the Invisibles	2006	$1,106,429	
42	Tom & Jerry	2021	$1,104,315	

- = North America only
^ = United Kingdom only.
! = Austria only.
’= Brazil only

== See also ==
- List of highest-grossing animated films
- Lists of highest-grossing films
- List of films with live action and animation
