= Once Upon a Time (2017 Russian film) =

- Russian: Жили-были
- Directed by: Eduard Parri
- Written by: Anastasiya Palchikova; Ilya Tilkin; Valery Todorovsky
- Produced by: Ekaterina Sarycheva
- Starring: Fyodor Dobronravov; Roman Madyanov; Irina Rozanova
- Cinematography: Sergey Mikhalchuk
- Music by: Anna Drubich; Pavel Karmanov
- Release date: November 5, 2017 (Sputnik Russian Film Festival)
- Country: Russia
- Language: Russian

Once Upon a Time (Russian: Жили-были) is a 2017 Russian comedy-drama film directed by Eduard Parri.

== Plot ==
The film takes place in a village where two adult men live, between which the war for a widowed woman begins.

== Cast ==
- Fyodor Dobronravov as Grishka
- Roman Madyanov as Lyokha
- Irina Rozanova as Tatiana
