= Soho Media =

Russian television production company

- Company type: Production company
- Industry: production, TV-production, entertainment, sketch shows, TV shows, sitcoms
- Founded: 1993
- Headquarters: Moscow based
- Products: Just Kidding Me, Minute of Fame, The Great Race
- Owner: CTC Media

Soho Media has been operating on the Russian TV market for over fifteen years. It specializes in the production of entertainment TV shows, such as the highly popular Minute of Fame and The Great Race. For the past five years Soho Media worked in close cooperation with FremantleMedia. For CTC Network Soho Media adapted Just Kidding Me which is hosted by Russian pop star Glyukoza and produced the original Russian talent search show similar to American Idol.
