= List of highest-grossing Russian films =

According to Kinopoisk, the highest-grossing Russian films are the following, as of early 2023.

This list does not include earlier Soviet films, which are listed separately on the list of highest-grossing films in the Soviet Union.

== Overall list ==
Up until the 2000s, the Russian box office was typically reported in terms of box office admissions (ticket sales), rather than gross revenue.

Films that are currently in cinema

Highest-grossing Russian films
Rank	Title	Gross ($)	Year
1	Чебурашка 2 Cheburashka 2	$108,508,080	2026
2	Чебурашка Cheburashka	$94,508,080	2023
3	Сталинград Stalingrad	$68,129,518	2013
4	Движение вверх Going Vertical	$66,300,000	2017
5	Холоп Serf	$62,229,664	2019
6	Ирония судьбы. Продолжение Irony of Fate: The Sequel	$55,639,114	2007
7	Ночной дозор Night Watch	$50,336,279	2004
8	Холоп 2 Serf 2	$49,373,406	2024
9	Волшебник Изумрудного города. Дорога из жёлтого кирпича The Wizard of the Emerald City	$42,981,468	2025
10	Дневной дозор Day Watch	$42,918,532	2006
11	Волкодав Wolfhound	$42,834,502	2006
12	Ёлки 3 Yolki 3	$40,267,368	2013
13	Вий Viy	$39,539,416	2014
14	Бременские музыканты The Bremen Town Musicians	$39,190,596	2023
15	Адмиралъ Admiral	$39,143,985	2008
16	Т-34 T-34	$37,410,850	2018
17	Викинг Viking	$33 700 000	2016
18	Три богатыря на дальних берегах Three Knights at the Distant Shores	$33,674,759	2012
19	Последний Богатырь: Корень зла The Last Warrior: Root of Evil	$33,396,899	2021
20	Финист. Первый богатырь Finist. The First Warrior	$31,892,047	2024
21	Последний Богатырь The Last Warrior	$30,618,274	2017
22	Обитаемый остров The Inhabited Island	$30,511,231	2009
23	Самый лучший фильм The Best Movie	$30,496,695	2008
24	Лёд Ice	$29,806,210	2018
25	Мастер и Маргарита The Master and Margarita	$29,753,763	2024
26	Последний богатырь: Посланник тьмы The Last Warrior: A Messenger of Darkness	$29,673,715	2021
27	Легенда №17 Legend № 17	$29,523,237	2013
28	Экипаж Flight Crew	$29,171,110	2016
29	Иван Царевич и серый волк Ivan Tsarevich and the Gray Wolf	$29,000,000	2011
30	По щучьему велению Wish of the Fairy Fish	$28,757,189	2023
31	Ёлки 2 Yolki 2	$28,719,002	2011
32	Высоцкий. Спасибо, что живой Vysotsky. Thank You For Being Alive	$27,544,905	2011
33	Полицейский с Рублёвки. Новогодний беспредел VIP Policeman	$27,222,681	2018
34	Простоквашино Prostokvashino	$26,715,477	2026
35	Буратино Buratino	$26,533,829	2026
36	9 рота The 9th Company	$26,146,165	2005
37	Вызов The Challenge	$26,064,906	2023
38	Ёлки Yolki	$25,030,264	2010
39	Лёд 2 Ice 2	$22,383,481	2020
40	Наша Russia: Яйца судьбы Our Russia. The Balls of Fate	$22,213,287	2010
41	Пророк. История Александра Пушкина The Poet	$21,743,188	2025
42	Чёрная молния Black Lightning	$21,500,000	2009
43	Иван Царевич и Серый волк 2 Ivan Tsarevich and the Gray Wolf 2	$20,962,988	2013
44	Лёд 3 Ice 3	$20,776,041	2024
45	Батя 2. Дед Batya 2: Ded	$20,700,309	2025
46	Горыныч My Pet Dragon	$20,164,285	2025
47	Август August	$20,033,990	2025
48	О чём ещё говорят мужчины What Men Still Talk About	$19,705,392	2011
49	Притяжение Attraction	$19,454,845	2017
50	Три богатыря. Ход конём Three Knights. Horse Course	$19,390,136	2015
51	Три богатыря и Шамаханская царица Three Knights and the Queen of Shamakha	$19,010,585	2010
52	Конёк-горбунок Upon the Magic Roads	$18,959,116	2021
53	Турецкий гамбит The Turkish Gambit	$18,520,000	2005
54	Вторжение Invasion	$16,653,687	2020
55	Самый лучший фильм 2 The Best Movie 2	$15,672,437	2009
56	Сердце Пармы Land of Legends	$15,104,681	2022

== Most expensive Russian films ==
Below is a list of the 13 most high-budget Russian films by production cost (excluding inflation).

#	Title	Year	Budget ($)
1	Burnt By The Sun 2: Exodus	2010	55,000,000
2	Viy 2: Journey to China	2019	49,168,000
3	Burnt by the Sun 3: The Citadel	2010	45,000,000
4	The Inhabited Island	2008	36,000,000
5	The Barber of Siberia	1998	35,000,000
6	Stalingrad	2013	30,000,000
7	Viy 3: Travel to India	TBA	27,000,000
8	Viy	2014	26,000,000
9	Matilda	2017	25,000,000
10	Sunstroke	2014	24,000,000
11	Admiral	2008	20,000,000
12	Cheburashka 2	2026	19,800,000
13	August Eighth	2012	19,000,000
14	Mongol	2007	18,000,000

== See also ==
- List of Russian films
- Cinema of Russia
