= Yuliana Slashcheva =

- Юлиана Слащёва
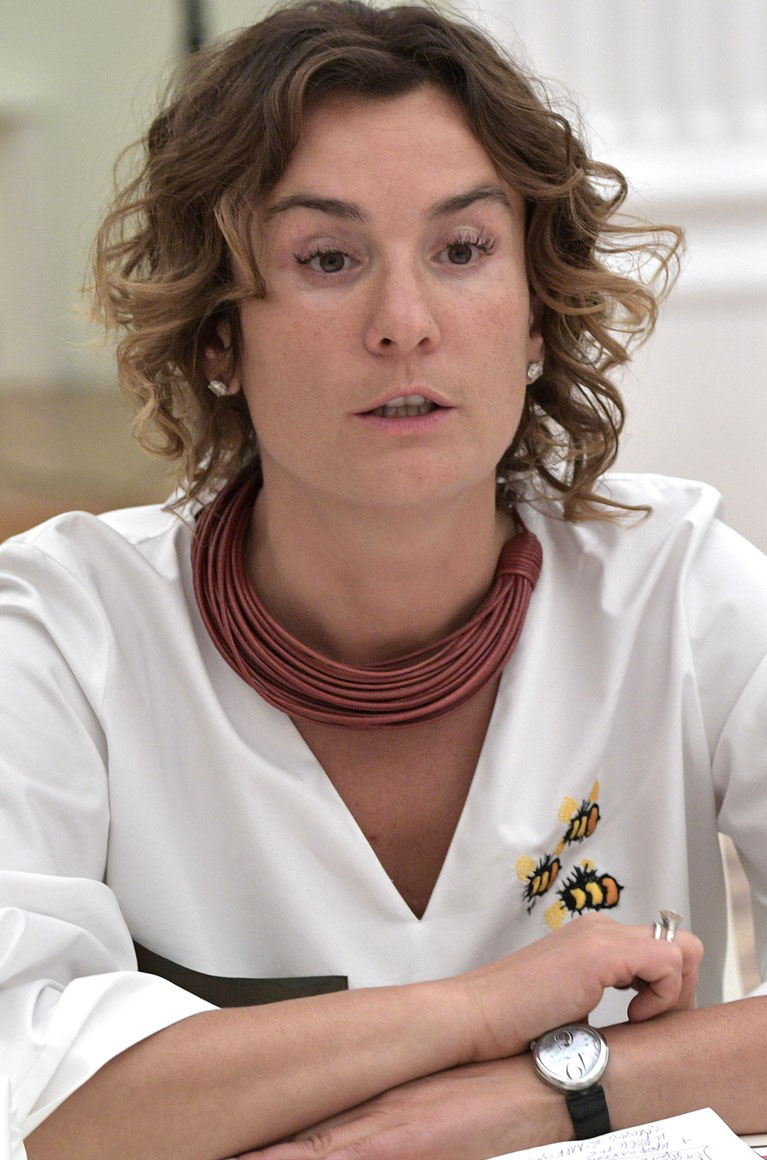
- Born: Yuliana Yuryevna Slashcheva; September 9, 1974 (age 52); Moscow, RSFSR, USSR
- Occupation: media manager
- Awards: Silver Archer (triple); Russia's Media Manager of the Year (2007)

Yuliana Yuryevna Slashcheva (Russian: Юлиа́на Ю́рьевна Слащёва; born 9 September 1974) is a media manager, a communications expert, Chairman of the Board at SMF Studio/Soyuzmultfilm (since 2017), Russia's oldest animation studio based in Moscow, Chairman of the Board for the Association of Animation film industry and CEO of the Gorky Film Studio (since 2019). Since November 14, 2018, she has been a member of the Board of the Federal Fund for Social and Economic Support of Russian Cinematography, as well as a member of the Board of Directors of Roskino. Prior to joining SMF Studio/Soyuzmultfilm she was the Chief Executive Officer of Russia's leading content holding CTC Media (2013—2016). Earlier she was the President and Chief Executive of Russia's largest strategic communications agency, Mikhailov & Partners, where she was responsible for the planning and delivery of major Russian and international projects. In November 2023, she joined the Russian part of the BRICS Women's Business Alliance

== Education and career ==
- In 1996, Yuliana Slashcheva earned a degree in economics, marketing and PR from Moscow University for the Humanities. She took an internship in U.S.-based Quasar Communications, and in 1994, she joined Mikhailov & Partners communications group.
- Between 2002 and 2004, Yuliana Slashcheva was the manager of corporate communications with ESN Group. In this role, she was responsible for external communications and relations with regional authorities, partners and mass media. During the same period, she has also served as Deputy Chief Executive of Russian energy company Kolenergo.
- In 2004, as a Partner and Consultant with BBDO Group, she led the creation of a PR agency within the group.
- In 2005, she returned to Mikhailov & Partners as its President. Yuliana Slashcheva has run over 200 communications campaigns for Russian and international clients during her term with this PR consultancy.

For 8 years, she was responsible for strategic development of the agency while overseeing the delivery of information campaigns for Russian and Western clients, communications support programs for government authorities and political associations, NGO reputation management programs, as well as investor relations and crisis communications programs.

== CTC Media ==
On August 1, 2013, Yuliana Slashcheva was appointed the Chief Executive Officer of CTC Media. She was tasked with enhancing the communications with CTC Media investors and advertisers, diversifying the holding's business, and ensuring that CTC Media becomes more than just a television company.

In November 2013, under Yuliana Slashcheva's leadership, CTC Media adopted a new development strategy focused on the transformation of CTC Media into a content holding with diversified revenue sources. To implement this strategy, CTC Media took a number of actions, such as developing the transmedia and licensing operations, launching new businesses and expanding the presence of its content across different platforms. Slashcheva launched a series of projects beyond the traditional television domain to implement the new strategy:

- CTC Media started to license its products for use in non-TV industries. The company signed a contract with Printdirect, an online print service offering personalized hoodies, T-shirts and mugs, licensing the use of images associated with the holding's TV projects. Slashcheva claims that this approach helps to improve the communications with company audiences. Upon the signing of the agreement, CTC Media opened its branded store on Printdirect website.
- CTC Media launched the Sweet Me online clothing store. The Wildberries project was chosen as the store operator, while CTC Media focused on product placement of the brand into its channels and projects.
- In October 2014, one of the holding’s channels Domashny launched its new design and presented an animated logo unique for the Russian market.
- In 2014, CTC Media content was launched on the Hulu. Internet streaming platform. According to Slashcheva, Roskino actively supported the negotiation of this launch. For Hulu and Hulu Plus, CTC Media featured a lineup of TV series in a variety of genres.
- As a part of the new business development program, CTC Media launched its fourth channel, CTC Love, in January 2014. Since the beginning of 2015, the new channel has acquired 0.78% share of the All 11-34 audience. CTC Love achieved even more impressive results with the Women 11-34 audience where it has consistently had over 1% share in 2015. Earlier in October 2014, CTC Love received the Golden Ray award in the Brightest Launch nomination.
- In December 2014, the number of Molodezhka community subscribers on Vkontakte reached one million. In January 2015, CTC Media launched the first mobile game in the Molodezhka franchise.
- To reinforce its digital business, in January 2015, CTC Media acquired Caramba TV, a producer of digital and transmedia content.
- In August 2015, CTC Media launched Europe's first channel-wide application “CTC. Second Screen” integrating its TV programming with additional content delivered to mobile devices. The app was first used for the second season of the Molodezhka TV series. Support for other programming was added later.
- In November 2015, CTC Media launched the new Che channel about “real men”, using the frequency previously occupied by Peretz.
- In 2016, CTC Media opened a TV studio for children under the partnership agreement with KidZania park in Moscow.

The new development program helped CTC Media to become Russia's first TV holding to build a profitable digital and transmedia business. In 2014, new amendments to the Russian mass media law limited the aggregate foreign beneficial ownership or control of Russian mass media to no more than 20% starting from January 1, 2016. This limitation applied to CTC Media holding as well. As the result, the holding owners and the management team started thinking about changing the company ownership.

After setting up the sale of CTC Media from its owners to Alisher Usmanov's and Ivan Tavrin's UTH by September, Yuliana Slashcheva told the media that this scenario would help the company management to focus on core business as it would solve the issues arising from the changes to the mass media law. The final closure of this transaction in December 2015 required the company shareholders’ approval. Slashcheva personally urged them to vote for the sale of CTC Media. The deal was completed on December 24, 2015. It was announced at the same time that Slashcheva would continue in her role in the company.

Upon the sale consummation, Yuliana Slashcheva together with UTH representatives was elected to the Board of the new managing entity, CTC Investments, which became the owner of Russian and Kazakh assets of CTC Media. Her authority as the CEO of the holding itself was expanded.

May 26, 2016 it became known that Yuliana Slashcheva leaves the CTC Media.

== SMF Studio (Soyuzmultfilm) and Gorky Film Studio ==
On February 3, 2017, by order of the Minister of Culture of the Russian Federation, she was appointed Chairman of the Board of the SMF Studio. For the period 2017-2020 a huge amount of work has been done to restore the film studio and its development:

- Until 2017, the legendary animation studio of the Soviet era occupied premises on Dolgorukovskaya Street in Moscow, which were in disrepair when Yuliana Slashcheva took office. The studio has been mostly focused on the production of the short films;
- Having moved to a new, technologically equipped building, the film studio paid off debts to the government and authors over several years, and the total turnover of money in 2019 amounted to more than a billion rubles, where half is the company's commercial proceeds;
- Almost 100% of the rights to characters and cartoons have been returned
- For the first time the film studio held a rebranding and developed a new corporate identity;
- Production of series, feature-length and short-length animated films was launched. In 2020, SMF Studio has produced 1,087 minutes of animation, in 2021 it is planned to increase it to 1,800 minutes.
- Every year, author's films produced by SMF Studio are getting prestigious awards at international festivals and shows (the studio got 45 awards in 2020);
- The film studio is simultaneously developing in a whole range of areas: licensing activities, educational programs based on animation, organizing multi-format offline events, cultural and educational events;
- Over the past three years, the film studio has cooperated with large business partners to the implementation of its projects: Gazprommedia, Rosneft, Rosa-Khutor, Pochta Rossii and many others;
- In 2020, with the active participation of Yuliana Slashcheva, the film studio entered into an agreement and devised a development strategy together with SBER;
- According to this strategy, in the coming years SMF Studio plans to become one of the key players in the international market. The film studio is already creating several projects in partnership with a major global distributor and producer - Cyber Group Studios. Various films of the film studio, both from the "Golden Collection" and new projects, were purchased for distribution in more than 50 countries of the world.

On October 8, 2019, Yuliana Slashcheva was appointed CEO of the Gorky Film Studio

- The new team assessed the situation, worked out a new development strategy until 2026, hold a rebranding and relaunched the production center;
- The studio develops new feature films, documentary and popular science projects, including series on a variety of topics. In total - about 50 promising projects;
- Over the next five years, the Gorky Film Studio plans to increase its production volume almost tenfold. And all of these will be either festival-level projects or spectator projects for successful distribution;
- After the rebranding, despite the pandemic, two films have already been released for theatrical distribution, created with the participation of the Gorky Film Studio as a co-producer. Several feature films and documentaries have also been completed;
- The film studio is negotiating with major partners, strategic agreements have already been reached with leading media holdings for the production and aggregation of modern content;
- In addition, the studio participates in completely new events that are aimed at developing a cinema industry and mainstreaming the studio's Golden Collection with the support of the Ministry of Culture of the Russian Federation. Festivals, competitions, shows - are planned to be held annually;
- The film studio is actively looking for new talents, conducts its own pitches, open-call;
- In the coming years, the studio plans to open a leisure and educational center for children and a film school for teenagers;
- The strategic goal is to build a creative cluster on the basis of the Gorky Film Studio, where people can study, improve their skills and implement any projects of any direction.

== Accomplishments and awards ==
- Silver Archer (triple winner).
- In 2007, ranked one of the most influential business women in Russia, according to the Career magazine.
- Flawless Reputation annual award of the Komsomolskaya Pravda newspaper in the Best PR Expert nomination.
- In 2007 and 2008, Slashcheva made the top ten of the Professional Services category of the Russia's Top 1000 Managers rating compiled by the Association of Russia's Managers and Kommersant publishing house.
- 2007 Russia's Media Manager of the Year award in the Public Relations nomination.
- 2008 Person of the Year award in the Special Nomination for outstanding contribution to the positive image of Russian business.
- Top spot in the 2012 Top 100 PR Professionals — Best PR Agency Directors ranking of the Career magazine.
- In 2012, 2013 and 2015 Yuliana Slashcheva was included in the Russia's 50 Most Influential Business Women rating of the Company magazine.
- In 2015, Yuliana Slashcheva was included in Kommersant's Executive Rating in the Media Business category.
- In 2015, Yuliana Slashcheva was included in The 20 Most Powerful Women in Global TV 2015 rating of the major film industry magazine, The Hollywood Reporter.
- In 2017, she was included in Kommersant's Executive Rating in the Media Business category.
- In 2020, Yuliana Slashcheva has returned to the Executive Rating in the Media Business category, that is being published by reputable Russian outlet - Kommersant.
- In 2020, she received the Grand Prix of the "Media Manager of Russia-2020" award.

== Personal life ==
Yuliana Slashcheva is married to Sergei Mikhailov. She has a daughter and two sons.
