= Marina Konyashkina =

Russian actress of theater and cinema

- Born: 7 July 1985 (age 40); Minsk, Byelorussian SSR, Soviet Union
- Citizenship: Russia
- Occupations: Theater and film actress
- Years active: 2005–present
- Website: marinakonyashkina.info

Marina Sergeevna Konyashkina (born July 7, 1985, Minsk, Byelorussian SSR, USSR.) — Russian actress of theater and cinema.

== Biography ==
Marina Konyashkina was born on July 7, 1985 in Minsk, Belarusian SSR. Father is a military man, mother is a teacher of the Belarusian language. There is a brother, also a military man. The family lives in Minsk.

From 1992 to 2002, Marina studied at secondary school No. 84 in Minsk.

While studying at school, she did not even think of becoming an actress. Since early childhood, I dreamed of traveling. But, having once met a friend who, with her theater studio, visited festivals in Paris and other European cities, Marina also went to the studio. However, I managed to go only to Gatchina, after which I went to Moscow to study acting.

In 2005, while still a student at a theater university, Marina Konyashkina made her debut in cinema, playing the main role of the girl Nadia in the military drama "Deep Current" (produced by Belarusfilm), based on the novels "Snowy Winters" and "Deep Current" by the Belarusian writer Ivan Shamyakin, and dedicated to the 60th anniversary of Victory in the Great Patriotic War.

In 2007, she graduated from the Acting Faculty of the Boris Shchukin Theater Institute (Pavel Lyubimtsev's course).

Immediately after graduating from the Institute, she was accepted into the troupe of the Chekhov Moscow Art Theater, making her debut on its stage in the main role in the play "Undine" based on the play of the same name by Jean Girodou staged by Nikolai Skorik. In addition to this performance, since 2009 Marina has been engaged in productions of The Pickwick Club directed by Evgeny Pisarev and The Noble Nest directed by Marina Brusnikina. The actress continues to cooperate with the Chekhov Moscow Art Theater to the present

Marina Konyashkina is not married. She lives in Moscow

== Creation ==
=== Roles in the theater ===
==== Moscow Art Theater named after A. P. Chekhov ====
- 2007 — "Undine" (based on the play "Undine" by Jean Girodu, directed by Nikolai Skorik) — Undine (main role)
- 2009 — "The Pickwick Club" (based on the novel "Posthumous Notes of the Pickwick Club" by Charles Dickens, directed by Evgeny Pisarev) — Emily Wardle, the landowner's daughter
- 2009 — "The Noble Nest" (based on the novel "The Noble Nest" by Ivan Turgenev, directed by Marina Brusnikina) — a girl

=== Filmography ===
2005 — Deep Current — Hope (main role)

2007 — Temptation — Vika

2008 — Rich and Beloved — episode

2008 — The Life that Didn't Exist — Vika

2008 — Krasin's Defense (season 2) - Lera Bozhko, owner of a consulting company

2009 — Barvikha — Frolova

2009 — Chamomile, cactus, daisy — Margarita Fedotova (Margot) (main role)

2009 — The Bodyguard (Season 2) — Tatiana Krasavina, a young archaeologist

2010 — Alexandra — Alexandra Kulikova, ambulance paramedic (main role)

2010 — Doctor — Irina Polezhaeva, ward doctor

2010 — Everything for You — Natalia, Irina's adopted daughter (main role)

2010 — Baby's House — Tamara, Vera's friend

2010 — The Bodyguard (Season 3) — Tatiana Krasavina, a young archaeologist

2010 — Sheriff — Lera

2011 — We declare war on you — Sveta (main role)

2011 — Amazons — Varvara Arkadyevna Krestovskaya, agent of the special experimental Unit (SEP) "Amazons", forensic expert (main role)

2011 — The Lavrova Method (film 11, Black Eyes) — Olesya Levkova, waitress

2011 — Swallow's Nest — Elizaveta, Roma's friend

2011 — Manticore — episode

2011 — Let them talk — Galina Starostina

2012 — At Risk (episode # 9) — Mary Fidelity Holbrook and Evgenia Karabina, twin sisters

2012 - Baby — Galina Dmitrievna, physical education teacher

2012 — Cosmonautics — Valentina

2012 — The Right to the Truth — Angelina Lovtsova

2012 — Remedy for death — Victoria Martova, daughter of the official Vitaly Martov

2013 — Ticket for two — Varvara Prigozhina (main role)

2013 — Children of Aquarius — Love

2013 — Trap — Irina, Valuev's daughter

2013 — My dad is a pilot — Lyudmila Ermakova, waitress (main role)

2013 — While I live, I love — Victoria (main role)

2013 — The Price of Life — Elsa Rubashkina, lawyer

2013 — Black Cats — Daria Kirillovna Demidova, doctor (main role)[1]

2013 — Don't Let Me Go — Margarita Vladimirovna Samarkina, accountant (main role)

2014 — Son for father — Elena Kovaleva, nurse, sister of Pavel and Nikolai

2014 — Stunt performer — Alexandra, stuntman

2014 — Godfather — Katya, nurse

2014 — St. Petersburg–Moscow — Varya

2015 — Incorruptible — Olga Volgina, Gradov's wife

2015 — It can't be better — Victoria Chernova, banker's wife (main role) 2015 — Fifth floor without elevator — Serafima, realtor (main role)

2015 — Nikonov and Co — Anna (main role)

2015 — At the crossroads of joy and Sorrow — Vera

2016 — Her Alien Son — Anna Korabelnik (main role)

2016 — Karina Krasnaya — Karina (main role)

2016 — Claw from Mauritania 2 — Alexandra Moore, Police Major

2016 — House on the Cold Key — Arina Mironova (main role)

2017 — Breakfast in bed — Arina Voloshina (main role)

2017 — Torgsin — Rosa, the seller

2017 — Hostage — Inga (main role)

2018 — Malefactor — Sima (main role)

2018 — Undisclosed Talent 2 — Anna

2018 — Teacher — Tatiana Sorokina (main role)

2018 — Parental Right — Elena (main role)

2019 — City of Lovers — Alexandra (main role)

2019 — Holy Lie — Larisa

2019 — The Black Staircase — Elena Arkhipova, forensic expert

2019 — The Magic Word — Zhenya (main role)

2019 — Almost a Family Detective — Ganna (main role)

2019 — Union of Salvation — Princess Ekaterina Trubetskaya

2020 — The Crystal Trap — Olga (main role)

2020 — Someone Else's Sister — Katya

2020 — Gemini — Irma

2021 — Psychology of crime. Black cat in a dark room — Valentine

2021 — Unbroken — Anna Streltsova (main role)

2021 — The Secret of Lilith — Mila

2021 — When February ends — Olga Ryabinina (main role)

2021 — Registry Office — Lidia Ilyina (main role)

2022 — Cheburashka — Lyuba, Gena's wife

2022 — Last Chance — Nastya (main role)

== Links ==
- Marina Konyashkina at IMDb
- Marina Konyashkina on the KinoPoisk website. // kinopoisk.ru
- Marina Konyashkina on the website "Rusklno.ru ". // Rusklno.ru
- Marina Konyashkina on the website "Look". // smotrim.ru
- Marina Konyashkina's interview to Domashny magazine
