= Moya Mishel =

Russian musical group

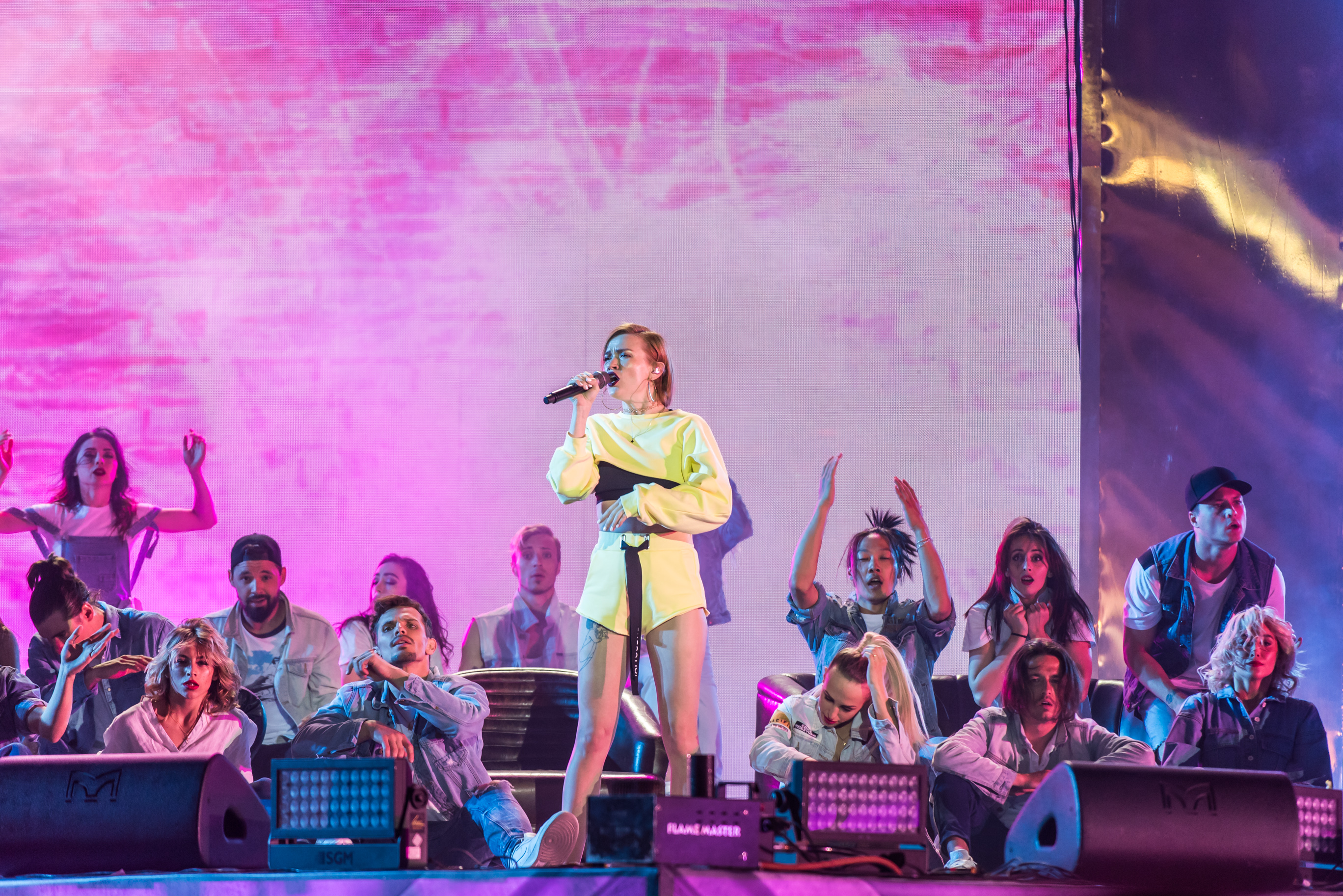
Moya Mishel in 2018

Moya Mishel (Russian: Моя Мишель, lit. 'My Michelle') is a Russian musical group from Blagoveshchensk founded in 2009. In their work, the group uses synth-pop and pop-rock styles. The group's vocalist, founder, and songwriter is Tatyana Tkachuk.

== Band members ==
- Tatyana Tkachuk — vocals
- Pavlo Shevchuk — production, arrangements, keyboards, drum machine, e-percussion
- Renat Samigullin — guitars

=== Former members ===
- Dmitry Streltsov — bass guitar
- Mikhail Lisov — bass guitar
- Denis Marinkin — drums
- Oleg Burakov — drums

== Discography ==
=== Studio albums ===
- 2013: Ты мне нравишься / Ty Mne Nravishsya / I Like You
- 2015: Химия / Khimia / Chemistry
- 2016: Отстой / Otstoy / Sucks
- 2018: Люби меня до конца мира / Lyubi Menya Do Kontsa Mira / Love Me Till The End Of The World
- 2022: Из цветов и темноты / Is Tsvetov I Temnoty / Of Flowers And Darkness
- 2025: Ангелы и не очень / Angely I Ne Ochen' / Angels And Not Very

== EP ==
- 2015: Дура / Dura / Stupid Girl
- 2020: Наивность. Часть 1 / Naivnost'. Chast' Pervaya / Naivety. Part One
- 2020: Наивность. Часть 2 / Naivnost'. Chast' Vtoraya / Naivety. Part Two
