= Fyodor Dobronravov =

Russian actor

- Фёдор Добронравов
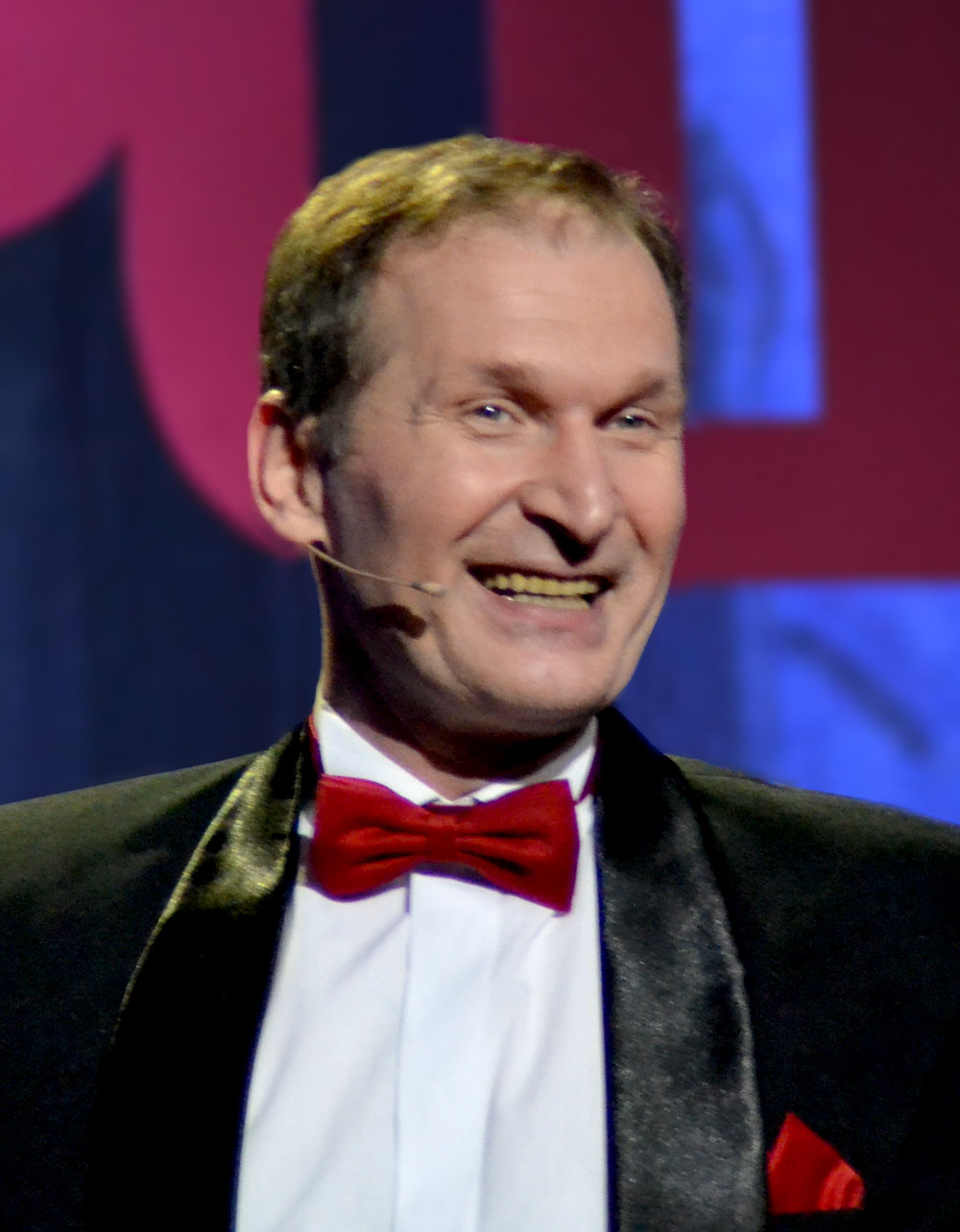
- Dobronravov in 2011
- Born: Fyodor Viktorovich Dobronravov; September 11, 1961 (age 64); Taganrog, Rostov Oblast, RSFSR, USSR
- Citizenship: Soviet Union (until 1991); Russia
- Occupation: Actor
- Years active: 1990
- Spouse: Irina Dobronravova
- Children: Viktor Dobronravov; Ivan Dobronravov
- Website: http://fedordobronravov.ru/

Fyodor Viktorovich Dobronravov (Russian: Фёдор Викторович Добронравов; born 11 September 1961) is a Soviet and Russian stage and cinema actor, Honored Artist of Russia (2002), People's Artist of Russia (2011). He is an actor, known for Kadetstvo (TV series 2006 - 2007), Playing the Victim (film) (2006) and The end of the Belle Époque (2015). In 2006–2015, he was one of the main actors of the sketch show 6 kadrov.

== Biography ==
Dobronravov was born in the city of Taganrog, Rostov Oblast, Russian SFSR, Soviet Union. Since his childhood, Dobronravov's dream was to become a circus clown, and as a school student he worked at the open-air summer theater in Gorky Park (Taganrog). After school, since 1978 he made several attempts to enter the State University of Circus and Variety Arts (better known as Moscow Circus School), but without success. After military service Dobronravov had to return to Taganrog and worked as metalworker, furniture mounter, electrician, etc.

Both sons of Fyodor Dobronravov, Viktor Dobronravov and Ivan Dobronravov are Russian actors.

In November 2017 Dobronravov was banned from entering Ukraine for three years for publicly supporting the 2014 Russian annexation of Crimea. He expressed support for the Russian invasion of Ukraine and performed at a military hospital in Samara in 2022.

== Selected filmography ==
- Playing the Victim (2006)
- Liquidation (2007, TV)
- Big Difference (2008–2014, TV)
- Svaty (season 1-6: 2008–2012, season 7: 2021-2022 TV)
- The Brothers Karamazov (2009, TV)
- In the Style of Jazz (2010)
- All Inclusive (2011)
- Moms (2012)
- The Snow Queen 2 (2014, voice)
- Once Upon a Time (2018)
- Cheburashka
- Finist. The First Warrior
- Seven Versts Before Dawn (2026)
