= CTC Media =

Russian independent broadcasting company

STS Media LLC
- Native name: ООО «СТС Медиа»
- Company type: Joint venture
- Traded as: Nasdaq: CTCM; NYSE: CTCM
- Industry: Broadcasting, entertainment, TV, free-to-air broadcasting, TV production
- Founded: 1989; 37 years ago
- Headquarters: Moscow, Russia
- Key people: Viacheslav Murugov (CEO)
- Revenue: $472 million (2017)
- Operating income: $7.27 million (2017)
- Net income: $6.72 million (2017)
- Total assets: $857 million (2017)
- Total equity: $702 million (2017)
- Owner: National Media Group (49%); VTB (51%)
- Website: http://www.ctcmedia.ru/

CTC Media LLC is a Russian broadcasting company with headquarters in Moscow, Russia.

== History ==
CTC Media (till 2004 - StoryFirst Communications) was established by a U.S. entrepreneur Peter Gerwe in 1989 in Delaware in the United States. In 1991 co-founded Russian-American radio station Maximum. The Group launched broadcasting operations in 1991 with its own TV station in St. Petersburg. Channel Six of St. Petersburg started broadcasting in other regions in 1994.

National TV channel CTC debuted in 1996, Russia's first thematic channel Domashny was launched in 2005.

In 2009, СTC Media began international satellite broadcasting in North America as CTC International. In June 2010, the launch of international broadcasting took place in Israel. In March 2011, CTC Media started international broadcasting in Germany, and later in May 2011, a number of agreements were signed to start broadcasting on two new platforms in North America. In October 2011, CTC International increased its footprint in North America and began broadcasting in the Baltic states. As of February 2012, the international version of CTC began broadcasting in Europe, as well as in a number of countries in North Africa, the Middle East, and Central Asia. CTC-International started broadcasting in Kyrgyzstan in April 2012, and launched in Armenia, Georgia, and Azerbaijan in May the same year. CTC International is available in Thailand since July 2012.

The Everest Sales advertising agency was established in the autumn 2010 and is responsible for selling the advertising inventory of CTC, Domashny, Che and CTC Love, the Group’s Videomore.ru and Domashniy.ru internet portal. It also manages advertising sales in the Commonwealth of Independent States for Channel 31 group of companies in Kazakhstan.

In December 2010, Videomore was launched as the first Social TV Network in Russia. The site combines all the advantages of a professional video portal with those of a social network. Since 2012, it also offers content of Channel Five and Ren. In October 2011, CTC Media introduced the Domashniy portal as an online extension of Domashny TV channel, which is aimed at a female audience.

In October 2013, Peretz International (international version of Peretz channel) began broadcasting in cable networks in Belarus. In January 2014, launch took place in Kyrgyzstan.

In spring 2014, CTC Media launched the new channel CTC Love on cable and satellite platforms, and signed a distribution deal with Hulu.

CTC Media was acquired by the private, Nicosia, Cyprus-based firm Telcrest Investments Limited in the spring of 2016.

== Business activity ==
In December 2007, the Group acquired TV content production facilities Soho Media for $10 million and Konstantin Kikichev’s CostaFilm for $40 million. The companies were merged into Story First Production in July 2011.

In 2008, CTC Media acquired a 20% interest in Channel 31 group of companies in Kazakhstan for $65 million and it began broadcasting in CTC format. In October 2008, the Group acquired a 51% stake in the TeleDixi broadcasting company in Moldova for $4.1 million. Also in 2008, CTC Media and Terra Group established a broadcasting company SofTS in Uzbekistan. However, it did not take off and was divested in 2010.

In April 2008, CTC Media acquired DTV channel (currently – Che) from the Group’s shareholder Modern Times Group.

In 2006, CTC Media acquired TV company Orion in Samara, Russia, and went on to acquire RIO in the same region in May 2011.

== Shareholders ==
CTC Media went public on June 1, 2006, at $14 per share and was listed on NASDAQ under the symbol "CTCM". Owners of the Group offered 16.38% with the total IPO value of $345.9 million. As of February 26, 2009, CTC Media market capitalization amounted to $504 million.

The company's common stock ceased to trade on the NASDAQ Global Select Market in May 2016.

== CEOs ==
- Peter Gerwe (1989–2004)
- Alexander Rodnyansky (2004–2008)
- Anton Kudryashov (2008–2011)
- Boris Podolskiy (2011–2013)
- Yuliana Slashcheva (2013–2016)
- Viacheslav Murugov (2016–present)

== Businesses ==
СTC Media incorporates five nationwide free-to-air television channels in Russia (CTC, Domashny, Che, CTC Love, Kazakhstan (Channel 31) with a combined potential audience of over 150 million people. CTC-International is available in Israel, Germany, Latvia, Lithuania, Estonia, the US, Canada and Australia. International versions of Domashniy and Peretz are available in the CIS countries, and Europe, Georgia, Mongolia, in the US and Australia. International version of Peretz channel is also available in the Baltic states and in Cyprus. The Group incorporates EvereST-S advertising sales agency, Social TV Network VideoMore.Ru, and CTC.ru, Domashniy.ru, Chetv.ru, CTCLove.ru portals as well as Caramba TV.
