= Channel 31 (Kazakhstan) =

31 канал Channel 31
- Country: Kazakhstan
- Broadcast area: Kazakhstan
- Headquarters: Almaty, Kazakhstan

Programming
- Languages: Kazakh, Russian
- Picture format: 576i SDTV

Ownership
- Owner: Verny capital Group of companies (100%)

History
- Launched: 24 October 1992 (regular broadcast); 12 April 1993 (official broadcast)

Links
- Website: www.31.kz

Availability

Terrestrial
- Digital terrestrial television: Channel 13

Channel 31 is a Kazakh nationwide broadcast television station that is based in Almaty, Kazakhstan.

Channel 31 consists of news and thematic programs in both Russian and Kazakh, as well as movies, series, talk shows, and children's, cultural, historical and entertainment programs.

== History ==
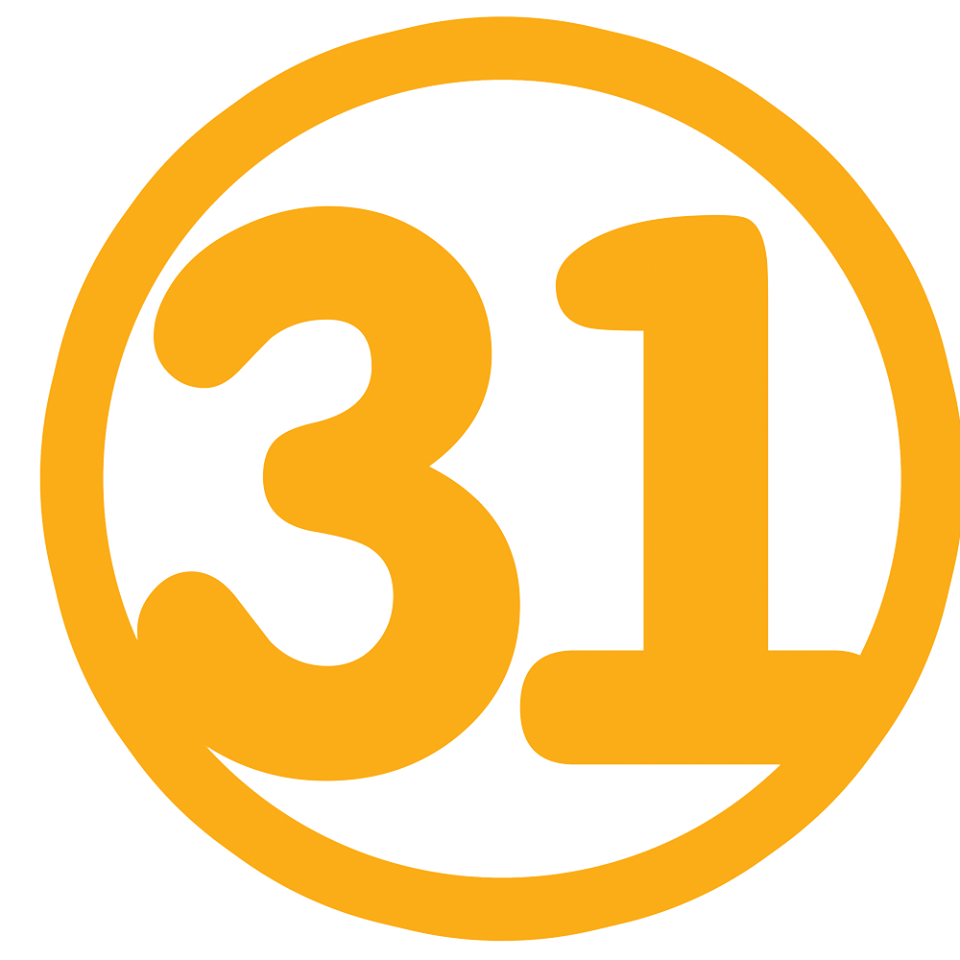
Former logo of Channel 31, used until 2020.

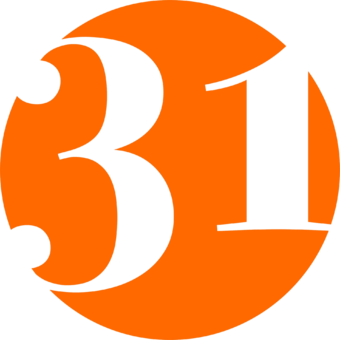
Former logo of Channel 31, used until 2026.

The channel was launched on 24 October 1992, and during its official start, it had first begun its regular broadcasts, when it is based on TRC "31 Channel". Later, on 12 April 1993, it was directly commencing its official broadcasts in Alma-Ata under the name of "Channel 31", but as of today, LLP "Broadcasting" Channel 31 is a group of companies Mediaholding Channel 31. 100% shares of Television and Radio Company Channel 31 LLP are owned by the Verny Capital Group of Companies, the owner and shareholder of which is Bulat Utemuratov.

== Timeline ==
- 24 October 1992 – the channel is launched and is based on TRC "31 Channel".
- 12 April 1993 – the first airing of "Channel 31" in Alma-Ata.
- 4 October 1994 – airing Radio 31 in Alma-Ata at the frequency FM 103,5 MHz.
- 1 February 2001 – TRC "31 Channel" formed a national television network from 14 cities of Kazakhstan.
- In June 2003 it started broadcasting in digital format from the satellite Intelsat 904, which expanded the coverage area.
- February 2008 – completion of the transaction to acquire 20% of TRC Channel 31 Company "CTC Media".
- March 2008 – begins broadcasting in an updated format.
- January 2009 – appeared in the online channel's exclusive entertainment program in the Kazakh language "Juldyzben júzdesu"
- February 2009 – broadcast of the project was resumed Champions League, was broadcast 1/8 finals
- March 2009 – dublyazhnaya increased production. With the new name "Kúlegeshter" broadcasting "31" comic has expanded the program Funnier than Rabbits in Kazakh.
- April 2009 – the first time in history, Channel 31 started showing cash Turkish serials. The season premiere opens – Glow cocoon in Kazakh and Russian languages.
- August 2009 – started three new projects in the Kazakh language. Talk-show Pіkіr alańy intellectual game Bіlgіrler báıgesі and Biіk maqsat, the program promoted sport and dedicated time to the Asian Games in 2011.
- In 2009, Channel 31 and Russia's leading studios The Walt Disney Company CIS LLC entered into an exclusive agreement to acquire licensing rights to broadcast the film industry in the ether.
- September 2009 – the Kazakh-language comedy series Áńgime bolsyn and Ázіl studio debuted on Channel 31. The new season opened youth sketch show Give the youth and the sitcom, My Fair Nanny 2: Life after the wedding.
- September 2009 – Turkey launched the most scandalous episode "Valley of the Wolves".
- 18 November 2009 – started showing the third part of trilogy, "Valley of the Wolves: Ambush".
- 1 March 2010 – started showing popular Turkish TV series Love Symphony.
- 14 November 2011 – director Bagdad Kodzhahmetov appointed CEO of Channel 31 in Kazakhstan.
- In 2011, Channel 31 and leading American film studio Paramount Pictures signed an exclusive agreement to acquire licensing rights to broadcast the film industry in the ether.
- 26 January became aware of the new Kazakh premier series Bazarbaevtar held 16 April at 20:00 Almaty time.
- 25 June, 21:30 the new Turkish series Where is my daughter? premiered on Channel 31.
- 27 April 2015 – Filipino drama Forevermore premiered on Channel 31.
- Since March 16, 2023, 100% of the shares of Channel 31 have been owned by Verny Capital Management Company (Kazakhstan).

== Programming ==
- InformBuro.
- Humor Studio
- Rizam
- TikTok show
- 31 Jokes
- Time Vine
- What's up
- 1001 Jokes
- BALA BATTLE
