= Domashny =

Russian TV channel for women

Domashny Домашний
- Country: Russia
- Broadcast area: Russia

Programming
- Picture format: 1080i HDTV (downscaled to 576i for the SD feed)

Ownership
- Owner: CTC Media
- Key people: Alexander Rodnyansky, former CEO

History
- Launched: 13 February 1995; 31 years ago (as Channel 31)
- Former names: 1995-1999: Channel 31; 1999-2005: M1

Links
- Website: www.domashniy.ru (only in Russia)

Availability

Terrestrial
- Digital terrestrial television: Channel 14

Domashny (Russian: Домашний, IPA: [dɐˈmaʂnʲɪj], lit. 'Home Channel') is a Russian TV network which targets female viewers aged 25–60. It was launched in March 2005. Domashny was aimed to deliver programming to capture an attractive audience in demand by advertisers, but traditionally under-served by broadcasters.

CTC Media created the Domashny brand in 2005 from the ground up. Today, Domashny has a potential audience of 63 million people. In 2006, Domashny's average audience share in its target demographic was 2.4%, compared to 1.7% in 2007.

Domashny Network in 2008 comprised four owned-and-operated stations. Before changing to digital TV signal, it had more than 230 affiliates, including 13 owned-and-operated stations.

Since 2019, Domashny changed to digital signal and stopped relationships with all the affiliates.

== Russian series ==
The programming of Domashny focuses on issues of interest to women including health, family, career, style and fashion. The most popular shows on Domashny include the legal show focusing on family issues, family cases, and a show centered on medical malpractice.

On Weekdays, Domashny's daily programming contains daily series and re-runs of prime-time series shown on the previous days; prime-time programming contains 4-episode Russian or Ukrainian series produced in partnership with the channel, which start at 7 pm, and re-runs of daily series, which are shown on 11:30 pm. Nightly programming contains old prime-time series, old daily shows and STS' old sketch shows.

On days off, daily programming contains Russian or Ukrainian series and channel's own shows; prime-time programming contains Turkish series, mostly shown series is Muhteşem Yüzyıl.

== Classic movies ==
Until 2013–2014, Domashny had been broadcasting other classic movies from the platinum collection of Hollywood. All the movies on Domashny had been aimed at family audience.

Nowadays, Domashny does not broadcast any foreign movies, making an exception for cinema of Ukraine.

== Foreign series ==
Until about 2013, Domashny had been offering its audience medical dramas such as the Emmy winning series ER and House M.D. For the younger viewers, it'd been offering the comedy sitcom ALF. Desperate Housewives, Bewitched, Latin American telenovelas shown on Domashny were named successful with its target audience.

- Cashmere Mafia
- Cougar Town
- Desperate Housewives
- Dirty Sexy Money
- ER
- The Good Wife
- House M.D.
- Lipstick Jungle
- Muhteşem Yüzyıl
- Murder, She Wrote
- Royal Pains
- Scrubs

Since 2013–2014, Domashny doesn't broadcast foreign series, not including Turkish series.
