= Sochi Arboretum =

Arboretum in Sochi, Russia

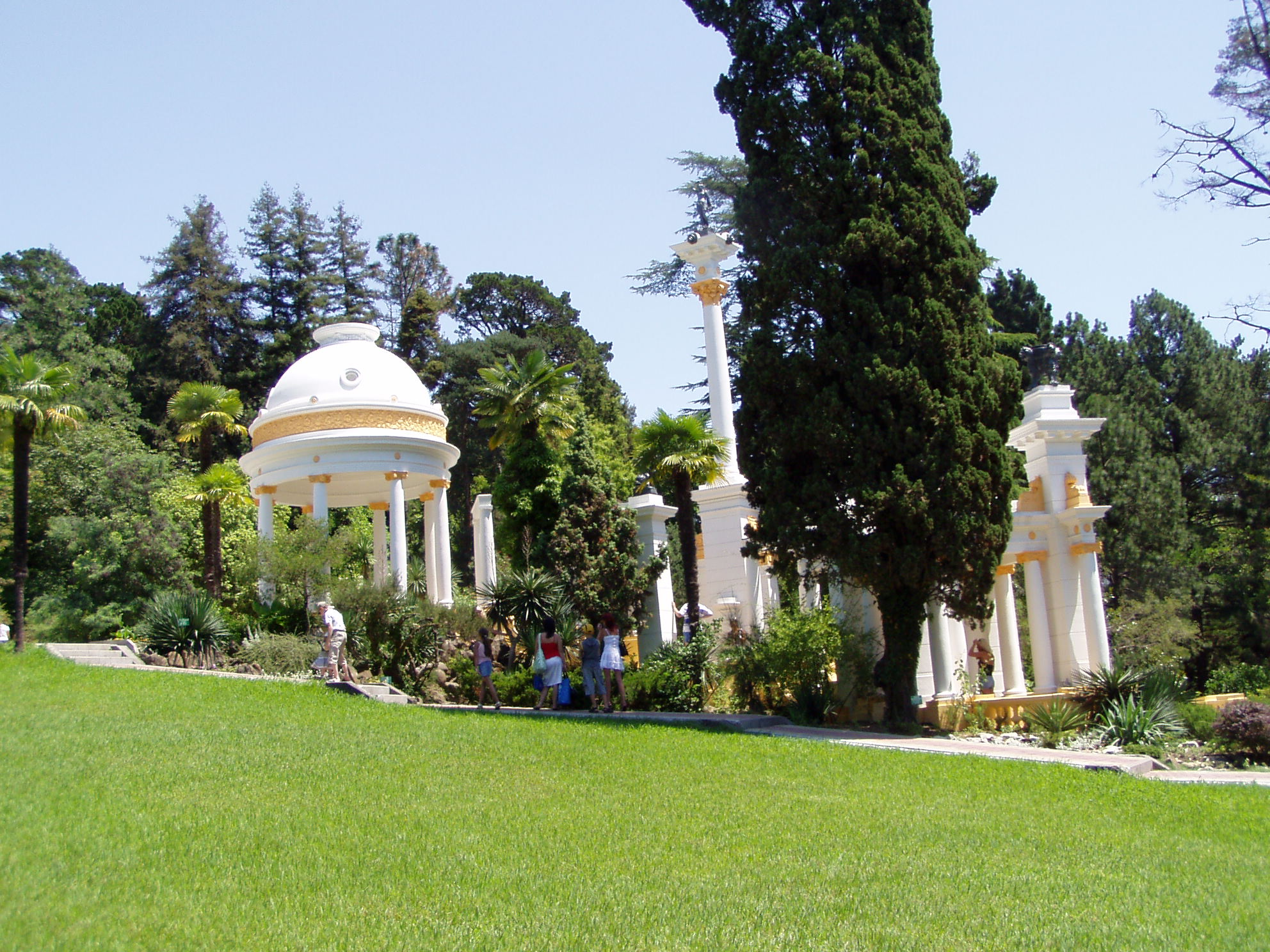
- View of Sochi Arboretum
- Interactive map of Sochi Arboretum
- Location: Sochi, Russia
- Coordinates: 43°35′N 39°43′E
- Area: 49 hectares (0.19 sq mi)
- Created: 1890
- Website: dendrarium.ru

The Sochi Arboretum is a unique collection of subtropical flora and fauna. It is a monument of landscape architecture located in the Khosta district of the city of Sochi, Krasnodar Krai, in Russia. It includes 76 species of pine, 80 species of oak, and 24 species of palm.

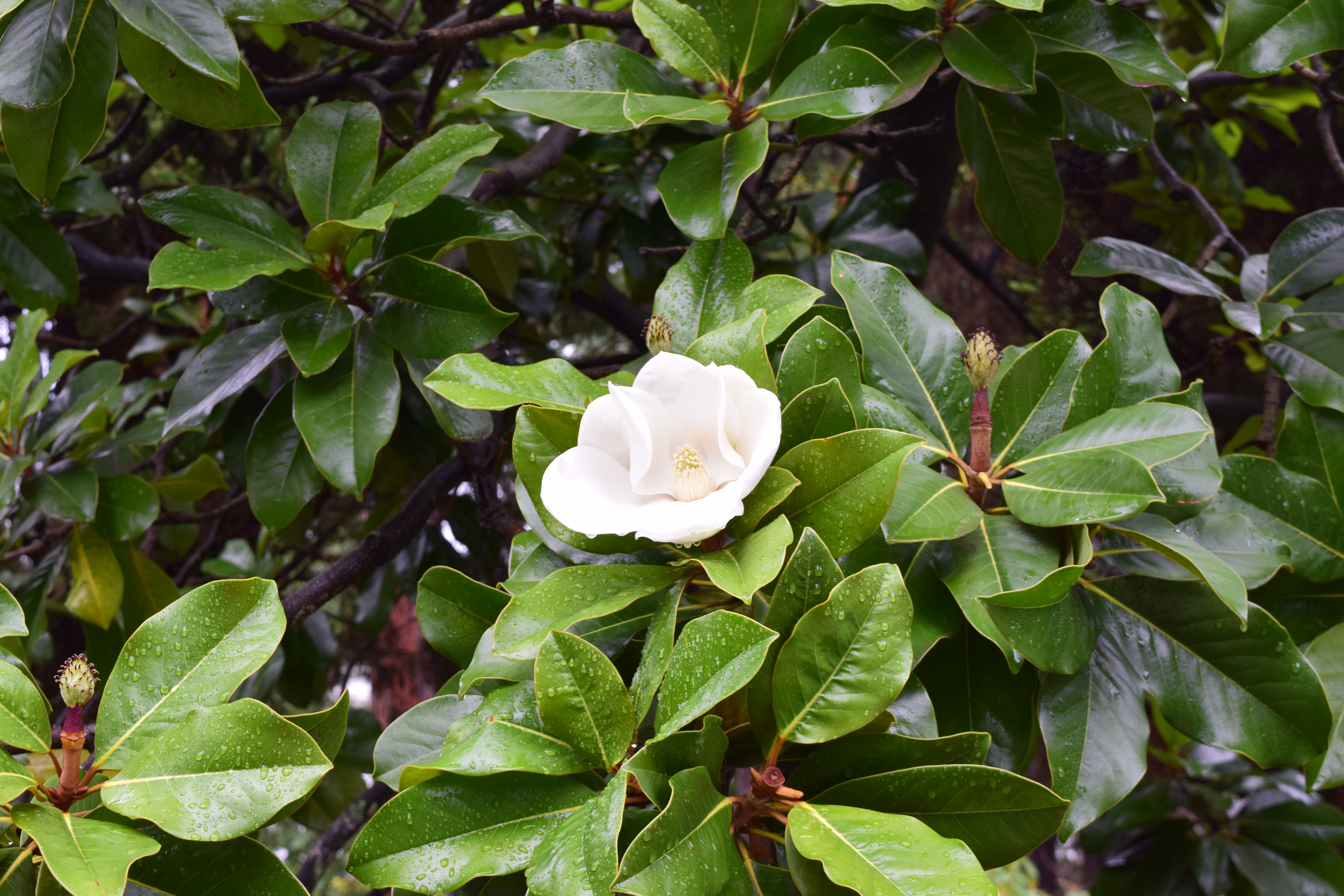

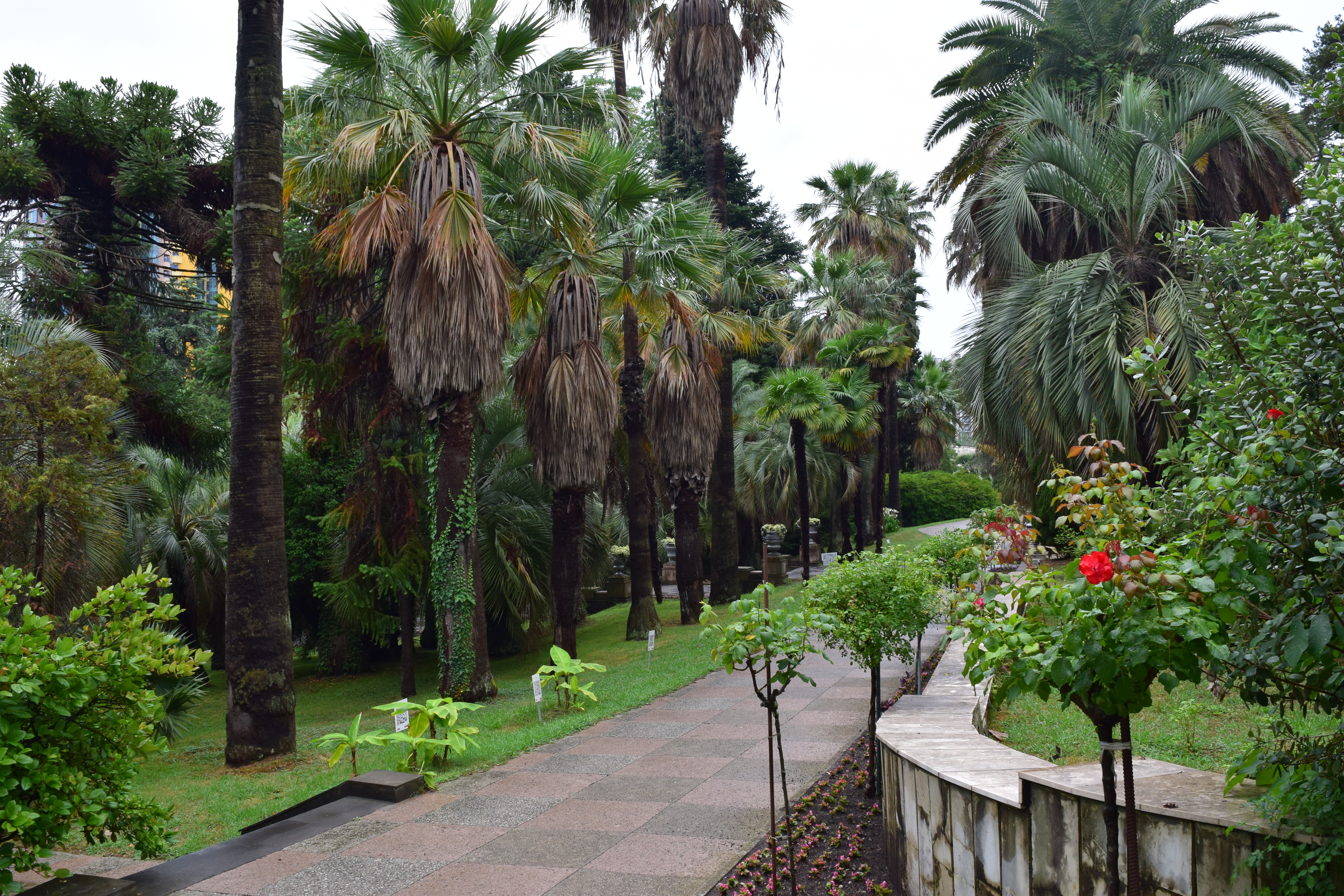

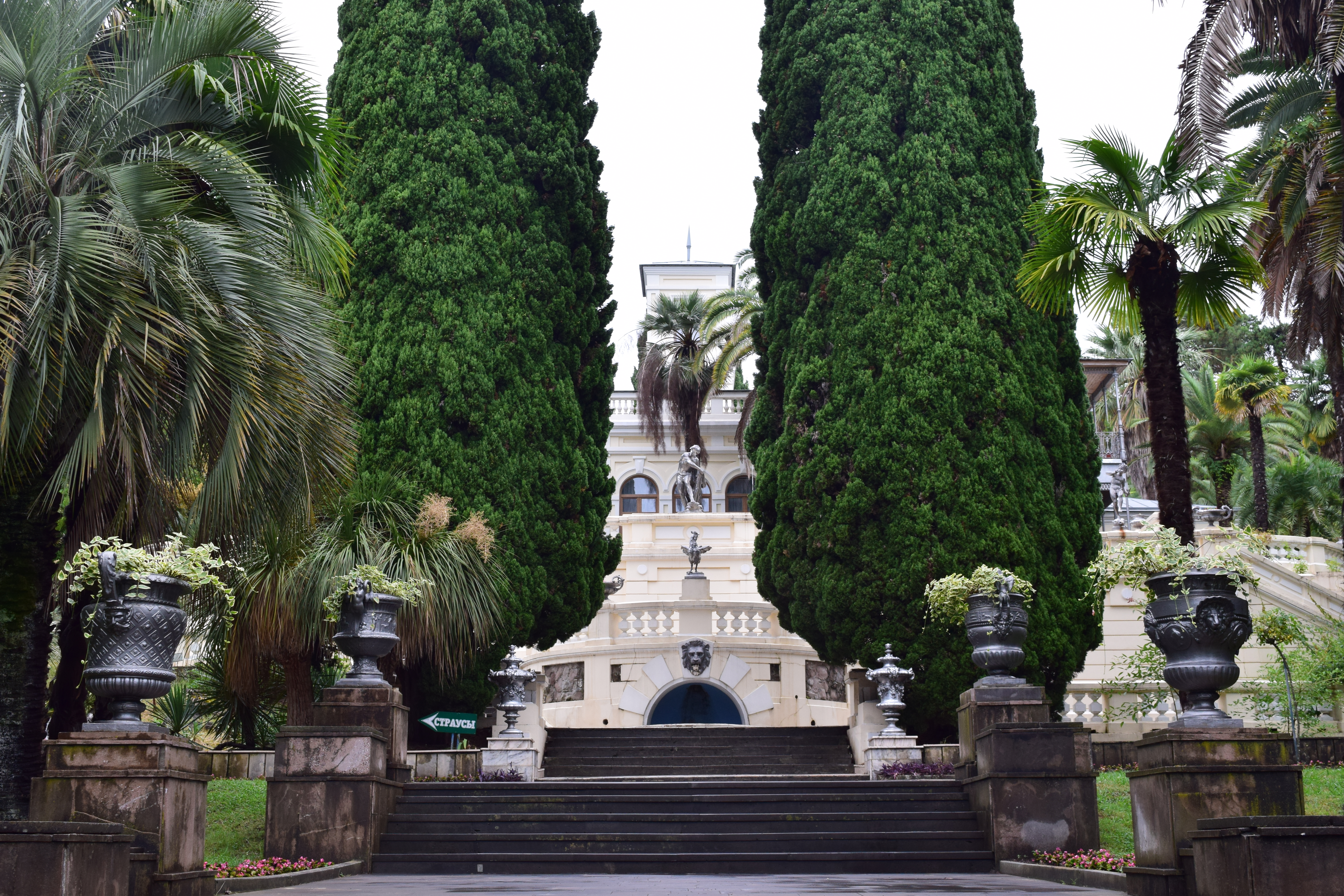
