= Women's cinema =

Women role-related cinema

Women's cinema primarily describes cinematic works directed (and optionally produced too) by women filmmakers. The works themselves do not have to be stories specifically about women, and the target audience can be varied.

It is also a variety of topics bundled together to create the work of women in film. This can include women filling behind-the-scenes roles such as director, cinematographer, writer, and producer while also addressing the stories of women and character development through screenplays (on the other hand, films made by men about women are instead called Woman's film).

Renowned female directors include Alice Guy-Blaché, film pioneer and one of the first film directors, Agnès Varda, the first French New Wave director, Margot Benacerraf, the first woman to win the Cannes International Critics Prize in 1959 and be nominated for the Palme D'Or, Yulia Solntseva, the first woman to win the Best Director Award at Cannes Film Festival (1961), Lina Wertmüller, the first woman nominated for the Academy Award for Best Director (1977), Barbra Streisand, the first woman to win the Golden Globe Award for Best Director (1983), Jane Campion, the first woman to win the Palme D'Or at Cannes Film Festival (1993), and Kathryn Bigelow, the first woman to win the Academy Award for Best Director (2009), along with many other female directors from around the world such as Dorothy Arzner, Ida Lupino, Lois Weber, Leni Riefenstahl, Mary Harron, Sofia Coppola, Kira Muratova, Claire Denis, Chantal Akerman, Catherine Breillat, Aparna Sen, Lucrecia Martel, Lynne Ramsay, Céline Sciamma, Claudia Weill, and Julie Dash. Many successful cinematographers are also women, including Margarita Pilikhina, Maryse Alberti, Reed Morano, Rachel Morrison, Halyna Hutchins, Autumn Durald Arkapaw, and Zoe White.

Women's cinema recognizes women's contributions all over the world, not only to narrative films but to documentaries as well. Recognizing the work of women occurs through various festivals and awards, such as the Cannes Film Festival, for example.

"Women's cinema is a complex, critical, theoretical, and institutional construction," Alison Butler explains. The concept has had its fair share of criticisms, causing some female filmmakers to distance themselves from it in fear of being associated with marginalization and ideological controversy.

== Famous women in film history ==
=== Silent films ===
Alice Guy-Blaché was a film pioneer and the first female director. Working for Gaumont in France at the time that the cinema was being invented, she created La Fée aux Choux (1896). The dates of many early films are speculative, but La Fée aux Choux may well be the first narrative film ever released. She served as Gaumont's head of production from 1896 to 1906 and ultimately produced hundreds of silent films in France and the United States.

In Sweden, Anna Hofman-Uddgren was that country's first female film maker—producing the silent film Stockholmsfrestelser in 1911. She also acted in the film. However, Ebba Lindkvist directed the short drama, Värmländingarna, which premièred in Sweden on 27 October 1910, thus technically making her the first woman film maker, and chronologically, the second ever female feature film director in the world, after Alice Guy-Blaché.

Luise Fleck was an Austrian film director, and has been considered the second ever female feature film director in the world, after Alice Guy-Blaché. In 1911 Luise Fleck directed Die Glückspuppe.

Elvira Notari is the first Italian woman director to make a film. Notari's first films are Maria Rosa di Santa Flavia, Carmela la pazza, Bufera d'anime, all made in 1911.

Helen Gardner, a Vitagraph Studios player who had won acclaim for her portrayal of Becky Sharp in the 1910 version of Vanity Fair, was the first film actor, male or female, to form her own production company, The Helen Gardner Picture Players. Gardner's first production was Cleopatra (1912), one of the first American full-length films.

In 1913 Russian filmmaker Olga Preobrazhenskaya began directing films in the "Timan and Reingardt" studio. She is the first Russian woman director. Her first work as a director was the 1916 film Miss Peasant based on the work of the same name by Aleksandr Pushkin.

American-born director, Lois Weber was coached and inspired by Guy-Blaché and found success in creating silent films. Weber is well known for her films Hypocrites (1915), The Blot (1921), and Suspense (1913). Weber's films often focus on difficult social issues. For instance, her film Where Are My Children? (1916) addresses the controversial issues of birth control and abortion. And she questioned the validity of capital punishment in The People vs. John Doe (1916).

Mabel Normand was another significant early female filmmaker. She started as an actress and became a producer-writer-director in the 1910s, working on the first shorts Charlie Chaplin did as The Tramp at Mack Sennett's Keystone Studios. She further collaborated with Sennett on other Keystone films and, during the late 1910s and early 1920s, she had her own movie studio and production company. Other notable actresses who became directors include Grace Cunard and Nell Shipman. The first documented Asian woman director, producer and actress is Marion E. Wong, who created the Mandarin Film Company in 1916. She wrote, directed, produced and acted in The Curse of Quon Guon.

Women screenwriters were highly sought after in the early years of the cinema. Frances Marion, Anita Loos, and June Mathis all had successful careers in the silent and early-sound eras. Mathis was also the first female executive in Hollywood.

See Mary Pickford.

=== Classical Hollywood ===
As the American cinema became a highly commercialized industry in the 1920s and its content became more and more conventionalized, the opportunities for women producers and directors became fewer and fewer. By the time sound arrived in the US in 1927 and the years immediately after, women's roles behind the camera were largely limited to scriptwriters, costume designers, set decorators, make-up artists, and the like. And the industry's implementation of self-censorship in the form of the Hays Code in 1934 meant that topics such as birth control and abortion were taboo. Dorothy Arzner was the only woman director to survive in this unfriendly environment. She did so by producing well made but formally rather conventional films. Nevertheless, it is possible to trace feminist elements in her films. Film critics find her film, Dance, Girl, Dance, about two women struggling to make it in show business, to be particularly interesting from a feminist perspective. When the film was selected for inclusion in the National Film Registry, it was noted that "The dancers, played by Maureen O'Hara and Lucille Ball, strive to preserve their own feminist integrity, while fighting for their place in the spotlight and for the love of male lead Louis Hayward." Beyond Dance, Girl, Dance, Arzner also worked with some of Hollywood's most formidable actresses—including Katharine Hepburn in Christopher Strong (1933) and Joan Crawford in The Bride Wore Red (1937).

First woman to direct a film noir, Ida Lupino, is widely regarded as the most prominent female filmmaker working in the 1950s during the Hollywood studio system. She is best known for directing The Hitch-Hiker. Ida Lupino is also famous for her work as an actress.

=== Experimental and avant-garde cinema ===
The experimental and avant-garde cinema is the genre considered to be closer to women filmmakers and one that also advances women themes. Annette Kuhn, for instance, noted such special affinity by citing that low investments of money and 'professionalism' have meant that it is more open than the mainstream film industry for women. Both Pam Cook and Laura Mulvey also noted an alignment and alliance of experimental and avant-garde cinema with feminist interest and feminist politics. Specifically, Mulvey explained that mainstream or Hollywood films are unable to provide the experience of contradiction, reinforcing anti-realism and, this is where the avant-garde cinema is useful for women and feminism because they share "a common interest in the politics of images and problems of aesthetic language."

Women's involvement in the experimental and avant-garde cinema started in the early twentieth century, although it was limited due to the constraints of the social conventions of this period. It was only after the war when women became actively involved in this cinematic genre. Germaine Dulac was a leading member of the French avant-garde film movement after World War I. There is also the case of Maya Deren's visionary films, which belonged to the classics of experimental cinema and focused on the North-American avant-garde. The contemporaneous trend did not oppose the female filmmakers' entry into avant-garde filmmaking although, in its early years, they did not receive as much critical acclaim as their male counterparts.

Shirley Clarke was a leading figure of the independent American film scene in New York in the fifties. Her work is unusual, insofar as she directed outstanding experimental and feature films as well as documentaries. Joyce Wieland was a Canadian experimental film maker. The National Film Board of Canada allowed many women to produce non-commercial animation films. In Europe women artists like Valie Export were among the first to explore the artistic and political potential of videos. Her art works incited controversy due to sexual and feminist qualities.

== Impact on society ==
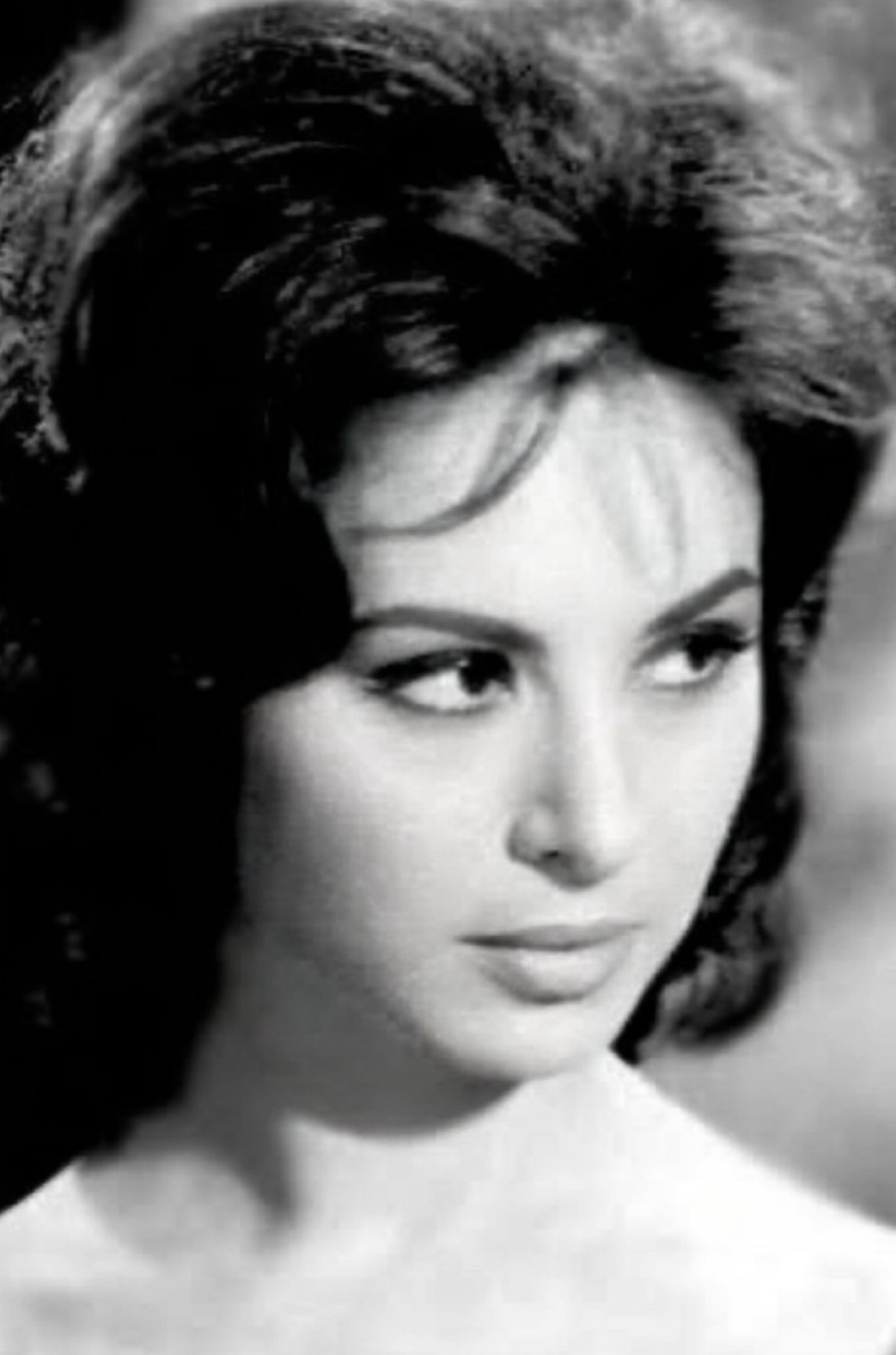
Faten Hamama (1931–2015), Egyptian film legend, inspired women all over the Middle East and Africa.

=== Impact of second-wave feminism ===
In the late sixties, when the second wave of feminism started, the New Left was at its height. Both movements strongly opposed the 'dominant cinema', i.e. Hollywood and male European bourgeois auteur cinema. Hollywood was accused of furthering oppression by disseminating sexist, racist and imperialist stereotypes. Women participated in mixed new collectives like Newsreel, but they also formed their own film groups. Early feminist films often focused on personal experiences.

Second-wave feminism would reveal itself in different forms in films in the latter part of the 20th century such as with the idea of "sisterhoods" in movies (however many of these movies were made by men). Other concepts of second-wave feminism in films involved women's oppression and the difficulty in identifying with the idea of femininity. During this time, feminism in movies would also be represented as a counter-cinema whereby filmmakers would attempt to intentionally deconstruct the model of the classical film. This style of feminist counter-cinema can be seen in the works of artists such as Sally Potter's Thriller in 1979.

=== Representing sexuality ===
Resisting the oppression of female sexuality was one of the core goals of second-wave feminism. Abortion was still very controversial in many western societies and feminists opposed the control of the state and the church. Exploring female sexuality took many forms: focusing on long-time censured forms of sexuality (lesbianism, sado-masochism) or showing heterosexuality from a woman's point of view. Liliana Cavani, Birgit Hein, Elfi Mikesch, Nelly Kaplan, Catherine Breillat and Barbara Hammer are some of the directors to be remembered.

A film notable for its empathic portrayal of sex work is Lizzie Borden's Working Girls (1986). Molly, a white lesbian in a stable mixed-race relationship, is a Yale-educated photographer who has chosen to augment her income through sex work in a low-key urban brothel. We accompany Molly on what turns out to be her last day on the job, understanding her professional interactions with her "johns" through her perspective, a completely original point of view, since, until Borden's film, sex workers had largely been depicted stereotypically. The story's sympathetic, well-rounded character and situation humanizes sex work, and the film itself combats the anti-pornography stance touted by many second-wave feminists, which Borden rejects as repressive.

Typically women are portrayed as dependent on other characters, overemotional, and confined to low status jobs when compared to enterprising and ambitious male characters (Bussey & Bandura, 1999). Women in cinema are grossly misrepresented and definitely under represented. The roles that men play are the superhero, the wealthy business man or the all-powerful villain. When it comes to the roles females play they tend to be the housewife, the woman who cannot obtain a man, the slut, or the secretary. The true comparison is masculinity versus femininity. The Bechdel test for film is a type of litmus test that examines the representation of women in media. The three factors tested are: 1. Are there at least two women in the film who have names? 2. Do those women talk to each other? 3. Do they talk to each other about something other than a man? (Sharma & Sender, 2014). Many roles that are given to women make them either dependent on the male counterpart or limits their role. Another characteristic of their role placement is that women are twice as likely to have a life-related role rather than a work-related role. Hollywood rarely chooses to have women be the all-powerful boss or to even have a successful career. There have been some examples that break this norm, such as The Proposal by Anne Fletcher. Even in these two films, the male counterpart is a strong role and in both the female lead is reliant on both actors for the storyline. Women do not stand on their own in movies and rarely are the center of attention without a male being there to steal the limelight. Some roles that have been portrayed in recent films have worked against this norm, such as Katniss in Hunger Games and Furiosa in Mad Max: Fury Road (both films are directed by men). These roles break the norm, as women typically are portrayed as dependent on other characters, overemotional, and confined to low-status jobs compared to enterprising and ambitious male characters (Bussey & Bandura, 1999). Women in cinema are grossly misrepresented and underrepresented.

=== Fear of entering cinematography ===
Many women fear(ed) even entering the film industry, let alone produce multiple pieces of work in the industry. It is said that both male and female workers believe hiring women into the industry is taking a big chance, or being risky. There are many discriminatory acts toward women during the hiring process into the industry such as age discrimination and providing them with lower pay rates. Most women workers in the film industry only become freelancers, which in most cases prevents them from creating careers and making a living out of their film/cinematography passion. These are the fear tactics in place, whether purposely or not, to prevent women from thriving in the film industry.

However, there is much more gendered discrimination towards women after they receive the job and actually begin to help and/or produce work. Statistics show that there are not many women in senior positions in the industry. Compared to the number of women hired, it is clearly shown that women are not given the chance to keep their jobs for long periods of time. "However, it is notable that women lost their jobs at a rate that was six times that of men, indicating the particular and heightened vulnerability of women in the industry." Women are not being promoted into higher positions as often as their male counterparts and are not even given the chance to stay long enough to get promoted. These are multiple issues happening during the hiring process and even the post-hire experiences of women which may make other women fear entering the industry in the first place.

The way women are treated in the workplace are also evidence of the inequalities against them in the film industry. Women's pay rates and expectations in their background/experience in cinematography is much different than male workers. There are many scenarios in the industry that displays the woman with more qualifications for the job than the man, yet earns less money for the same job than the man. "It is worth noting that women in this field are significantly better qualified than their male counterparts, with a greater proportion being graduates and an even more significant difference in the numbers of women, compared to men, with higher degrees (Skillset, 2010a: 6)." Even the women who are overqualified are treated as if they are not, resulting in them working extra hard to become better and be rewarded as their male counterparts. All of these inequalities and discrimination toward women in the film industry creates a fear for women to even want to enter the industry.

=== Statistics ===
==== United States ====
A study done by USC Annenberg in California researched what it meant to be a female in the film industry, no matter if they were working behind the scenes or were fictional characters. USC Annenberg looked at two test groups for films, the top 100 films every year from 2007 to 2015 and the top 100 films in 2015.

For the top 100 films in 2015, women were leads and co-leads in 32 of them, while of the 32 films, only 3 of them included a race other than Caucasian. Out of the thousands of speaking roles, only 32 characters were LGBT and of those characters, 40% of them were racially diverse. Female characters were also three times more likely to be seen in a sexual context.

Behind the scenes had similar statistics to the female fictional characters. Female directors, writers, and producers made up 19% of the 1,365 people that it took to create the top 100 films in 2015. The percentage of female writers (11.8%) and producers (22%) can be seen as high compared to female directors (7.5%). Of the 7.5% of female directors, three of them were African American and one was Asian American.

For the top 100 films every year from 2007 until 2015, of the 800 films, 4.1% were directed by females.

=== Documentaries ===
While there is still a gap between the percent of female and male filmmakers, women tend to be more involved in documentary films. There is a higher percentage of women directing documentaries than women directing narrative films. There came a point where female directors were barely noticed or not recognized at all.

==== Female filmmakers as feminists ====
In the film world, many female filmmakers are not given much attention or chances to show what they are capable of. This issue is still being debated on, but several activists aim to change and overcome this type of inequality. These activists aim to raise awareness and produce a social change to what is currently shown in the media. During the 1990s, many films came about presenting female filmmakers from different nationalities and racial groups. For example, one of the films released that year is called Sisters in Cinema directed by Yvonne Welbon. This documentary was to demonstrate how African American female directors inspect their present spot in the business. By giving these female film directors the opportunity to showcase their work and demonstrate their actions then feminist documentaries will be as equally important to any other documentary. Not only this, but many documentaries tend to showcase different social activists who aim for a social change by raising awareness and reinforcing female film directors.

=== Celluloid ceiling ===
The Center of the Study of Women in Television and Film has dedicated 18 years to the study of women in the film industry. An annual report is created, discussing how women have contributed to as filmmakers. Most of the findings from the research shows that, statistically, it says the same from year to year. The highest earning movies of the past 20 years, with the exception of foreign films and reissues, have been monitored and studied by the Celluloid Ceiling to provide information on the contributions and employment of women on these films. According to the Center for the Study of Women in Television and Film at San Diego State University, as of 2017, "women comprised 18% of all directors, writers, producers, executive producers, editors, and cinematographers working on the top 250 domestic grossing films." The same study concluded that in 2017, 10 or more women were given one of these positions in 1% of films, compared to 10 or more men being hired for these jobs in 70% of films. Information from the Celluloid Ceiling shows that more women tend to be employed on film projects directed by women. According to the Duke Journal of Gender Law and Policy, "in films with at least one female director, women comprised 53% of writers. Conversely, in films with male directors, women comprised just 10% of writers." Statistically, female directors generally create films about and for women, and hire women to assume the roles of main characters or protagonists. The Duke Journal of Gender Law and Policy additionally found that "in 2015, women comprised only 22% of protagonists and 18% of antagonists. Just 34% of major characters and 33% of all speaking characters in the top 100 domestic grossing films were women."

The group also contributes their time to creating articles discussing how women are viewed in film, not only as filmmakers but as fictional characters as well.

== North America ==
=== Canada ===
Mary Harron is a famous woman director from Canada who is active in Hollywood. She first gained recognition with the film I Shot Andy Warhol which premiered at the 1996 Cannes Film Festival. She also directed American Psycho (2000) and The Notorious Bettie Page (2005).

Joyce Wieland is a notable Canadian experimental filmmaker and mixed media artist. She was active from 1950s until 1980s as a filmmaker. In recent years the actress-turned filmmaker Sarah Polley has made several notable films. In 2022, she wrote and directed the film Women Talking, based on the 2018 novel of the same name by Miriam Toews, for which she won the Academy Award for Best Adapted Screenplay.

=== United States ===
==== Hollywood ====
===== Silent era =====
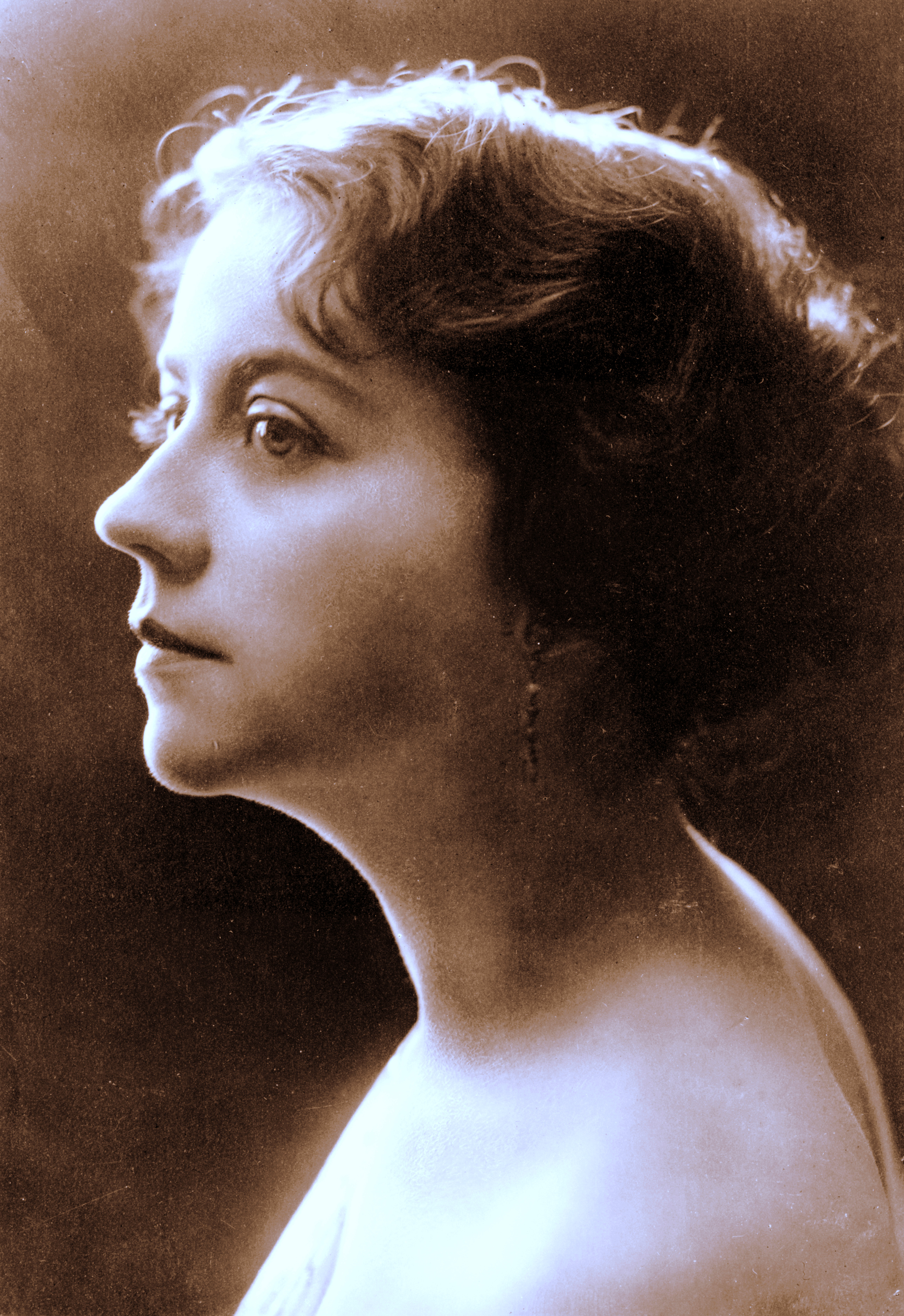
American film director and actress Helen Gardner was the first film actor to found a production company.

Helen Gardner was the first film actor, to form her own production company, "The Helen Gardner Picture Players". The 1912 film Cleopatra was the first film by the company, which Helen Gardner produced and starred in.

American director, Lois Weber is one of the most prolific film directors and producers of the silent era. Weber is well known for her films Hypocrites (1915), The Blot (1921), and Suspense (1913).

Mabel Normand was another notable female filmmaker during this era. She started as an actress and became a producer and director in the 1910s. During the late 1910s and early 1920s, she had her own movie studio and production company, "The Mabel Normand Feature Film Co." Other notable actresses who became directors include Grace Cunard and Nell Shipman.

==== 1940s-1950s ====
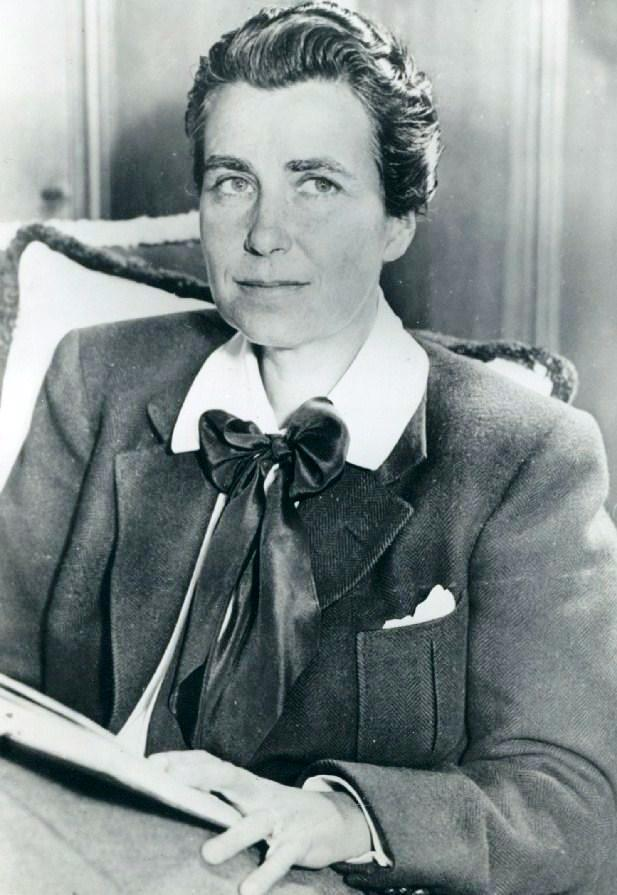
Film director Dorothy Arzner was one of the top directors of 1920s–1940s Hollywood.

Dorothy Arzner was one of the very few women in executive positions to be successful from 1920s until 1940s Hollywood. From 1927 until 1943, Arzner was the only woman director working in Hollywood.

First woman to direct a film noir, Ida Lupino, is widely regarded as the most prominent female filmmaker working in the 1950s during the Hollywood studio system. Besides directing, she was also an actress.

Ukrainian born American filmmaker Maya Deren directed groundbreaking avant-garde and experimental films in the 1940s including Meshes of the Afternoon (1943).

==== 1960s-1970s ====
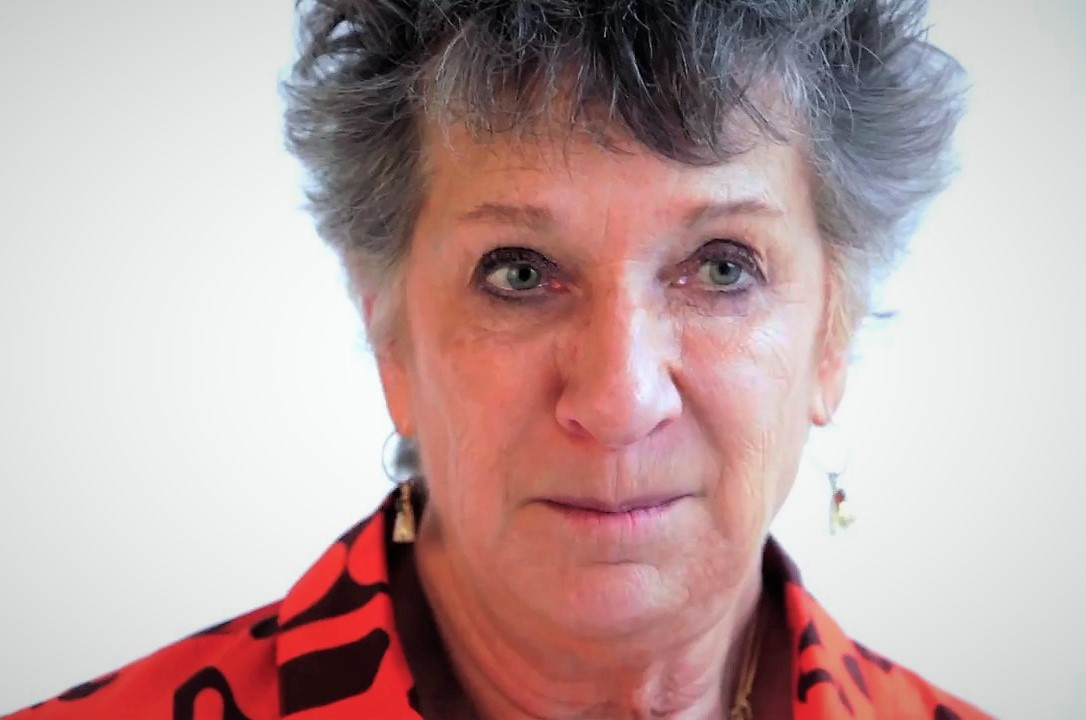
American film director Claudia Weill directed the critically acclaimed film Girlfriends in 1978.

Shirley Clarke was an independent filmmaker who shot three feature films in the 1960s — The Connection (1961), The Cool World (1964) and Portrait of Jason (1967).

The 1970 film Wanda by Barbara Loden is one of the most poignant portraits of alienation in cinema.

Joyce Chopra achieved success as a documentary and feature film director in the 1970s and 1980s. Her film Smooth Talk won the Grand Jury Prize in the Dramatic category at the 1986 Sundance Festival. She also collaborated with director Claudia Weill on her documentary film Joyce at 34 which documented her giving birth.

Critically acclaimed 1978 film Girlfriends by Claudia Weill is a highlight of 1970s women's cinema. In 2019, the film was selected for preservation in the United States National Film Registry by the Library of Congress as being "culturally, historically, or aesthetically significant". Due to workplace sexual harassment from producer Ray Stark on the set of her follow-up film It's My Turn (1980), Weill stopped making feature films.

Elaine May, Joan Darling, Joan Tewkesbury, Joan Micklin Silver, Karen Arthur and Martha Coolidge are some other notable 1970s film directors.

==== 1980s-2000s ====
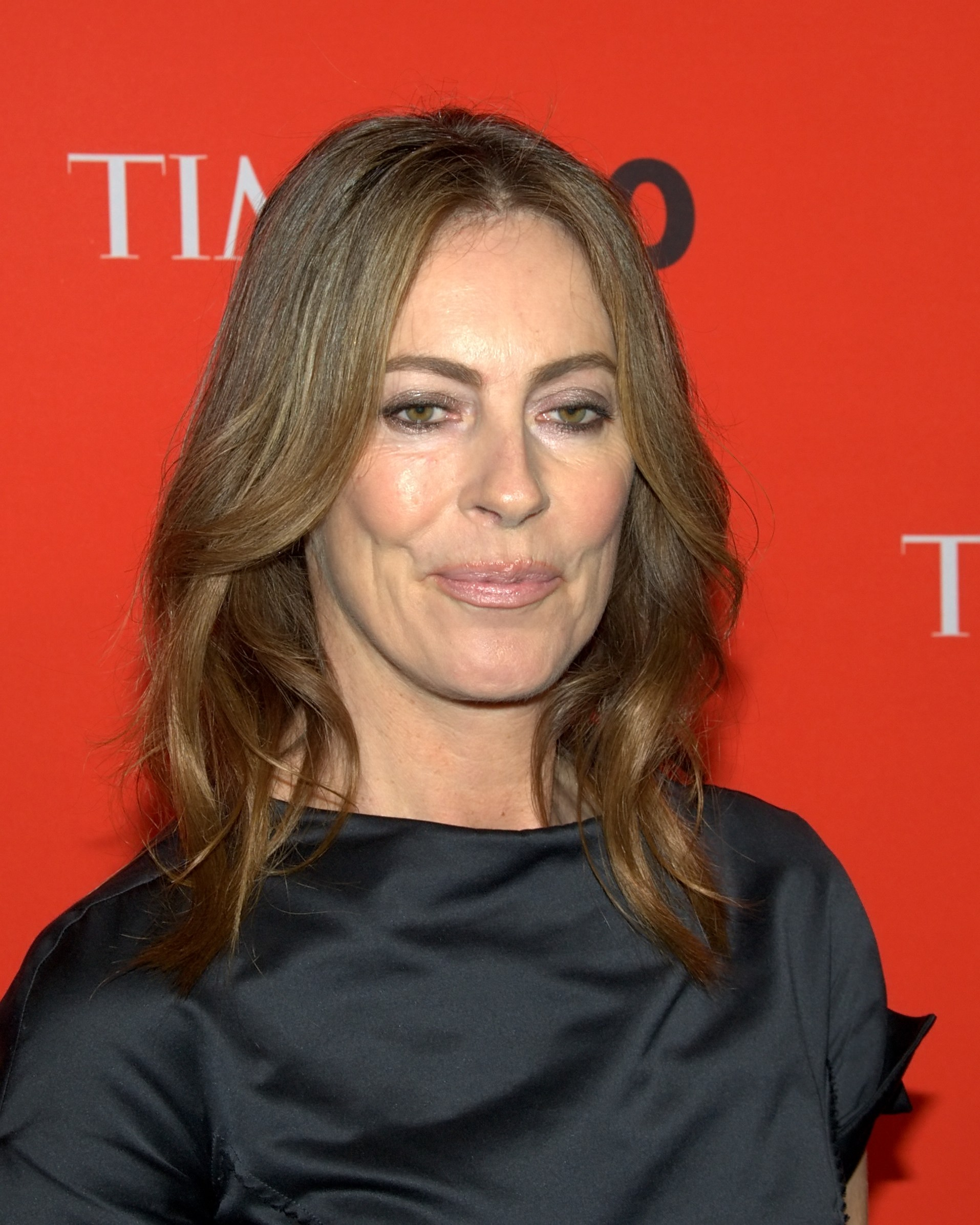
Kathryn Bigelow was the first woman to win an Academy Award for directing in 2010.

Barbra Streisand, best known as an actress and singer, directed the film Yentl in 1983, thus becoming the first woman to write, produce, direct, and star in a major studio film. She was the first woman to win the Golden Globe Award for Best Director in 1983.

Film director Julie Dash achieved great commercial and critical success with her 1991 hit film Daughters of the Dust which was an award winner at the Sundance Film Festival. In 2004, the film was selected for preservation in the United States National Film Registry by the Library of Congress as being "culturally, historically, or aesthetically significant."

Kathryn Bigelow works in traditionally male-dominated genres like science fiction, action and horror. Her directorial debut was the 1981 biker drama The Loveless. She became the first woman to win an Academy Award for Best Director and the Directors Guild of America Award in 2010 for The Hurt Locker. In 2013, her film Zero Dark Thirty was met with universal acclaim and grossed $95 million in the United States box office. Bigelow went on to be nominated for Best Director at the BAFTA Awards, Golden Globe Awards and Directors Guild of America Award among others. However, she failed to be shortlisted for the category at the 85th Academy Awards in what was widely seen as a snub.

Lizzie Borden is a notable 1980s feminist filmmaker who made films on controversial topics, including sex-work. Some of her notable films include Born in Flames (1983) and Working Girls (1986).

==== 2000s-present ====
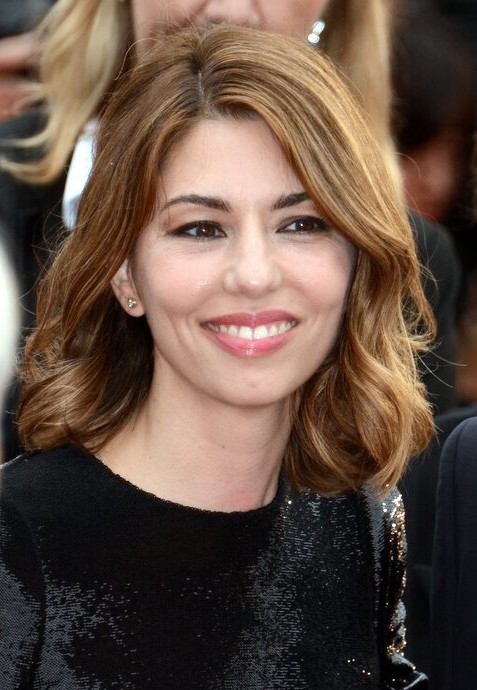
Film director Sofia Coppola became the second woman at the Cannes Film Festival to win the Best Director award in 2017.

In the 2000s women directed films made in Hollywood have started making more money than ever, with highest grossing films getting 100 million or even up to billion dollar grosses.

Anne Fletcher has directed seven studio-financed films: Step Up (2006), 27 Dresses (2008), The Proposal (2009) The Guilt Trip (2012), Hot Pursuit (2015), Dumplin' (2018), and Hocus Pocus 2 (2022) which have gone on to gross over $343 million at the US box office and $632 million worldwide.

Catherine Hardwicke's films have grossed a cumulative total of $551.8 million. Her most successful films are Twilight (2008) and Red Riding Hood (2011).

Nancy Meyers has enjoyed success with her five features: The Parent Trap (1998), What Women Want (2000), Something's Gotta Give (2003), The Holiday (2006) and It's Complicated (2009) which have amassed $1,157 million worldwide. Before she started her directorial career she wrote some other successful films like Private Benjamin (1980) for which she was nominated for the Academy Award for Best Original Screenplay, Baby Boom (1987) or Father of the Bride (1991).

Sofia Coppola is a critically acclaimed director who has also had financial success. Her directorial debut film Lost in Translation (2003) grossed over $119 million. The Virgin Suicides (1999), Marie Antoinette (2006) and The Bling Ring (2013) were also successful. At the 2017 Cannes Film Festival, Sophia Coppola won the Best Director award for her work on the drama film The Beguiled, becoming the second woman in the festival's history to win the award. Her niece Gia Coppola is also a notable woman filmmaker.

Ava DuVernay is the director of the critically acclaimed Selma (2014) as well as the first African American woman to direct a triple-digit-budgeted film, A Wrinkle in Time (2018).

Another notable modern director Greta Gerwig, has directed two films, Lady Bird (2017) and Little Women (2019), which both earned nominations for the Academy Award for Best Picture. Her third film, Barbie (2023), had the biggest opening weekend for a female director with $162 million at the box office.

Jennifer Lee, director of smash hits Frozen and Frozen II, is the first female director of a Walt Disney Animation Studios feature film and the first female director of a feature film that earned more than $1 billion in gross box office revenue.

Chloe Zhao is a Chinese born film director who is best known for her work in Hollywood. Zhao became the first Asian woman, the first woman of color and the second woman ever to win Best Director for her 2020 film Nomadland. In 2021 she directed the ensemble cast superhero film Eternals. She moved to Los Angeles from Beijing as a teenager. Her work is heavily censored in China.

Highest grossing women film directors whose films have earned more than 180 million dollars include Nancy Meyers, Elizabeth Banks, Catherine Hardwicke, Betty Thomas, Brenda Chapman, Vicky Jenson, Jennifer Lee, Patty Jenkins, Anna Boden — all of them are US Hollywood filmmakers.

=== African American women's cinema ===
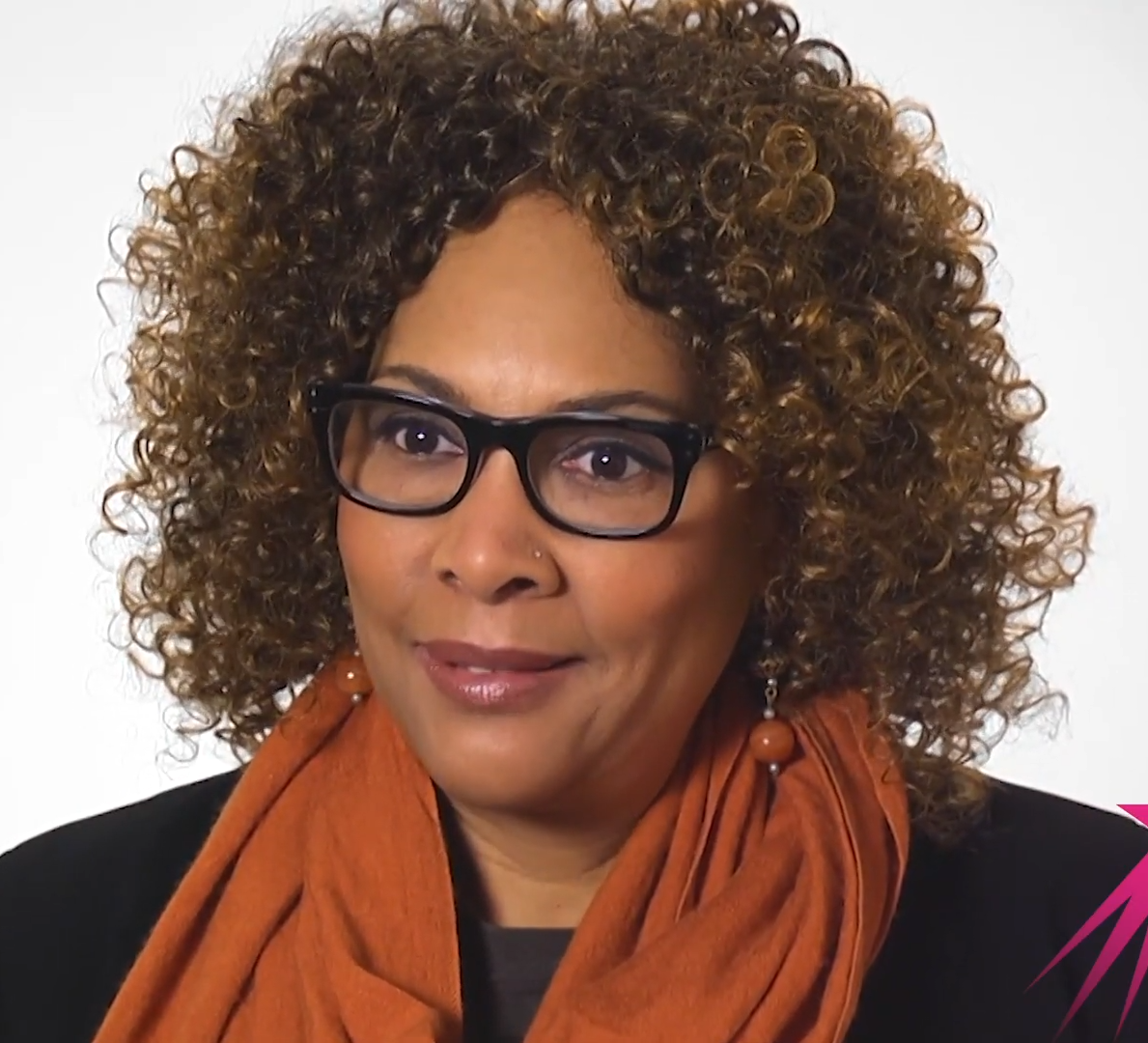
Film director Julie Dash was the first African-American woman to direct a full-length film that obtained general theatrical release in the United States

Julie Dash's Daughters of the Dust (1991) was the first full-length film with general theatrical release written and directed by an African American woman. Since then there have been several African or African-American women who have written, produced or directed films with national release. Neema Barnette (Civil Brand), Maya Angelou (Down in the Delta), Kasi Lemmons (Eve's Bayou), Cheryl Dunye (My Baby's Daddy), Stephanie Allain (Biker Boyz), Tracey Edmonds (Soul Food), Frances-Anne Solomon (A Winter Tale) and Dianne Houston (City of Angels), Leslie Harris (Just Another Girl on the IRT) are among these filmmakers. In 1994 Darnell Martin became the first African American woman to write and direct a film produced by a major studio when Columbia Pictures backed I Like It Like That.

To date, Nnegest Likké is the first African American woman to write, direct and act in a full-length movie released by a major studio, Phat Girlz (2006) starring Jimmy Jean-Louis and Mo'Nique.

For a much fuller accounting of the larger history of black women filmmakers, see Yvonne Welbon's 62-minute documentary Sisters in Cinema (2003).

Furthermore, since the revolutionary start of filmmaking, black women filmmakers have continuously struggled and are still struggling to showcase their work on feature films in Hollywood. However, that does not exclude the fact that there were various black women filmmakers who sparked during their time and age because of their phenomenal work behind the scenes. Jessie Maple is considered to be one of the most recognized figure for the civil rights of the African American community and women of color within the film industry. Her film career took off when she first worked as a film editor for the crime drama film Shaft's Big Score (1972) and The Super Cops (1974) which was based on a book. She continued to work as a film editor for several years but eventually became the only black union cameraperson in her time in New York. With her devoted passion for film and activism growing by the day, Maple and her husband, Leroy Patton, created LJ Film productions, Inc. and when on about to produce several short documentaries within the border and context of black representation, such as Black Economic Power: Reality or Fantasy? (1977). Her two major works, Will (1988) and Twice as Nice (1988), were the first ever independent feature films to be solely created and directed by an African American woman.

Alile Sharon Larkin is known as a film director, producer, and writer. She began her film career while earning her master's degree in UCLA in film and television production. One of her first films called Your Children Come Back to You (1979) depicts the ongoing dilemma that a young African American girl faces while choosing between her aunt's desire to take in a European lifestyle while her mother is strictly intact with her African roots and culture. Larkin's second film feature A Different Image (1982) gained her popular recognition and praise, and eventually won a first-place prize from the Black American Cinema Society. Her ongoing success in the film industry gave her the potential and opportunity to form her own production studio in order to create and enhance educational videos and television for young children.Dreadlocks and the Three Bears (1992) and Mz Medusa (1998) are some of the productions produced in her studio during the 1990s.

== Africa ==
The Cameroonian journalist Thérèse Sita-Bella directed a 1963 documentary, Tam-Tam à Paris, and Sarah Maldoror, a French filmmaker of Guadeloupean descent, shot the feature-film Sambizanga in Angola in 1972. But the first African woman film director to gain international recognition was the Senegalese ethnologist Safi Faye with a film about the village in which she was born (Letter from the Village, 1975). The 1989 Créteil International Women's Film Festival included short films by Leonie Yangba Zowe of the Central African Republic (Yangba-Bola and Lengue, 1985) and Flora M'mbugu-Schelling of Tanzania. Other African women filmmakers include Anne Mungai, Fanta Régina Nacro (The Night of Truth, 2004), Tsitsi Dangarembga (Mother's Day, 2004) and Marguerite Abouet, an Ivorian graphic novel writer who co-directed an animated film based on her graphic novel: Aya de Yopougon (2012). The most successful film in the history of Nollywood, The Wedding Party, was directed by Kemi Adetiba in 2016.

Cameroonian-Belgian Rosine Mbakam, who directed two feature-length documentaries, The Two Faces of a Bamiléké Woman (2016) and Chez Jolie Coiffure (2018), has been described as "one of the foremost filmmakers of creative nonfiction working right now."

== Asia ==
=== India ===
The Indian film industry has been an ongoing success since the revolutionary start of their musicals and romantic family dramas. Majority of these popular "Masala" films are usually directed by men. Female roles in the filmmaking industry were solely restricted to acting, singing and dancing. However, recently women have stepped up and took the lead as successful directors, producing films mainly revolving around female issues within society. Like majority of women around the world, Women in India have been struggling to prove their point. Films made by women were usually categorized as art films or films of the parallel cinema. Indian women filmmakers could not have full access to funds and film publicity like male filmmakers did. Mainstream cinema in India basically consists of the "Masala Movies", which includes several genres such as comedy, action, revenge, tragedy, romance combined to create an entire film. Women continuously face struggles with attempting to get a fraction of the millions of dollars spend of these masala films. This forces women to drift away from the masala genre in order to get some recognition, which can often cause controversies and raises suspicion.

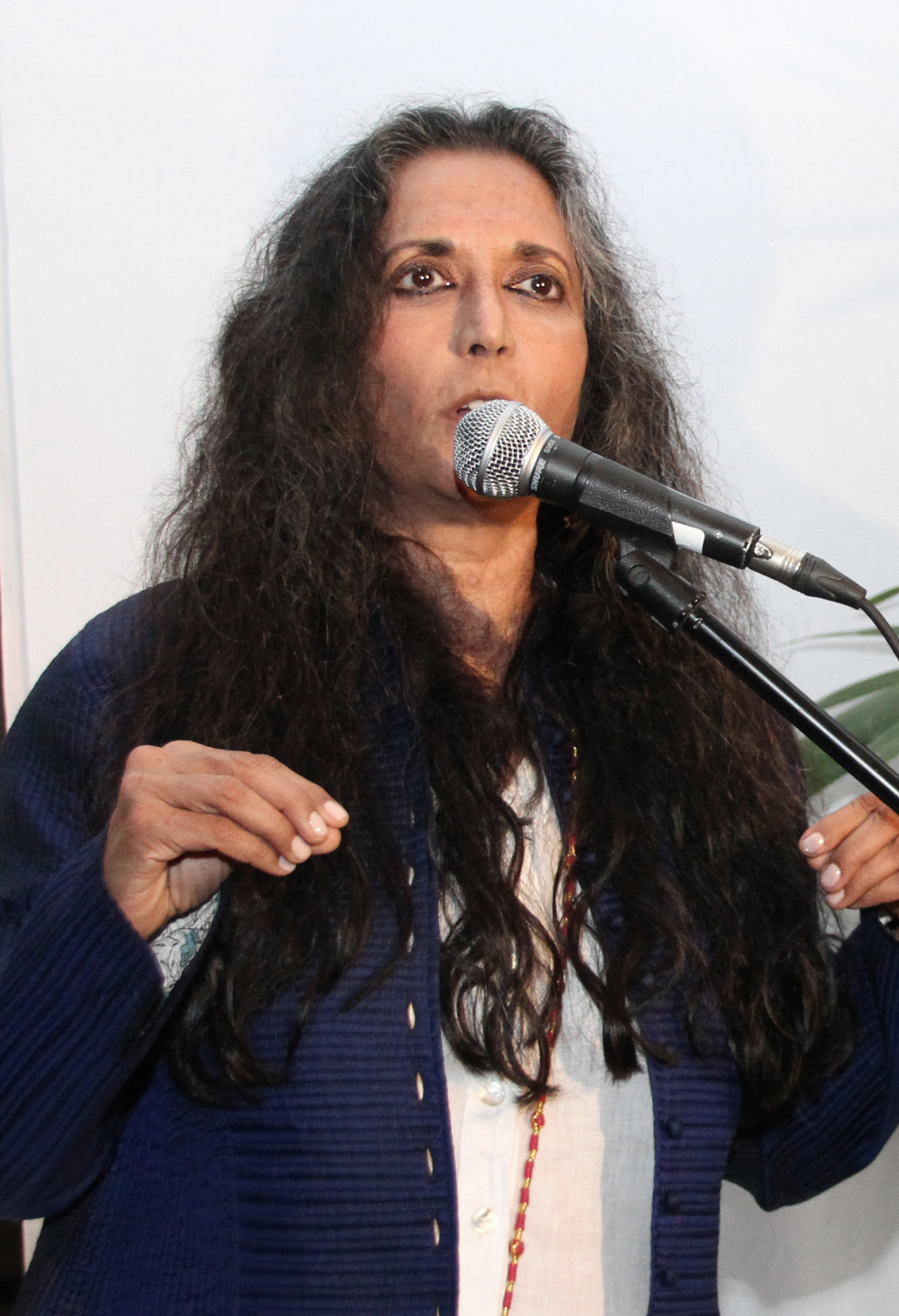
Deepa Mehta is a filmmaker of Indian origin active in Canada.

A number of well-known Indian female filmmakers have achieved astounding commercial success from their films, including Mira Nair (active in America), Aparna Sen, Deepa Mehta (active in Canada), Gurinder Chadha (active in the UK), and Manju Borah. However, there are a number of other Indian women filmmakers, whose works both entertain and address a range of social and political issues. Other noteworthy Indian women filmmakers include Vijaya Nirmala, Nisha Ganatra, Sonali Gulati, Indu Krishnan, Eisha Marjara, Pratibha PJaaparmar, Nandini Sikand, Ish Amitoj Kaur, Harpreet Kaur, Leena Manimekalai and Shashwati Talukdar, Rima Das.

Deepa Mehta is a transnational filmmaker whose work in film is recognized internationally at the highest levels. She is mainly active in Canada since 1973. Her moving films have been played at almost every major film festival. She produced the film Heaven on Earth, in 2008, which premiered at the Toronto International Film Festival. Since its release, the film has turned into a useful tool for professionals who specialize in assisting abused women, specifically looking at the circumstances of immigrant women in abusive environments, as it has been screened at conferences of crown attorneys, judges and healthcare workers in order to help them better understand these women's situations. Fire is a story of two sisters in law who go against their traditions and culture aiming to begin a new life together. When the movie was first screened in Bombay, it caused a backlash by a few political parties such as the Shiv Sena. Majority of the theaters stopped screening the film because of the violent mob attacks which caused serious damage to the theatre hall and property. The attackers did not want the film to be screened because it went against their beliefs and was a violation to "Indian culture". The Indian society is still not equipped to understand and accept gay and lesbian relationships into their community. On the other hand, there are some who praised Mehta's film for showcasing social issues India was facing.

Some of her other well-known works include her elemental trilogy: Earth (1996), Fire (1998), Water (2005), where dominant masculine values and practices of oppression and exploitation of women are challenged in this compelling three part series. Mehta's film Earth (1998) was inspired from Bapsi Sidhwa's "Cracking India", which was a story revolving the India-Pakistan Partition of 1947 and had a successful outcome. Mehta began working on her last film, Water (2005), in her trilogy. The movie was set in the 1930s when India was fighting for independence against the British colonial rule. The film portrays a group of widows who struggle with poverty in the city of Varanasi. It also looks at the dynamic between one of the widows, who aims to be free from the social restrictions forced upon widows and a man who is from a lower social class and is a follower of Mahatma Gandhi. Feminist social issues are highlighted, such as the mistreatment of widows, religious misogyny, and child brides in rural parts of India. Mehta was forced to stop the film production because of the political party of Hindu extremists in relation to Bharatiya Janatha Party (BJP), responded by stating that the film tarnishes India's image and was associated in organizing attempt by the Christian church to revolt against Hinduism. She received an Oscar Nomination for Water in 2007. Other notable films of hers are Bollywood/Hollywood (2002), and the adaptation of Midnight's Children (2012).

Mira Nair, an accomplished Indian filmmaker, has written, produced and directed a plethora of documentaries. She is seen as a non-traditional filmmaker with an ability to provoke both Western and non-Western audiences. Her film So Far From India (1983) depicted the story of a young, working Indian immigrant in New York City and his harrowing experience of acculturation. While dealing with his own new struggles in America, he also has to worry about his pregnant wife back home. India Cabaret (1986), is a documentary-style film that lent a voice to strippers or cabaret dancers in Mumbai. She also has a list of feature films under her belt. Her debut feature film, Salaam Bombay! (1988), which detailed the urban devastation created by prostitution and poverty, was nominated for an Academy Award for Best Foreign Language Film in 1988, won the Prix du Publique for most popular entry at the Cannes Film Festival, the Camera D'Or for best first feature, as well as 25 other international awards.

Majority of female filmmakers in India try to change the film industry by bringing in real social issues, instead of the mainstream masala movies that India has been known for. Daman (2001) is directed by Lajma who decided to take on a unique yet distinct theme by raising awareness about marital rape. The leading actress won an award for her outstanding raw performance that revived Indian films that try to raise awareness regarding a serious social issue.

=== Lebanon ===
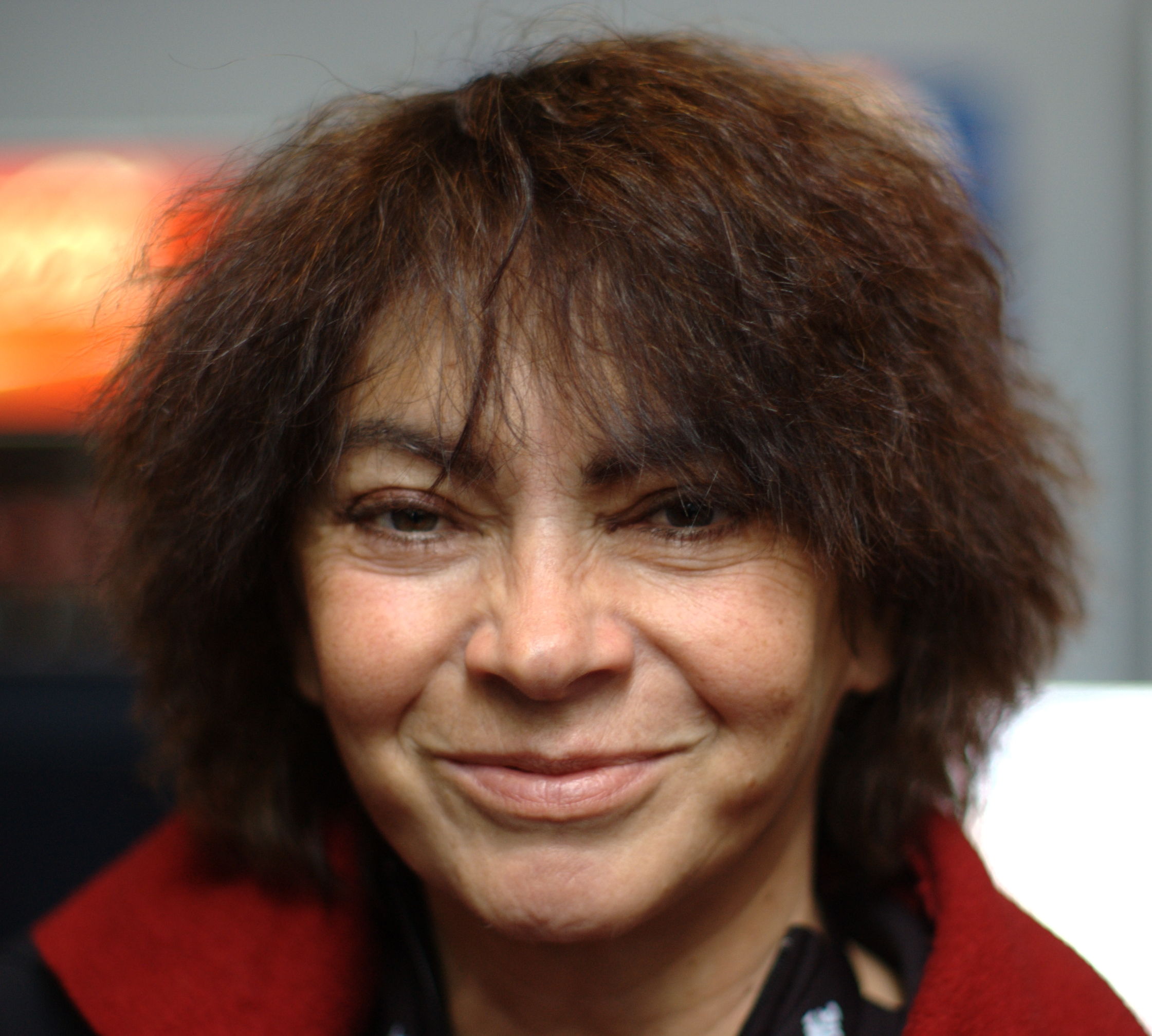
Lebanese film director Jocelyne Saab

Journalist and director Jocelyne Saab is considered to be a pioneer of Lebanese cinema. She began her career in the 1970s. She directed both documentary and fiction films.

Heiny Srour was the first Arab woman filmmaker to have her film, The Hour of Liberation Has Arrived, screened at the Cannes Film Festival in 1974.

Danielle Arbid is a Lebanese-French filmmaker whose work has been screened at the Cannes Film Festival. Her feature film debut was In the Battlefields (2004).

Nadine Labaki is a notable Lebanese film director. Her debut feature film Caramel premiered at the 2007 Cannes Film Festival.

Noura Kevorkian is an Armenian-Lebanese-Syrian writer-director-producer. She was born in Aleppo, Syria but grew up in Lebanon and is a Lebanese citizen. She studied Finance, Near and Middle Eastern Studies, and Cinema at the University of Toronto in Canada. Kevorkian is a filmmaker specializing in documentary and narrative genres for film and television. Her recent film BATATA won a Peabody Award, won the Best Feature Documentary (an Oscar-qualifying Tanit d'Or) at the Carthage Film Festival, the Human Rights Award at the Carthage Film Festival, the Amnesty Award at the Durban International Film Festival, the Audience Award TOP 10 Favourite Films at Hot Docs, and garnered three nominations in the 2023 Canadian Screen Awards.

=== Saudi Arabia ===
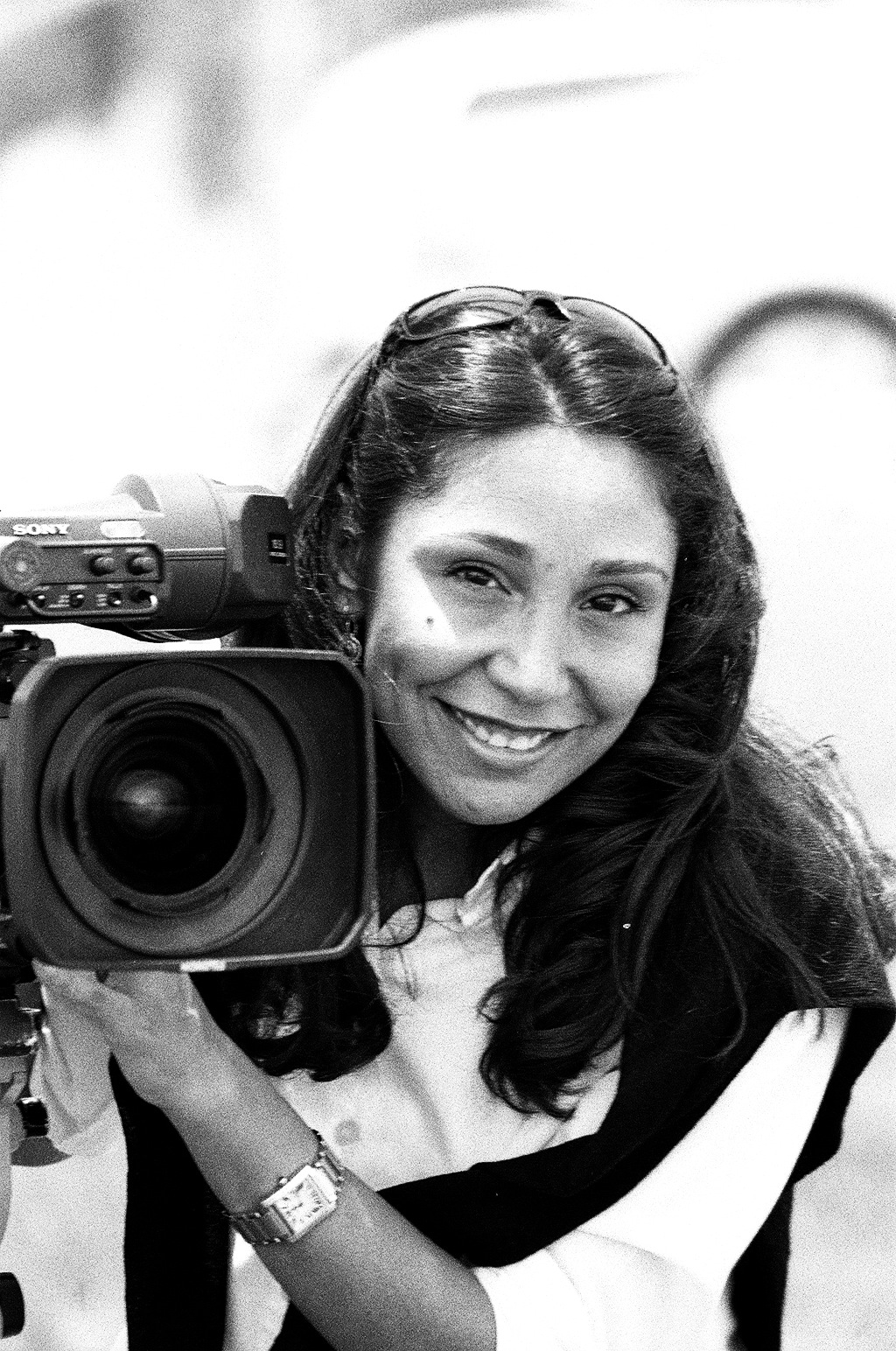
Haifa Al-Mansour is the first Saudi female filmmaker.

Haifa Al-Mansour is the first Saudi female filmmaker and is considered to be Saudi's most controversial film creator, especially after her iconic film that created a buzz Wadjda (2012). She completed her undergraduate studies in the American University in Cairo then continued to pursue her master's degree in film production from the University of Sydney in Australia. One of her three successful short films, Women Without Shadows, inspired hundreds of uprising Saudi filmmakers as well as raising questions towards the issue of publicly opening cinemas in Saudi. Her films have been both celebrated and criticized due to the fact that her work brings serious social topics Saudis are struggling with regarding their conservative culture and traditions.

In Wadjda, the main character, Waad Mohammed decides to go against social norms imposed on a ten-year-old girl in the kingdom. She becomes an outcast because of the bicycle she rides in public. However, the film ends on a light and inspiring note that frees Wadjda from all the social constraints set upon her. Haifa al Mansour reflects a portion of the Saudi society that refuses to accept the submissive traditional way of living. However, Wadjda promotes an amount of freedom for female rights that need more than an overnight change in such a conservative and restricted culture.

=== Japan ===
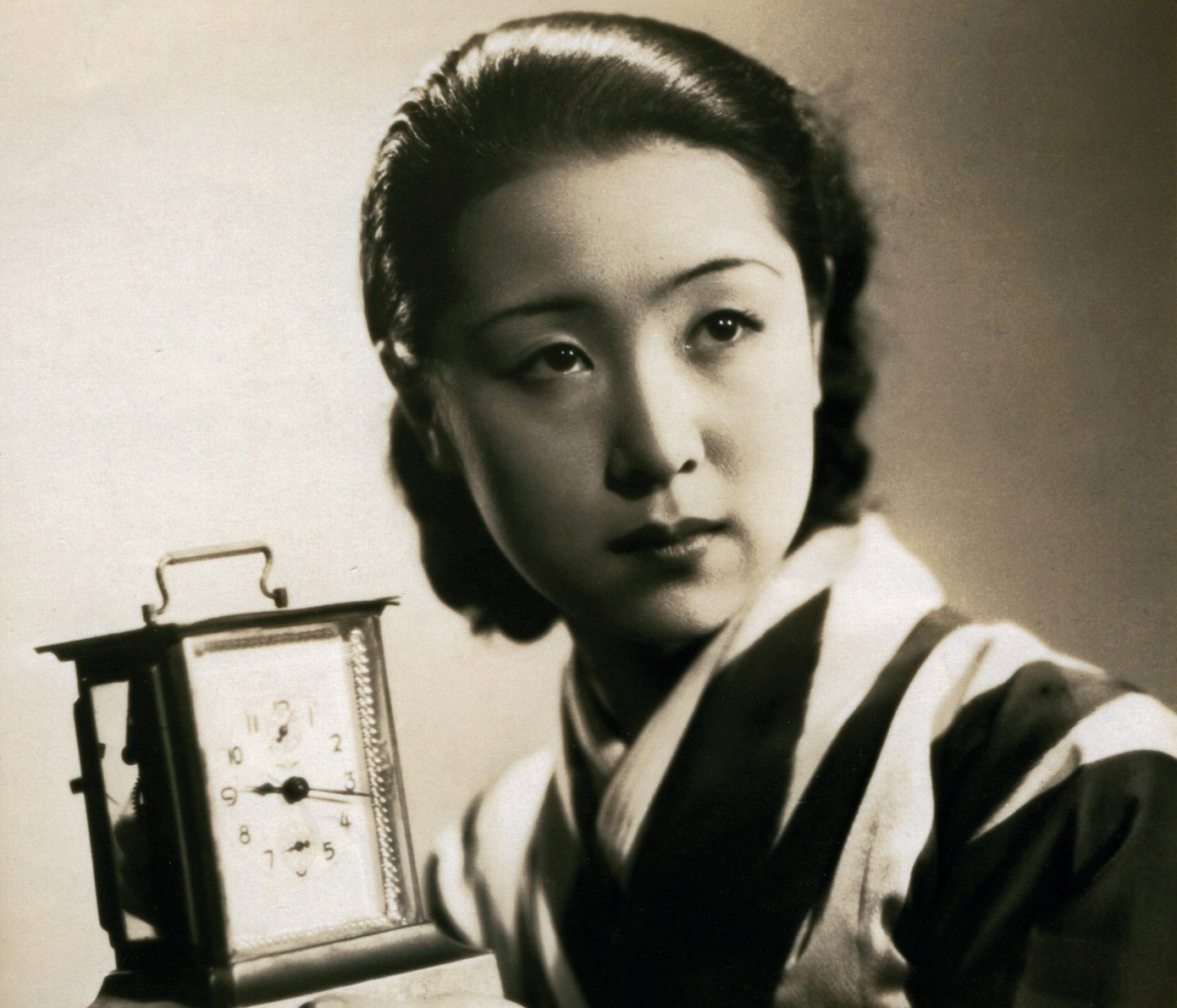
Japanese film director and actress Kinuyo Tanaka

In Japan for a long time Kinuyo Tanaka was the only woman to make feature films. As a director she was active in the 1950s and 1960s. She was able to do this against fierce resistance because she enjoyed a status as star actress.

Currently, the best-known women filmmaker of Japan may be Naomi Kawase; 2007 she won the Grand Prix in Cannes, while Memoirs of a Fig Tree, the directorial debut of well-known actress Kaori Momoi, was released in 2006. The sociocritical adventure film K-20: Legend of the Mask by Shimako Sato was her breakthrough into bigger budget cinema; it starred Takeshi Kaneshiro and was released all over the world.

=== South Korea ===
Similarly in South Korea, Yim Soon-rye landed a box-office-hit with Forever the Moment (2008), while So Yong Kim got some attention for her film In Between Days (2006) and Lee Suk-Gyung made the women-themed and subtly feminist The Day After.

=== China ===
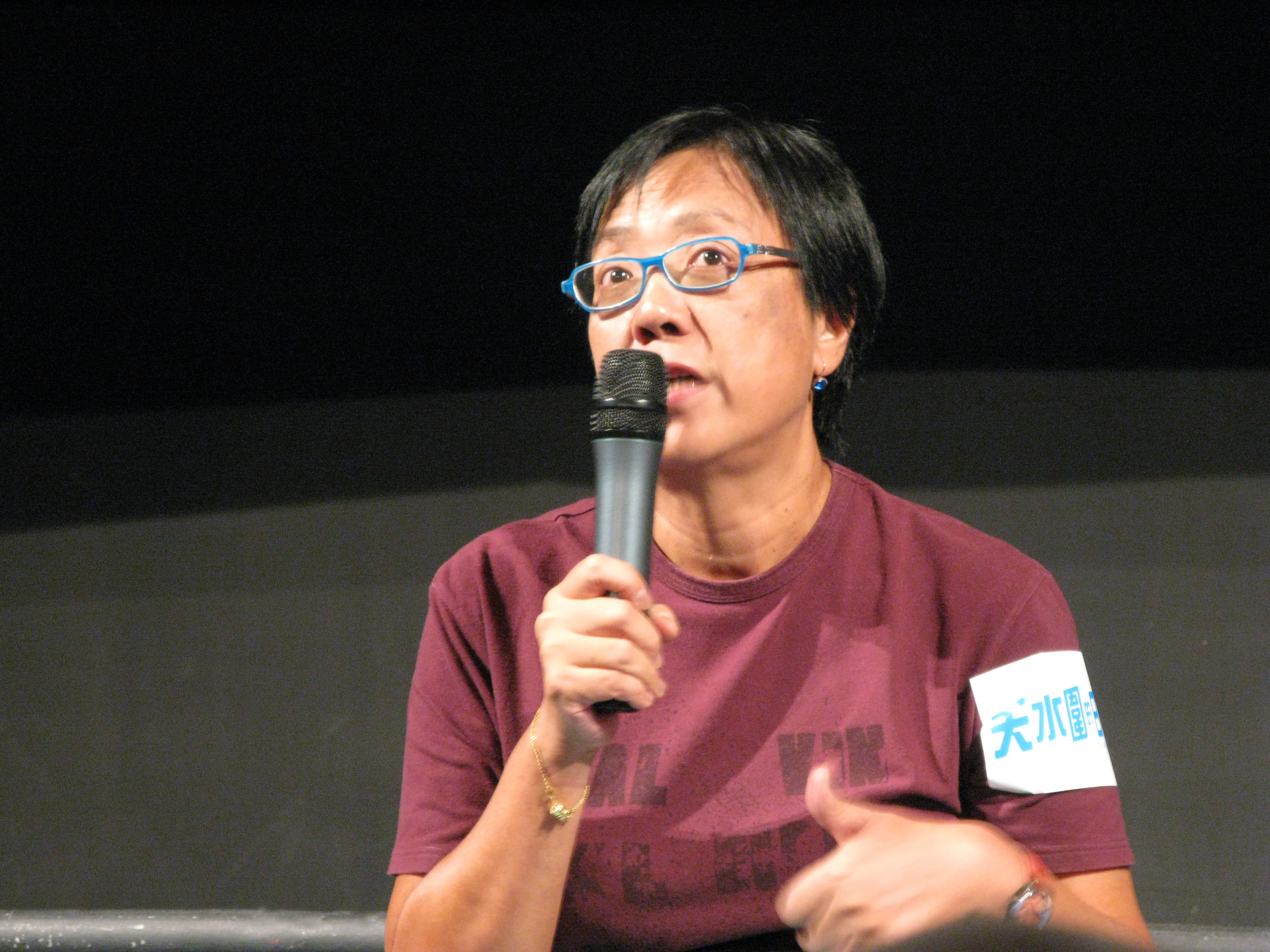
Chinese film director Anna Hui

One of the important fifth-generation filmmakers of China is Ning Ying, who won several prizes for her films; Ning Ying has gone on to realize small independent films with themes strongly linked to Chinese daily life, therefore also being a link between the 5th and 6th generation. The Sixth Generation has seen a growing number of women filmmakers such as Liu Jiayin, best known for her film Oxhide, and Xiaolu Guo; in 2001 Li Yu directed the first Chinese film which openly portrayed a lesbian relationship Fish and Elephant.

Famous woman filmmaker from Hong Kong Ann Hui has made a wide array of films ranging from the wuxia genre to drama; Ivy Ho and Taiwanese Sylvia Chang also are known names in the Hong Kong industry, while in Taiwan queer filmmaker Zero Chou has gotten acclaim on festivals around the world.

Lindan Hu has documented the post-Mao re-emergence of female desire in women's cinema of the 1980s in mainland China. The films Hu considers are Army Nurse directed by Hu Mei and Women on the Long March directed by Liu Miaomiao.

Chloe Zhao is a Chinese born Academy Award winning filmmaker who is currently active in Hollywood. She is best known for her 2020 film Nomadland. She moved to Los Angeles from Beijing as a teenager. Her work is heavily censored in China.

=== Malaysia ===
Yasmin Ahmad (1958–2009) is considered one of the most important directors of Malaysia; originally a commercial director, she switched to feature films relatively late and gained international acclaim while also stirring controversy among conservatives in her home country.

=== Pakistan ===
In Pakistan, where the film industry is not very big, some prominent directors are working. Conventional film industry has directors like Sangeeta and Shamim Ara who are making films with feminist themes. Especially to Sangeeta's credit there are some issue-based films. Now some new directors from television industry are also coming towards the medium of films. Sabiha Sumar and Mehreen Jabbar are two new names for films in Pakistan. Both of these directors have made films which are not only issue based addressing national issues but also these films have won international awards at different film festivals.

=== Iran ===
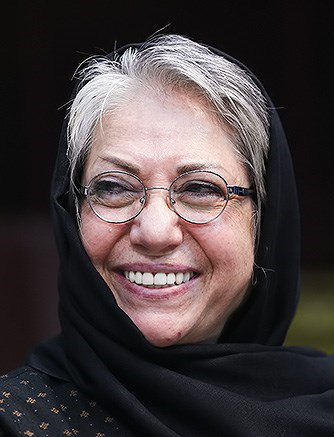
Prolific Iranian film director Rakhshan Bani-Etemad

Rakhshan Bani-Etemad, a writer and a director, is probably Iran's best known and certainly most prolific female filmmaker. She has established herself as the elder stateswoman of Iranian cinema with documentaries and films dealing with social pathology. Contemporary Iranian poet Forugh Farrokhzad (1935—1967) was also a filmmaker. Her best-known film is The House is Black (Khane siah ast, 1962), a documentary of a leper colony in the north of Iran. Samira Makhmalbaf directed her first film The Apple when she was only 17 years old and won Cannes Jury Prize in 2000 for her following film The Blackboard. Her stepmother Marzieh Meshkini made "The Day I Became a Woman" and Samira's sister Hana Makhmalbaf started her career with "The Joy of Madness", a behind-the-scenes documentary about Samira's film "At Five in the Afternoon", and has subsequently made two features, Buddha Collapsed out of Shame and "Green Days", a film about the Green Revolution that was banned in Iran.

=== Sri Lanka ===
Rukmani Devi and Florida Jayalath were groundbreaking figures in the early days of Sri Lankan cinema, transitioning from acclaimed actresses to trailblazing producers and directors Rukmani Devi notably starred in the inaugural Sri Lankan talkie, "Kadawunu Poronduwa" (1947), while Florida Jayalath began her acting journey with "Sengawunu Pilitura" (1951) before venturing into filmmaking. Following suit, veteran actress Ruby de Mel ventured into directing and producing with her debut film, "Pipena Kumudu" (1967), and Rohini Jayakody directed her first feature, "Hangi Hora" (1968). Despite their initial ventures into filmmaking, they later returned to their acting careers, refraining from further involvement in film production.

Sumitra Peries is a veteran film director in Sri Lankan cinema and she is the wife of Lester James Peries. She also held the post of Sri Lanka's ambassador to France, Spain and the United Nations in the late 1990s.

Inoka Sathyangani is an internationally acclaimed Sri Lankan film director and producer. In the year 2002, she received many number awards for her maiden effort Sulang Kirilli, which deals with the theme of abortion. The film secured the highest number of awards won by a single film in the history of Sri Lanka's film industry.

Anomma Rajakaruna is an award-wiining Sri Lankan film director. Rajakaruna's work has been recognized both locally and internationally, solidifying her place as a prominent figure in Sri Lankan cinema.

Sumathi Sivamohan is fiction and documnatary director.

== Latin America ==
=== Colombia ===
Marta Rodriguez is a Colombian documentary film maker who was active in the 1970s and 1980s.

=== Argentina ===
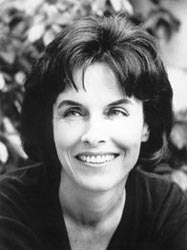
Maria Luisa Bemberg, a pioneer of Argentine feminist cinema

During the silent era of the 1910s and 1920s, several women in Argentina became filmmakers, something that would not happen for decades after the advent of sound films and the consolidation of the industry in the early 1930s. The most prolific Argentine woman filmmaker of the period arguably was Renée Oro who, unlike her peers, specialized in documentaries, a genre highly dominated by men. The first film directed by a woman was Un romance argentino (1915) by Angélica García de García Mansilla, financed by the Women's Commission of the San Fernando Hospital in Buenos Aires. The first female filmmakers in the country emerged through philanthropic organizations, a typical activity for women from the upper classes. These all-women institutions, known as sociedades de beneficencia (English: "societies of beneficence"), promoted festivals in which, in addition to showing the films, there were theatrical or musical numbers. Other pioneers include Emilia Saleny, Antonieta Capurro de Renauld, Elena Sansinena de Elizalde and María B. de Celestini, among others.

The first woman director of sound films in Argentina was Vlasta Lah, who directed Las furias (1960) and Las modelos (1963). Lah the only woman filmmaker in Latin America during the 1960s.

One of the most influential figures in the history of Argentine women's cinema was María Luisa Bemberg, . Her directorial debut was Momentos (1981), which was followed by Señora de nadie (1982). One of her most celebrated films was Camila (1984), which was nominated for the Academy Award for Best Foreign Language Film, marking the second time an Argentine film was nominated for this award.

Lucrecia Martel has been described as "arguably the most critically acclaimed auteur in Spanish-language art cinema outside Latin America". Her 2001 film La ciénaga was voted as the greatest film of Argentine cinema by a wide margin in a 2022 poll organized by the specialized magazines La vida útil, Taipei and La tierra quema, which presented at the Mar del Plata International Film Festival.

Lucia Puenzo is the other prominent contemporary Argentinean director. In addition, María Victoria Menis has written and directed several critically acclaimed films, including La cámara oscura (2008) and María y el araña (2013).

=== Brazil ===
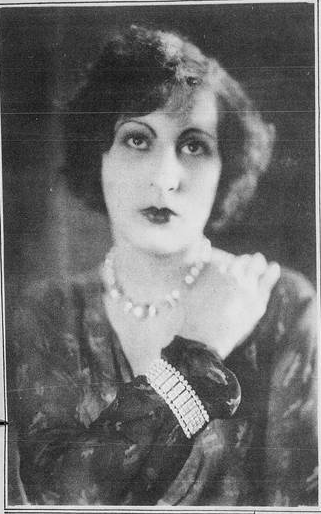
Cleo de Verberena, the first female film director of Brazil.

Brazilian cinema has a number of women directors whose works date from the 1930s.

Cléo de Verberena is the first woman director of Brazil. Her directorial debut was O Mistério do Dominó Preto in 1931.

Carmen Santos produced a wide variety of films through her production company starting from 1930 and had her directorial debut in 1948 with Minas Conspiracy.

Gilda de Abreu directed her first film O Ébrio in 1946.

Brazilian women directors' most prolific era unfolds from the 1970s. Some contemporary names include: Ana Carolina, Betse De Paula, Carla Camurati, Eliane Caffé, Helena Solberg, Lúcia Murat, Sandra Kogut, Suzana Amaral, Anna Muylaert, Petra Costa, Norma Bengell and Tata Amaral.

=== Mexico ===
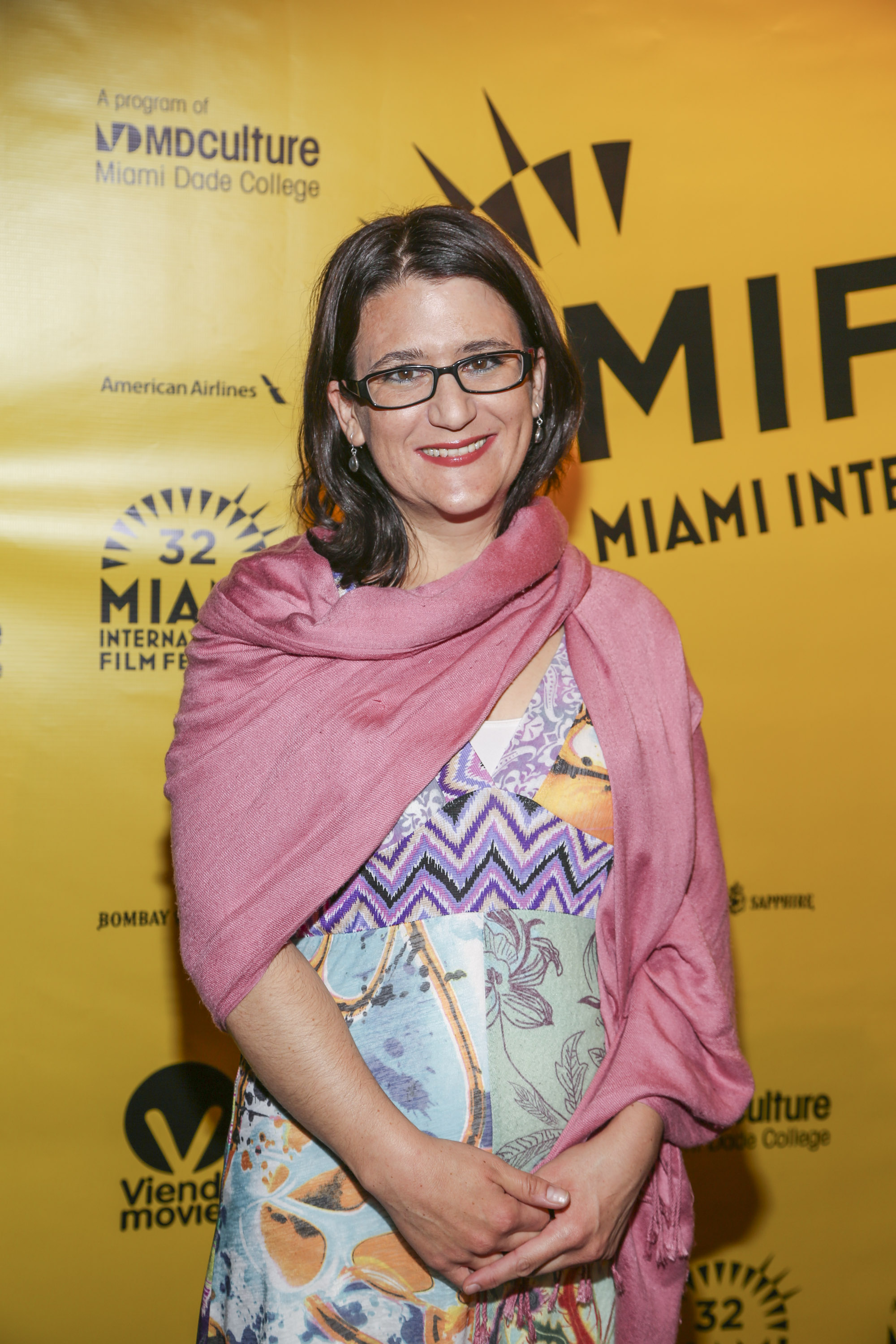
Mariana Chenillo, the first female director to win an Ariel Award for Best Picture in 2010

Women filmmakers in Latin America, specifically Mexico suffer from absolute neglect by the film industry and audience. Mimí Derba founded one of the first Mexican production companies, Azteca Films. She had a successful career in vaudeville before entering films. Derba was the first female director in Mexico. Then Matilde Landeta was a Mexican filmmaker and screenwriter, who was the first female to serve in those roles during the Golden Age of Mexican cinema. Her films focused on the portrayal of strong, realistic female protagonists in a patriarchal world. Landeta won an Ariel Award in 1957 for Best Original Story for the film El camino de la vida which she co-wrote with her brother Eduardo. The film also won the 1957 Golden Ariel, the Silver Ariel Film of Major National Interest and Best Direction and two other awards in 1956 in the Berlin International Film Festival under the name of Alfonso Corona Blake. In the 1980s and 1990s things started to take a turn. Women filmmakers in Mexico finally got the opportunity to create and produce professional feature films. The most popular two would be El secreto de Romeila (1988) directed by Busi Cortés and Los pasos de Ana (1990) by Marisa Sistach. These two feature films were considered the doors that opened opportunity for women filmmakers in Mexico as well as created a new genre that people were not familiar with, labeled as 'women's cinema'. The phenomenal growth of 'women's cinema' not only meant that there would be an infinite expansion in the list of female names as filmmakers or creators; in reality, it created a daunting cinematic genre by objectifying women as well as displacing them within the film industry.

Most of the female filmmakers in Mexico recognize as feminists. The primary reason for many of them to commit to being filmmakers was to depict stories of women in their original and true essence as well as to strive in readapting roles of females on the Mexican screen. According to Patricia Torres San Martín, an honorable film scholar, there is a new theme emerging within the film industry in Mexico which is known as the 'new female identity'. This new structural change in cinema created a geographical cultural change in Mexico due to its new emerged eye-opening concept in the film industry. One of Maria Novaro first short films (a school work: An Island Surrounded by Water, 1984) was acquired by the Museum of Modern Art in New York for its permanent film collection and was distributed in the United States by Women Make Movies. Maria's 1994 El Jardín del Edén (The Garden of Eden) obtain her a second nomination for the Ariel Award for Best Picture the first for a woman in Mexico. In the Garden of Eden, three very different women find themselves in the Mexican-American border town of Tijuana, each with her own goal. The women: struggling artist Elizabeth (Rosario Sagrav), Jane (Renée Coleman), who's looking for her brother, and Serena (Gabriela Roel), a widow who just arrived in town with her family in tow. Although the trio come from different cultural backgrounds—Serena is Mexican, Jane is American and Elizabeth is Mexican-American—all three are similarly in search of a new direction.

Mariana Chenillo became the first female director to win an Ariel Award for Best Picture back in 2010 for the film Nora's Will. The Ariel is the Mexican Academy of Film Award. In cinema, it is considered Mexico's equivalent to the Academy Awards ("Oscars") of the United States. The film's plot revolves around a mysterious photograph left under a bed which leads to an unexpected outcome. Issa López wrote the scripts for several film features, three of them produced in Mexico by the Major Hollywood Studios, and two of those directed by herself; Efectos Secundarios (Warner Bros., 2006) and Casi Divas (Sony Pictures, 2008). Casi Divas is the only Mexican movie to be scored by acclaimed Hollywood composer Hans Zimmer.

== Europe ==
=== Belgium ===
In Belgium, French language is the second most used, and many Belgian filmmakers choose to shoot their films in French, thus their films often gain popularity in France.

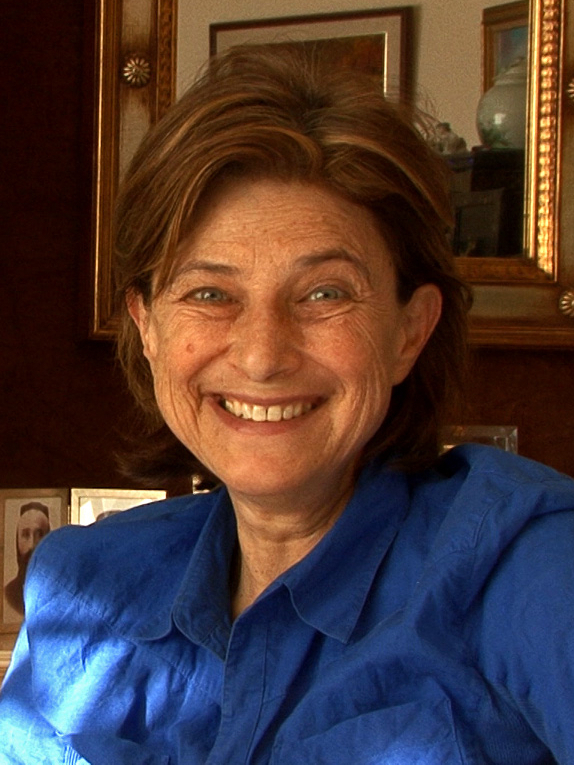
Chantal Akerman is the most acclaimed Belgian film director.

Chantal Akerman is the most famous Belgian director. As director she debuted with the documentary feature Hotel Monterey in 1973. Her next film was dramatic feature Je Tu Il Elle (1974). Her best-known film is Jeanne Dielman, 23 quai du Commerce, 1080 Bruxelles (1975) about a housewife who earns a living as a prostitute. It premiered at the Cannes Film Festival. The film garnered a cult following in the following decades. Chantal Akerman had a long career as a filmmaker from the year 1968 to 2015, until her death, lasting almost 50 years.

Other notable film directors from Belgium include Lydia Chagoll, Marion Hänsel, Anne Lévy-Morelle, Nadine Monfils, Yolande Moreau, Nathalie Teirlinck, Fien Troch, Chris Vermorcken and Laura Wandel.

Marion Hänsel's film Between the Devil and the Deep Blue Sea (1995) was screened at the Cannes Film Festival.

Yolande Moreau initially became famous as an actress. In 2004 she debuted as a film director with When the Sea Rises for which she won a César award.

Laura Wandel made her debut as film director with the film Playground (2021) which was screened at Cannes Film Festival where it won the FIPRESCI prize. It was also submitted as the Belgian entry for the best foreign film at the 94th Academy Awards.

Fien Troch is a well-known modern Belgian director. Her film debut Someone Else's Happiness (2005) was the Belgian entry at the Academy Awards. Her film Unspoken (2008) premiered at the Toronto Film Festival.

=== Bulgaria ===
Binka Zhelyazkova was the first Bulgarian woman to direct a feature film with Life Flows Quietly By... in 1957 and was one of the few women worldwide to direct feature films in the 1950s.

Irina Aktasheva, a Russian, made several Bulgarian films during the 1960s and 1970s, including Monday Morning in 1965. Radka Bachvarova was a Bulgarian director of animation. Lada Boyadjieva had two films compete for the Short Film Palme d'Or in 1961 and 1962. Ivanka Grybcheva made films in the 1970s and 1980s.

=== Czechia ===
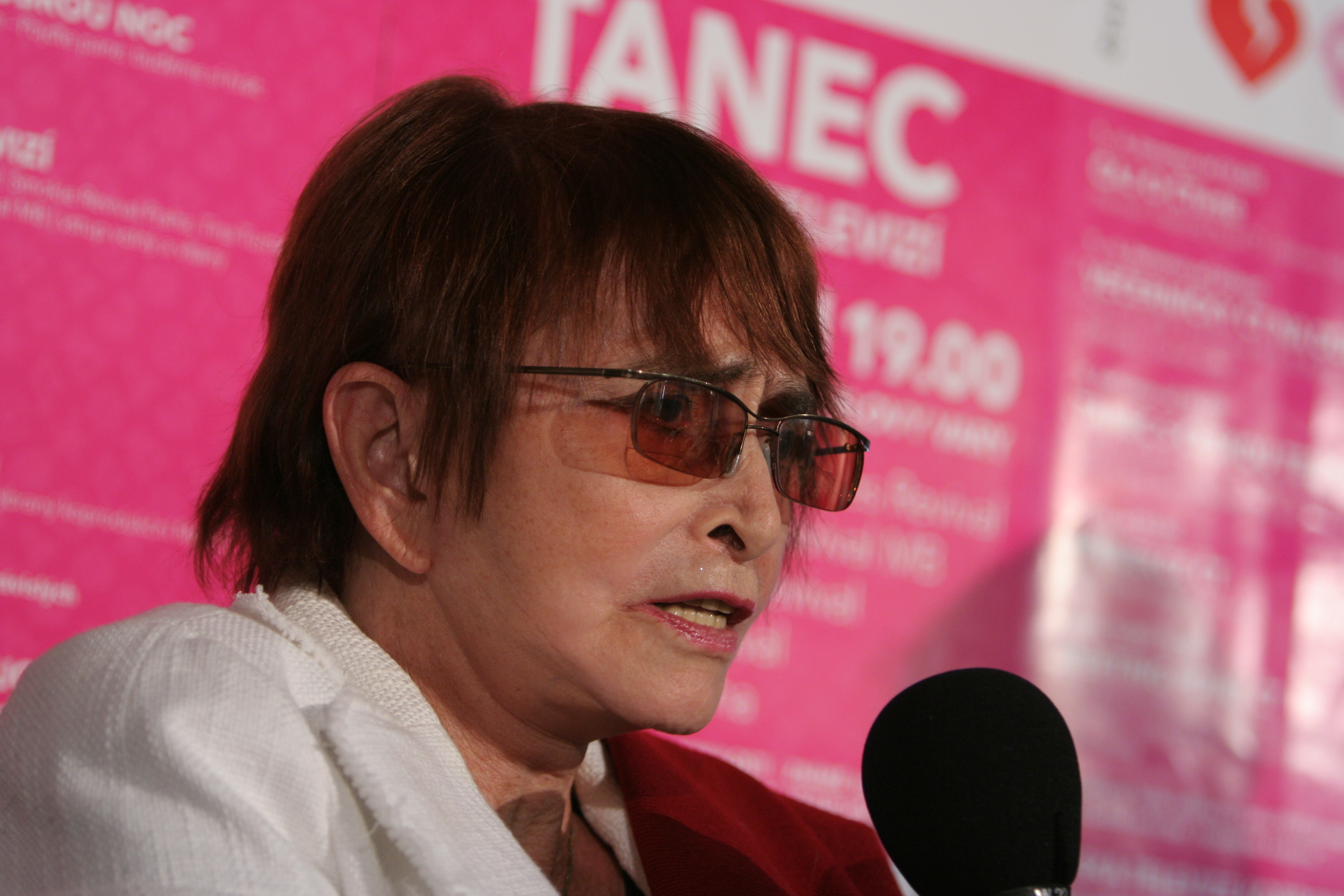
Avant-garde film director Věra Chytilová

Olga Rautenkranzová is the first woman director from Czechoslovakia. In 1918 she directed Kozlonoh and Ucitel orientálních jazyku. Little has been published about her life and career.

Thea Červenková is the second Czechoslovak woman film director. In 1919 she directed Monarchistické spiknutí, Náměsíčný, Byl první máj and Zloděj. She was also screenwriter, writer, documentary maker, film actress, film journalist and critic, producer, film company owner and founding partner.

Věra Chytilová was an avant-garde Czech film director and pioneer of Czech New Wave cinema. Banned by the Czechoslovak government in the 1960s, she is best known for her film Daisies (1966).

Hermína Týrlová was a prominent Czech director of animated films. She was active between 1928 and 1986. Týrlová produced over 60 films.

=== Denmark ===
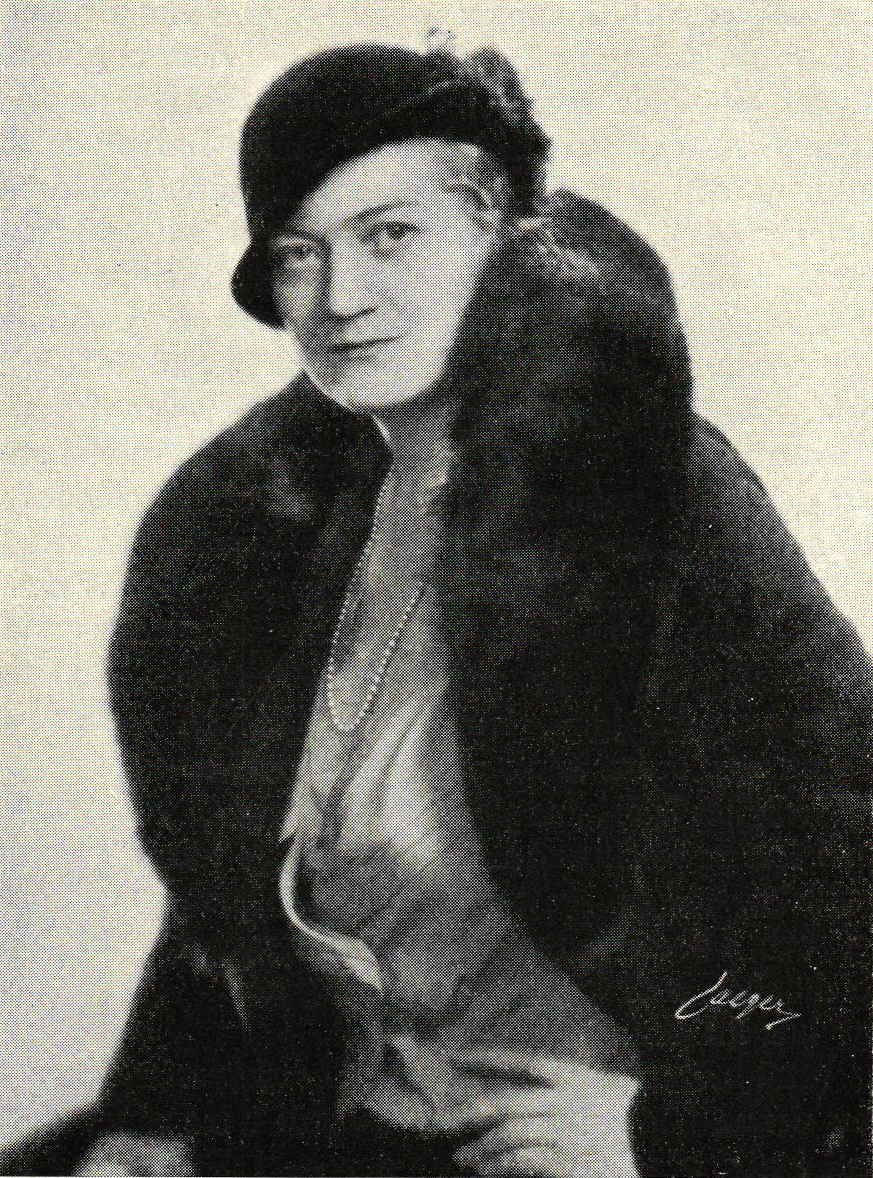
Film director and actress Bodil Ipsen is one of the most acclaimed Danish filmmakers.

The first Danish feature film to be directed by a woman was Ud i den kolde sne from 1934, directed by Alice O'Fredericks, who would go on to be one of the most prolific Danish film directors. She initially co-directed her films with Lau Lauritzen Jr., however in the 1940s she started directing films on her own. She is credited with directing more than 70 feature films as well as writing screenplays for more than 30 films making her one is one of the most productive directors in Danish cinema and among her most memorable films are the Far til Fire-films and the filmatization of the Morten Korch novels, which were all very popular during the Golden Age of Danish Cinema. She is also noted for her films focusing on women and women's rights.

In the 1940s the star actress Bodil Ipsen and the screenwriter Grete Frische joined O'Fredericks in directing mainstream feature films. Ipsen would towards the end of her career co-direct with Lau Lauritsen Jr. and Fische would co-direct Så mødes vi hos Tove with O'Fredericks. She received the Cannes Film Festival Grand Prix for her film The Red Meadows in 1946—the very first year of the festival.

Other prolific Danish directors include Astrid Henning-Jensen, who became the first female director to be nominated for an Academy Award with Paw, Susanne Bier, the first female director to win a Golden Globe, an Academy Award, an Emmy Award and a European Film Award, and Lone Scherfig, whose films have been nominated for Academy Awards, BAFTAs and a European Film Award.

The oldest Danish film award is named Bodil Award after Bodil Ipsen and Bodil Kjer, and the Alice Award, which is award to the best female director at the Copenhagen International Film Festival is named in honor of Alice O'Fredericks.

=== Finland ===
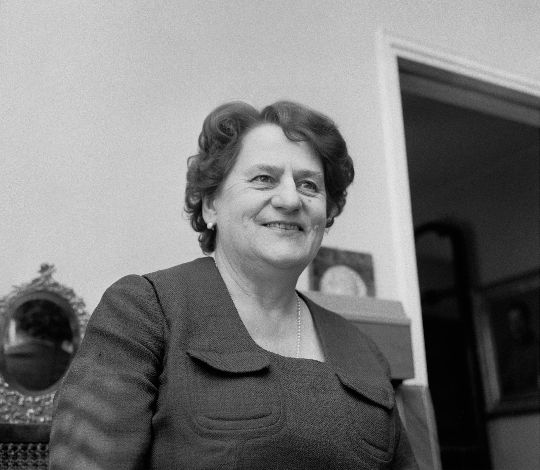
Glory Leppänen was the first woman to direct a film in Finland in 1936.

Glory Leppänen was the first Finnish woman to direct a film. Her 1936 feature film A Stroke of Luck (Onnenpotku) starred Miss Finland Ester Toivonen. As of February 2020, it holds the record for the most cinema-goers of any film directed by a Finnish woman.

Ansa Ikonen, Kyllikki Forssell, and Ritva Arvelo are also among the first Finnish women film directors. Ansa Ikonen, made her directorial debut with the 1944 film Nainen on valttia (Woman is the Wild Card). Kyllikki Forssell directed her first film, Onnellinen Perhe (Happy Family), in 1953, which was an episode of an anthology titled Shamrock consisting of three short films. Ritva Arvelo's directorial debut came in 1961 with Kultainen vasikka (The Golden Calf).

In the 21st century, new talents have emerged in Finnish cinema. The experimental feature film M (2018), directed by Anna Eriksson and centered on actress Marilyn Monroe, was screened at the Venice International Film Festival. Her follow-up, the dystopian film shot in French about the dying Madame Europe and her Chinese man-machine, W, premiered at the 2022 Locarno Film Festival.

Tove (2020), directed by Zaida Bergroth, tells the story of bisexual Moomins creator Tove Jansson. The film received critical acclaim and was Finland's entry for the 2021 Oscars.

The apocalyptic drama Quarantine (2021), directed by Diana Ringo, was Finland and Russia's entry for the 2022 Golden Globes. Her next film, an adaptation of George Orwell's 1984, was released in 2023.

Hanna Bergholm's body horror film Hatching and the coming-of-age film Girl Picture (2022), directed by Alli Haapasalo, both premiered at the 2022 Sundance Film Festival.

Women directors active since 2000 include Johanna Vuoksenmaa, Pamela Tola, Auli Mantila, Taru Mäkelä, Selma Vilhunen and Tiina Lymi. Johanna Vuoksenmaa is known for her films 21 Ways to Ruin a Marriage (2013), Upswing (2020), and Adult Camp (2012), as well as the television series Kumman kaa. Pamela Tola, both a director and actress, has directed works such as Swingers (2018) and Ladies of Steel (2020). Auli Mantila, recognized for her work as a director and screenwriter, is best known for her film Geography of Fear (2001) and various television dramas. Taru Mäkelä has directed films including The Storage (2011) and August Fools (2013).

=== France ===
France, cinema's birthplace, fostered both its technical and artistic development, notably through a strong tradition of female directors, with three pioneers, representing cinema's beginning, middle, and end, leaving a lasting heritage.

Female director, Alice Guy was existent during the birth of cinema. Germaine Dulac was around Avant-Garde cinema during the 1920s. Lastly, Agnés Varda (1954) came along the movement of the New Wave.

Among the best known French women film makers are Agnès Varda, Claire Denis, Alice Guy-Blaché, Germaine Dulac, Jacqueline Audry, Catherine Breillat, Nelly Kaplan and Diane Kurys. Others include Julia Ducournau, Céline Sciamma, Mia Hansen-Løve, Mati Diop, Pascale Ferran, Agnès Jaoui, Noémie Lvovsky, Tonie Marshall, Coline Serreau, Danièle Huillet and Danièle Thompson.

==== Silent era — 1920s ====
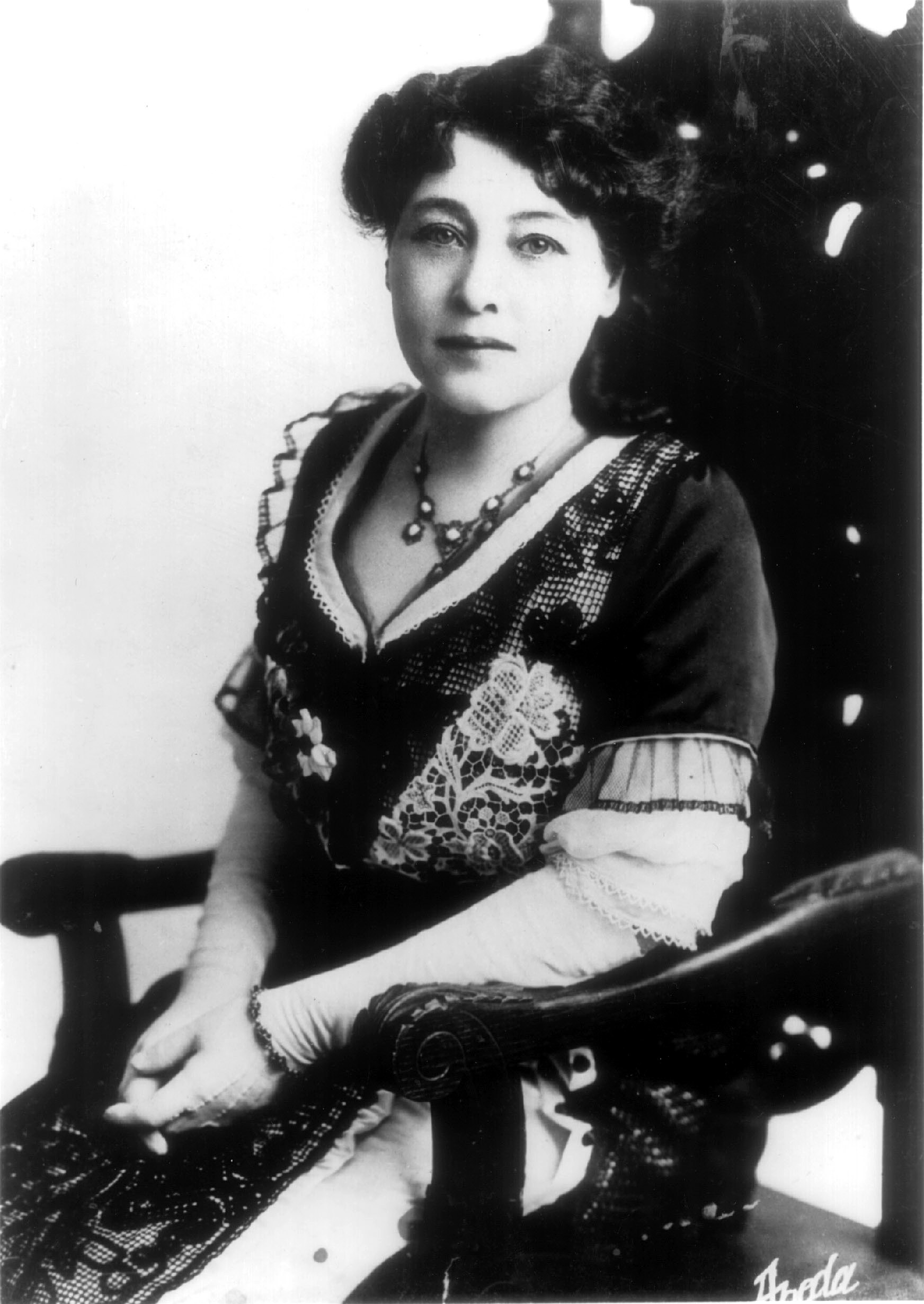
French pioneer film director Alice Guy was the first woman to direct a film.

In the silent era French women directors were highly prominent. Alice Guy-Blaché directed around 700 films and is credited with introducing the narrative form with her film La Fée aux Choux (1896).

Alice Guy was a secretary to Léon Gaumont before the making of her very own first film, which was a year later after the birth of cinema, 1854 to be exact.

Since Alice Guy was working for Gaumont, she was responsible in the production side of the company for being the director, the filmmaker, and set manager. From being a secretary to a head she had created 406 films during this period of time. Most of her films were between 20 and 90 minutes, for a film to be created for this long during this time would be considered to be a short film, but knowing the fact that it was made earlier before is exceptional during the early years. Alice Guy had the chance to shoot some of her films in a different way than Gaumont's forerunner the Lumiere Brothers. The brothers were mostly interested in shooting films which would show what the cameras can capture on a technical level and not what they can express in a deeper extent; for example having repetitive and monotonous shots of trains or the military marching. Guy was not so interested in repetitiveness in films, although she was slightly influenced by them, she had decided to think of something better and comedic. Here she gave in a bunch of short comedic films to Gaumont and he approved of her films. In 1906 she directed the comedic short film The Consequences of Feminism which depicted a world where traditional gender roles are inverted. Within a year of her submission of short films, they have become a complete success. Her film La Passion or so called La Vie du Christ (1906) was a work of art on which she has worked on for years. This has included 25 sets along with a number if exterior areas and around or over 300 crowd scenes.

Germaine Dulac was one of the most creative art film directors and went on to be the leader of the French cinéclub movement. Dulac had studied music first then became a film logician and a journalist. She focused closely on still photography just before the making of her very own first film in the year 1926.

At the time where Germain Dulac was shooting to make her first film in 1916, the film industry in France was in an unusual state because of the early booming that has happened in 1901–1904. During 1910, around sixty to seventy percent of films were sent out worldwide from Paris, however, during 1914 the industry started to decline these films because it lacked investment and production tools for practices. Later on over the years in 1920, the new cinema in France began because of avant-garde filmmaking and the first movement of film theory, in which Dulac was interested in. Dulac started off as a journalist for feminist journals La Fraciase and La Fronde and later became interested in still photography which made her contemplate about the connection between the camera lens and feminism. She was highly influenced by music in her early life, which she incorporated in films to visually see the movement of music. She had made her films sound poetic to show and express emotion and her experience as a feminist journalist affected her work when depicting female characters. One of her best known films is La Souriante Madame Beudet (The Smiling Madame Beudet) created in 1923 which came to be a landmark feminist film. The film's plot revolves around a hard-working female in a loveless marriage.

Musidora was another French film pioneer—she was an actress, film director and screenwriter. She directed films in the 1910s and 1920s.

Marie-Louise Iribe started as an actor in silent films and later owned a production company and directed significant feature films in the 1920s-1930s.

Juliette Bruno-Ruby directed two films in the 1920s.

Marie Epstein was an actress, screenwriter, film director, and film preservationist. She directed films throughout 1920s until 1950s. She often collaborated with her brother, Jean Epstein.

==== 1930s – 1950s ====
Solange Térac directed three films. Her directorial debut was in 1932 with La vagabonde. She is best known for the film Koenigsmark (1953).

Andrée Feix debuted as director with the film Once is Enough (1946). She also directed Captain Blomet (1947).

Nicole Védrès directed two feature documentaries, Paris 1900 (1947) and La Vie Commence Demain (1950). Paris 1900 was screened at the Cannes Film Festival.

Jacqueline Audry directed numerous literary adaptations. Her directorial debut was The Misfortunes of Sophie in 1946. Her films often dealt with controversial topics which included extramarital sex such as Mitsoi (1956) and lesbian romance drama Olivia (1951). Olivia was a groundbreaking film in terms of lesbian representation at the time. She has directed sixteen films altogether and was the first commercially successful woman director of post-war France.

==== 1950s – 1960s and the New Wave ====
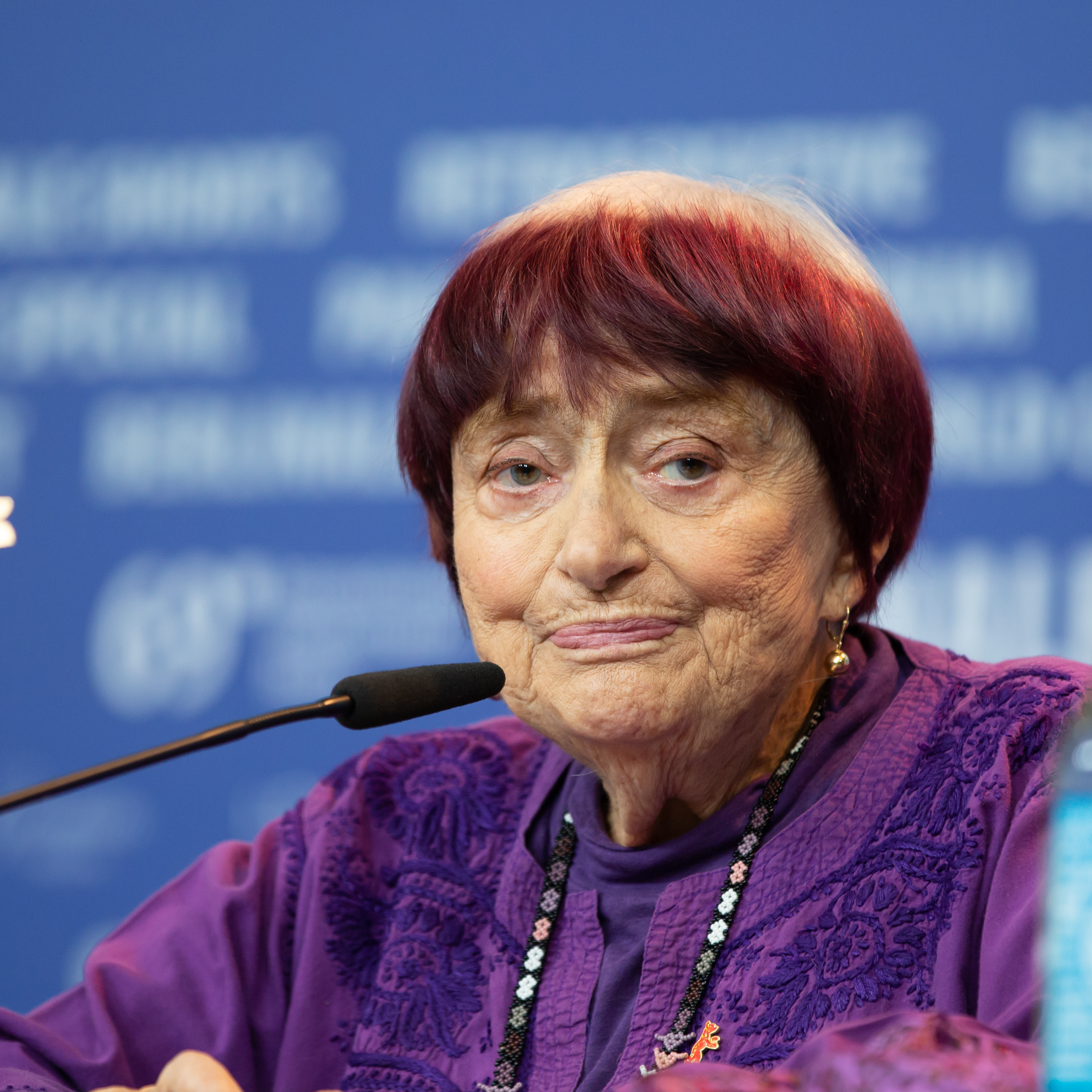
Groundbreaking French New Wave film director Agnes Varda

Initially Agnés Varda had an intense interest in art history at first, and only later she turned towards film and photography in 1954. Her directorial debut was La Pointe Courte (1955) which has been described as the first French New Wave film. Varda is best known for her New Wave masterpiece Cléo from 5 to 7 (1962). It was screened at the 1962 Cannes Film Festival. Another acclaimed film by Varda was Vagabond (1985). Vagabond is considered one of Varda's greater feminist works. She also directed various documentaries during her career. As one of the most active filmmakers of all time, her directing career lasted five decades.

In 1959 writer Marguerite Duras wrote the script for Alain Resnais' Hiroshima Mon Amour. Her script was nominated for the Best Screenplay category at the 1959 Academy Awards. She turned to directing with La Musica in 1966.

Director Danièle Huillet together with her husband made two dozen films between 1963 and 2006. From the Clouds to the Resistance was screened at the 1979 Cannes Film Festival.

Suzanne Schiffman was a screenwriter, script-girl and film director. She is known for her close collaboration with Francois Truffaut. Her directorial output consists of three films. Her directorial debut was in 1971 with Out 1 (co-directed with Jacques Rivette).

Paula Delsol had her directorial debut in 1962 with La Dérive. The film had themes of female sexual liberation.

Film director and writer Marceline Loridan-Ivens directed various documentaries in the 1960s and 1970s. She survived Auschwitz-Birkenau. Her director debut was in 1962 with Algérie, année zéro.

==== 1970s – 1980s ====
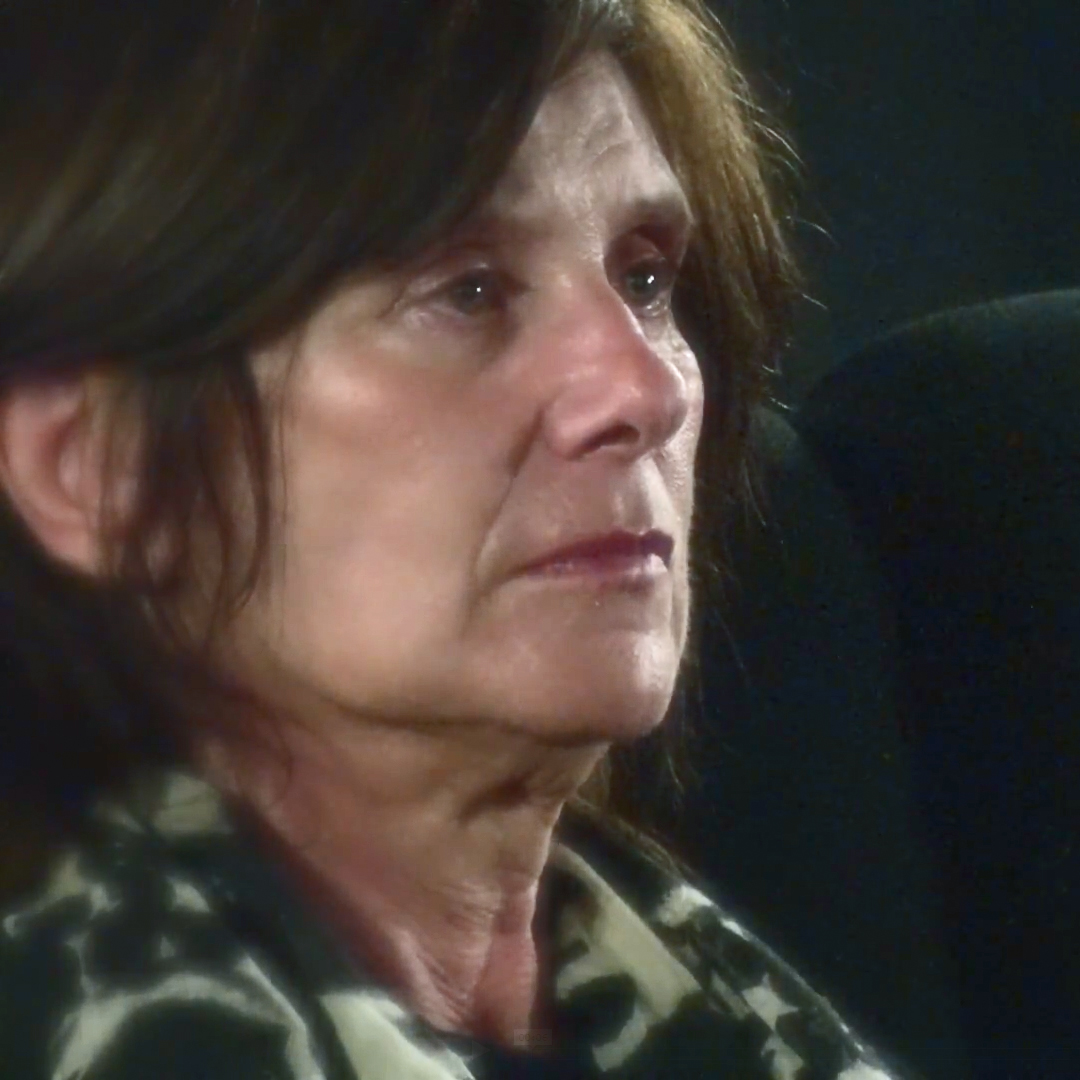
French director Catherine Breillat, who is known for her sexually charged drama films

Noteworthy women filmmakers to emerge from the 1970s include Catherine Breillat, Diane Kurys, Nelly Kaplan, Coline Serreau, Nadine Trintignant, Marion Sarraut, Rachel Weinberg, Véra Belmont, Josée Dayan, Liliane de Kermadec, Sarah Maldoror, Ariane Mnouchkine, Christine Lipinska, Jeanne Labrune, Chantal Akerman, Jeanne Moreau, Euzhan Palcy, Danièle Thompson, Aline Issermann, Anna Karina, Françoise Sagan.

Coline Serrau's directorial debut was in 1974. Her biggest commercial success was Three Men and a Cradle (1985) which was later remade in Hollywood. She received three César Awards for the film.

Diane Kurys' directorial debut coming-of-age film Peppermint Soda was awarded at the 1977 Cannes Film Festival.

Delphine Seyrig was an openly feminist filmmaker active in the 1970s known for her documentary Sois belle et tais-toi released in 1981.

Feminist filmmaker Catherine Breillat is well known for her frank depictions of sexuality and taboo topics in film and for her coming of age works. She faced censorship and controversy during most of her career. Her debut film A Real Young Girl was banned for several decades due to graphic sexuality. Her best known films are A Real Young Girl (1976), Romance (1999) and Fat Girl (2001). In 2007 her film The Last Mistress was selected at the Cannes Film Festival.

Jeanne Moreau, best known as an actress, directed two feature films in the 1970s—Lumière in 1976 about female friendship and The Adolescent in 1978 about a young girl's coming-of-age. Another iconic actress, Anna Karina had her directorial debut in 1973 with Vivre ensemble which was screened at the Cannes Film Festival. In 2008 she directed and starred in the film Victoria.

==== 1980s – 2000s ====
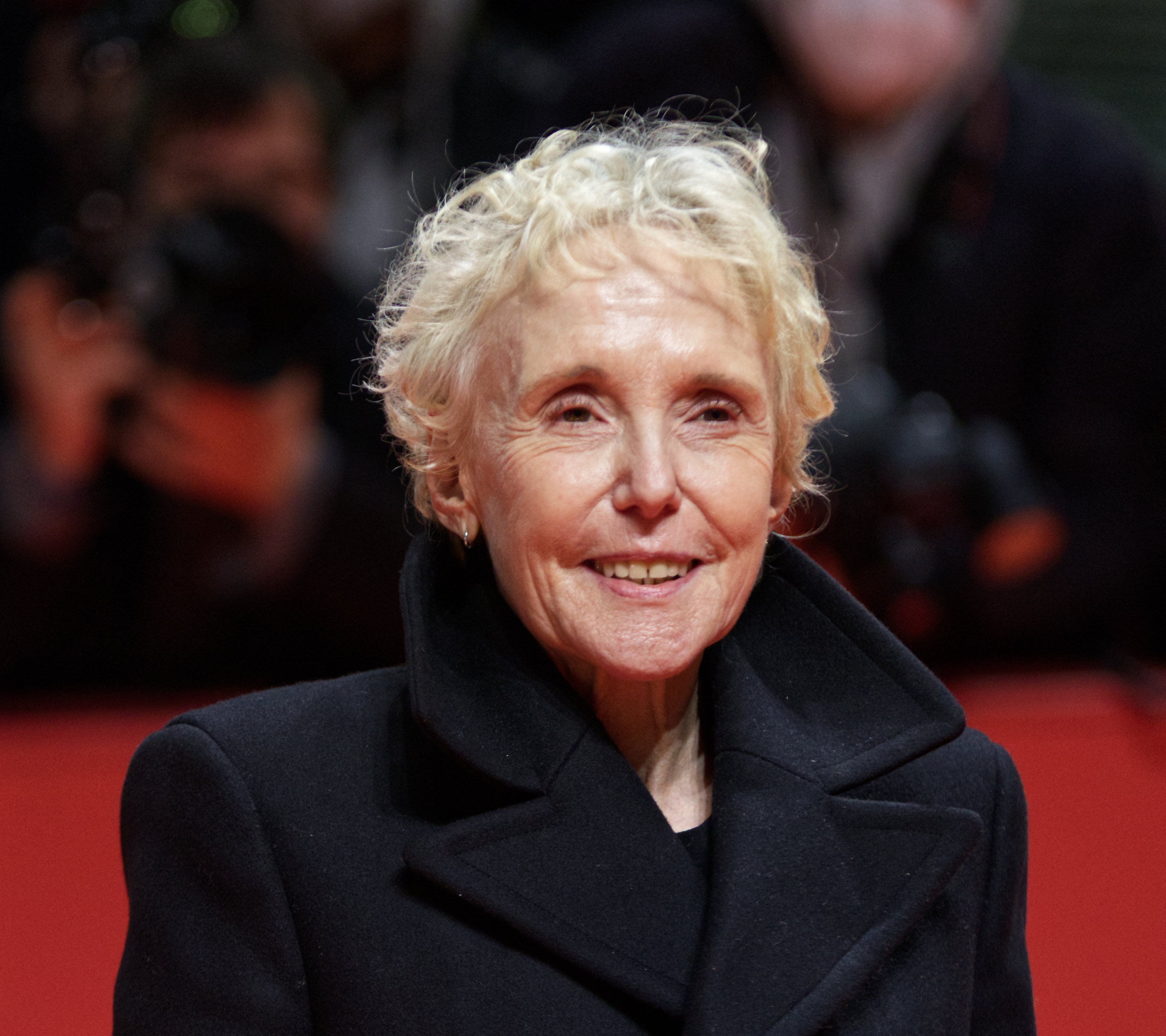
Claire Denis, one of the most acclaimed French filmmakers of the 20th century.

Notable directors to debut in the 1980s – Claire Denis, Catherine Corsini, Tonie Marshall, Claire Devers, Patricia Mazuy, Agnès Merlet, Anne Fontaine, Sólveig Anspach, Juliet Berto, Josiane Balasko, Laurence Ferreira Barbosa.

Claire Denis is one of the most acclaimed French directors to emerge from the late 1980s. Her film debut Chocolat premiered at the 1988 Cannes Film Festival. Her film Beau Travail received rave reviews at the time of its release. In 2022 she won the Grand Prix at Cannes for Stars at Noon. Her career has lasted over three decades.

Director Yolande Zauberman had her debut in 1988 with Classified People. She won an award for Me Ivan, You Abraham at the 1993 Cannes Film Festival.

Filmmaker Catherine Corsini began directing films in the 1980s. Her films Replay (2001) and Three Worlds (2012) screened at the Cannes Film Festival.

Director and screenwriter Pascale Ferran had her feature directorial debut with Coming to Terms with the Dead in 1994 which won the Caméra d'Or at the Cannes Film Festival. Her film Bird People (2014) was screened at the Cannes Film Festival.

In 2000 Tonie Marshall was the first woman to receive the César award as Best Director. Her directorial debut film was Pentimento (1989).

Lisa Azuelos is a well known French director who directed her first film in 1993. Her film LOL (Laughing Out Loud) (2008) was remade in Hollywood in 2012.

Marion Vernoux directed her first film in 1994. She is best known for her 1999 film Empty Days.

Sylvie Verheyde had her directorial debut in 1997. Her 2012 film Confession of a Child of the Century was screened at the Cannes Film Festival.

==== 2000s – present ====
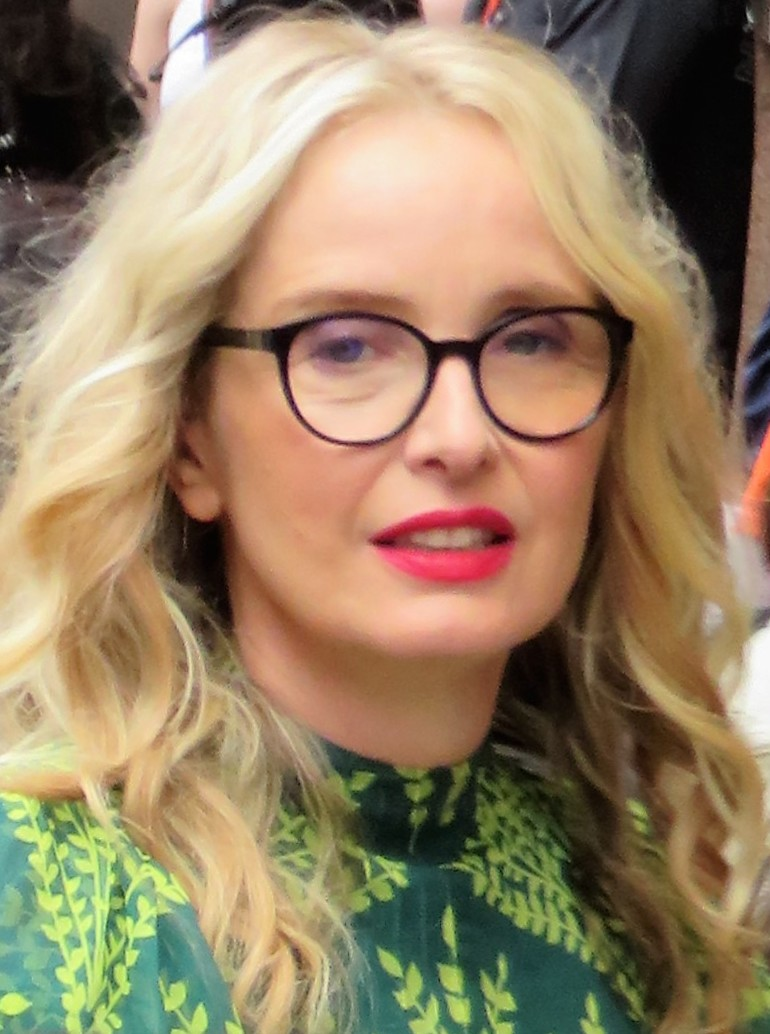
French-American actress and filmmaker Julie Delpy

Modern French directors to become well known in the 2000s and later include Cannes Film Festival winners Julia Ducournau, Céline Sciamma, Mia Hansen-Løve and Mati Diop, Marie Amachoukeli, Rebecca Zlotowski, Claire Burger, Julie Lopes-Curval, Houda Benyamina, Justine Triet.

Other notable directors include Virginie Despentes, Valérie Donzelli, Alix Delaporte, Marie-Castille Mention-Schaar, Marion Laine, Léa Mysius, Sophie Barthes, Marina de Van, Houda Benyamina, Karin Albou, Mona Achache, Lola Bessis.

Many famous actors decide to later on undertake directing duties. Fanny Ardant, Sophie Marceau, Julie Delpy, Zabou Breitman, Maïwenn and Isild Le Besco, Valeria Bruni Tedeschi, Zabou Breitman, Marilou Berry, Sylvie Testud, Brigitte Sy, Emmanuelle Bercot — are all well-known actresses who started to also direct films in the 2000s.

=== German language countries ===
==== Austria ====
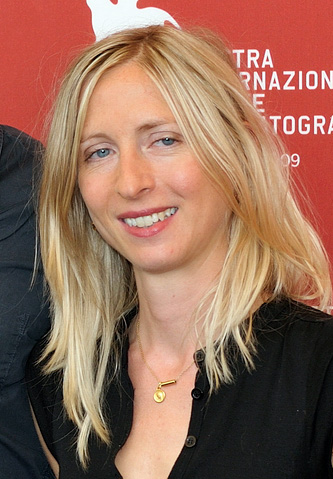
Austrian film director Jessica Hausner

Luise Fleck was an Austrian film director, and considered the second ever female feature film director in the world, after Alice Guy-Blaché. Luise Fleck worked with her husband Jacob and they both shared director credits. In 1911 Luise Fleck directed Die Glückspuppe.

Austrian filmmaker Leontine Sagan is a notable director who worked in Germany.

Contemporary Austrian women directors include Barbara Albert, Jessica Hausner, Marie Kreutzer and Katharina Mückstein. Films by Hausner have been screened at the Cannes Film Festival and at Berlinale.

Katharina Mückstein is a notable feminist and metoo activist, who has been vocally critical of sexual harassment in the Austrian film industry.

Feminist artist and experimental filmmaker Valie Export is notable for her video art works made in the 1970s. Her work was groundbreaking at the time and aroused controversy in the conservative Austrian art world.

==== Germany ====
Lotte Reiniger was a German film director and the foremost pioneer of silhouette animation. Her best known films are The Adventures of Prince Achmed, (1926), the first feature-length animated film, and Papageno (1935).

1931 film Girls in Uniform by Leontine Sagan is one of the earliest narrative films to explicitly portray homosexuality. The film is about a 14-year-old girl who falls in love with her female teacher at an all-girls boarding school.

Actress and director Leni Riefenstahl is best known for making the infamous 1935 Nazi propaganda film Triumph of the Will which despite its controversial nature is still considered as one of the greatest films of all time due to its technical and visual innovations.

German woman filmmakers Helke Sander and Cristina Perincioli are also pioneers of the feminist movement. A feminist newspaper Frauen und Film was founded in 1974 by Helke Sander.

Other prominent female film-makers include Margarethe von Trotta and Helma Sanders-Brahms who both began their careers in the 1970s. Monika Treut has also won recognition for her depictions of queer and alternative sexuality. Contemporary German women directors of note include Maren Ade, Doris Dörrie, Frauke Finsterwalder, Katja von Garnier, Nicolette Krebitz, Caroline Link and Angela Schanelec.

==== Switzerland ====
Anna Indermaur is the first woman film director from Switzerland. Indermaur opened the Nord-Süd cinema studio in 1935.

Ursula Meier is a notable modern Swiss film director. Her films have been screened at the Cannes Film Festival.

=== Hungary ===
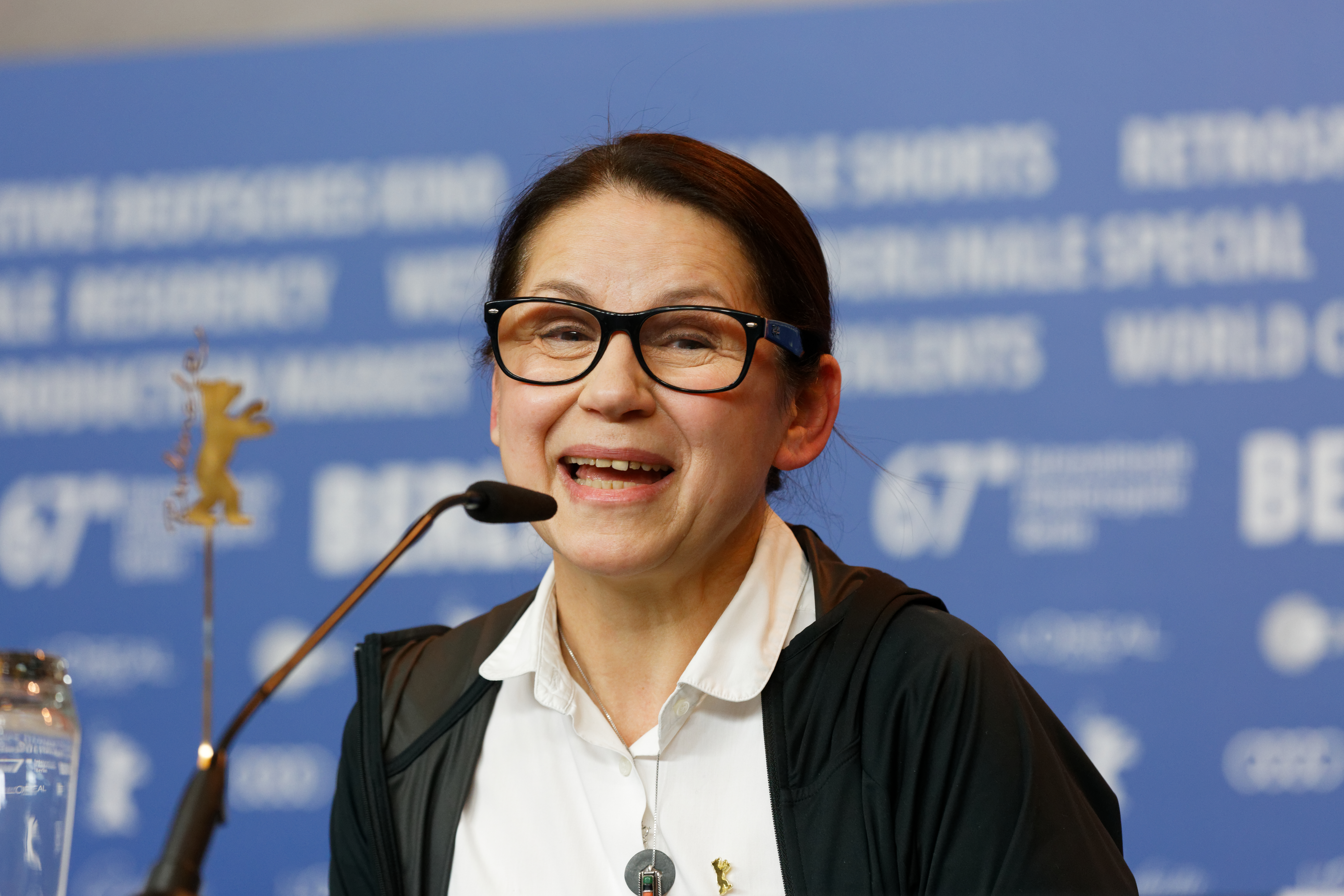
Hungarian film director Ildikó Enyedi

In Hungary film director and screenwriter Marta Meszaros has been making important films for decades, starting from 1968 until 2020. Her full-length directorial debut, Eltavozott nap/The Girl (1968), was the first Hungarian film to have been directed by a woman. Meszaros is best known for her 1984 Cannes Film Festival winning picture Diary for My Children.

Director Ildikó Enyedi is known for her 2017 film On Body and Soul which won the top prize at the 67th Berlin International Film Festival and went on to be nominated for a Foreign Language Academy Award. She has directed eight feature films since 1989.

=== Italy ===
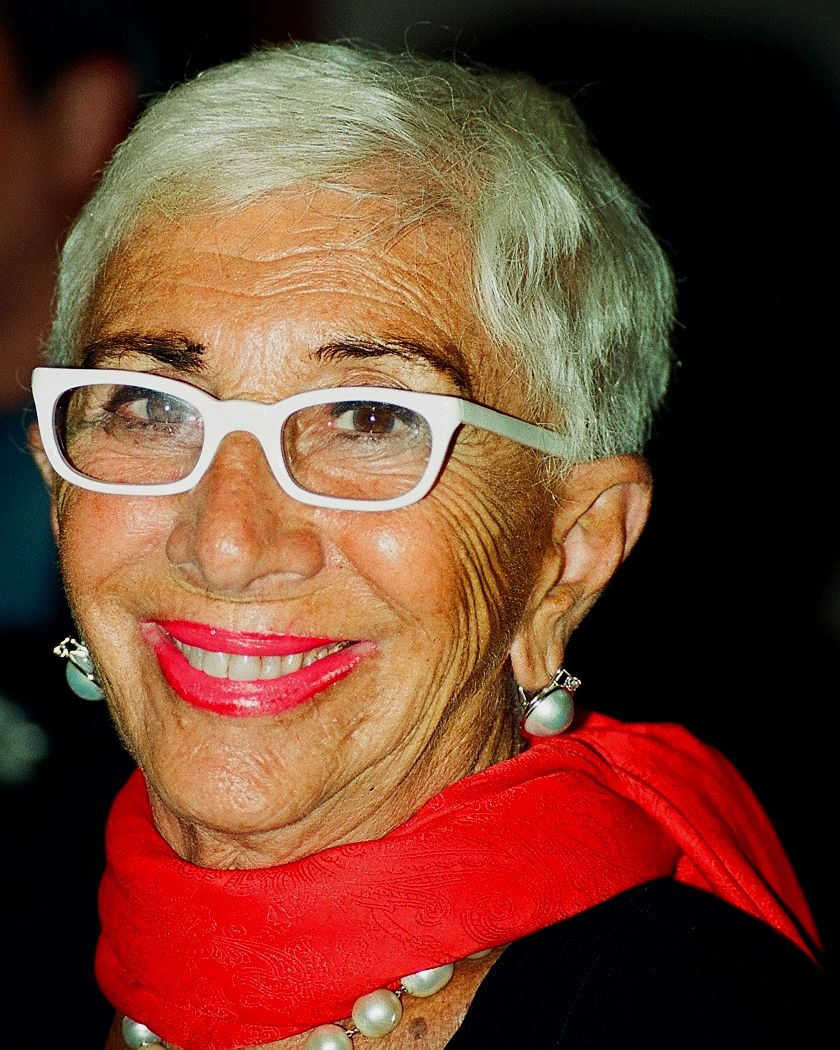
Italian film director Lina Wertmüller became the first woman nominated for the Academy Award for Best Director in 1977.

Elvira Notari was a pioneer of Italian cinema, and she was followed by other prominent female directors as Lina Wertmüller and Liliana Cavani. Countess Marina Cicogna is the first female European producer.

Elvira Notari is the first Italian woman director to make a film. She has directed more than sixty feature films and about 100 documentaries. Notari's first films are Maria Rosa di Santa Flavia, Carmela la pazza, Bufera d'anime, all made in 1911.

Director Diana Karenne was a Polish film pioneer, who directed many of her films in Italy. Her film debut was Lea in 1916 which she directed in Italy. In 1917 she opened her film production company in Milan.

Lina Wertmüller is best known for her satiric films Swept Away (1974) and Seven Beauties (1975). With Seven Beauties Wertmüller became the first female director to be nominated for the Academy Award as Best Director.

Liliana Cavani is best known for her controversial film The Night Porter (1974). Set in Vienna in the 1957, the film centers on the sadomasochistic relationship between a former Nazi concentration camp officer and one of his inmates. The film starred Dirk Bogarde and Charlotte Rampling. In 2002 Cavani directed Ripley's Game starring John Malkovich, based on the novel of the same name by Patricia Highsmith.

Alice Rohrwacher is a notable modern film director from Italy whose films were award winners at the Cannes Film Festival. Her best known films are The Wonders (2014) and Happy as Lazzaro (2018).

=== Norway ===
Norwegian actress Aud Egede-Nissen opened her own production company in 1917 and produced at least 29 films.

Edith Carlmar is Norway's first woman director. Her directorial debut was Death Is a Caress in 1949. Her last film featured the debut of actress Liv Ullmann. Liv Ullmann herself turned to directing in the 1990s.

Notable directors who emerged in the 1960s-1970s period include Anja Breien, Vibeke Lokkeberg, Laila Mikkelsen and Unni Straume.

Eva Dahr had her directorial debut with the film Burning Flowers in 1985. She was also a prolific director of short films.

Norwegian director Deeyah Khan who debuted in 2012 is a two-time Emmy Award winner, two time Peabody Award winner, a BAFTA winner and has received the Royal Television Society award for Best Factual Director.

Director Anne Sewitsky's 2010 film Happy, Happy was Norway's submission to the Academy Awards.

Maria Sødahl is best known for her 2019 film Hope.

Director Mona Fastvold's directorial debut The Sleepwalker (2014) was screened at the Sundance Film Festival. She is based in the US.

=== Poland ===
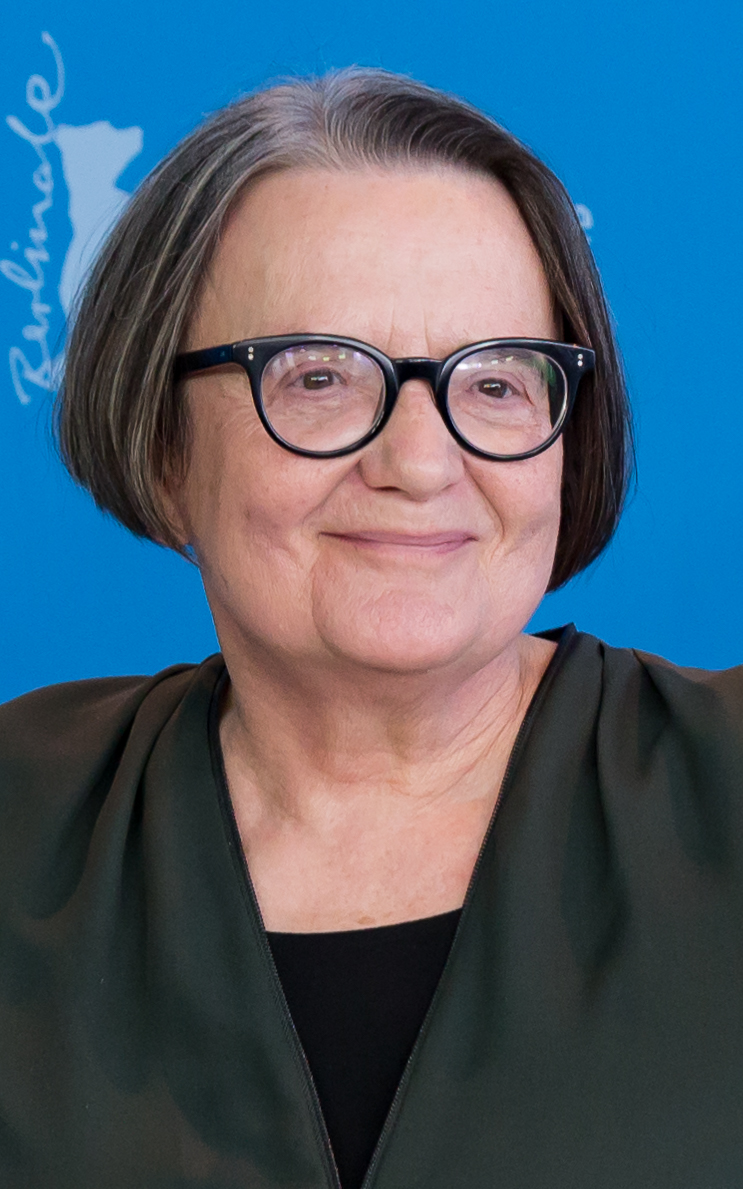
Prolific Polish film director Agnieszka Holland

Nina Niovilla was the first Polish female film director and the only female director of the silent film era in Poland. She debuted in 1918 with the film Die Heiratsannonce.

Director Diana Karenne was another Polish film pioneer, who directed most of her films abroad, in Italy, Germany and France. Her film debut was Lea in 1916 which she directed in Italy.

Wanda Jakubowska was a Polish film director best known for her work on the Holocaust. Her 1948 film The Last Stage was an early and influential depiction of concentration camps. It was filmed on location at Auschwitz, where Jakubowska had been interned. Jakubowska was active as a director for more than 50 years, starting from 1932 until 1988.

Agnieszka Holland is a notable modern film director who has been active in cinema since 1973. Her films have been screened at the Cannes Film Festival and the Berlin International Film Festival. Her sister Magdalena Łazarkiewicz and daughter Kasia Adamik are both film directors.

Other Polish film directors include Maria Kaniewska, Agnieszka Smoczyńska, Urszula Antoniak, Małgorzata Szumowska, Ewa Petelska, Teresa Kotlarczyk, Anna Kazejak-Dawid, Dorota Kobiela.

=== Portugal ===
Bárbara Virgínia became the first woman film director of Portugal in 1945 with the film Três Dias Sem Deus. It was screened at the Cannes Film Festival.

Portuguese editor and director Manuela Viegas' 1999 film Gloria, premiered in competition at the 57th Berlinale, is considered in her country the climax of a cinema of feminine sensibility. Other Portuguese female film directors include Teresa Villaverde, Catarina Ruivo, Raquel Freire, Margarida Gil, Cláudia Tomaz and Rita Azevedo Gomes. The current president of the Portuguese Directors Association is Margarida Gil.

=== Russia ===
==== Russian Empire and Soviet Union Era ====
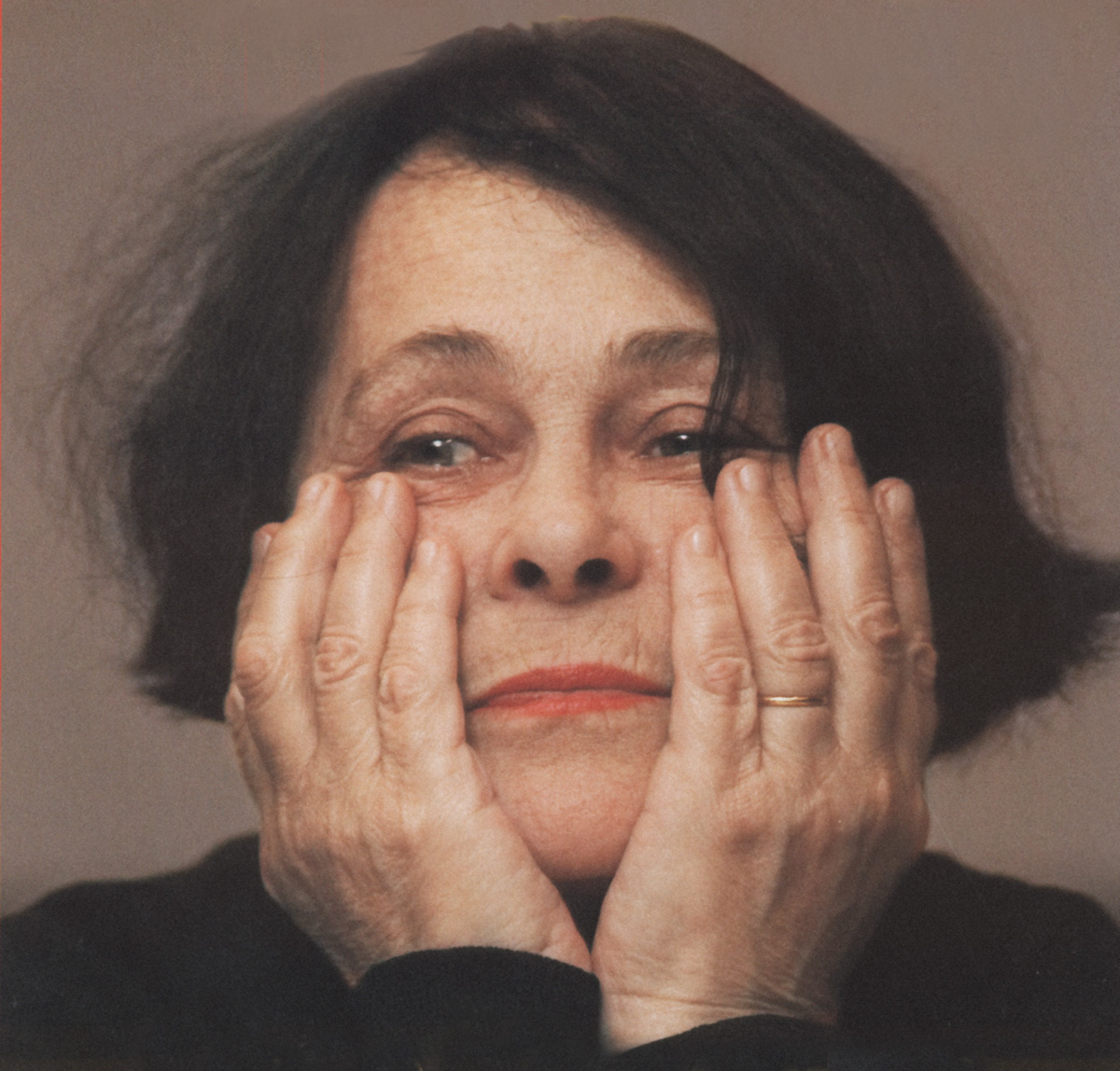
Kira Muratova is one of the most acclaimed Soviet film directors.

Russian cinematography has seen a number of women directors who created nationally and internationally acclaimed movies. The first Russian moving picture produced by a female director came out in the 1910s. Olga Preobrazhenskaya was introduced into the fledgling film industry by Yakov Protazanov. In 1913 Olga Preobrazhenskaya began directing films in the "Timan and Reingardt" studio. Her first work as a director was a joint effort with actor, screenwriter and director Vladimir Gardin—in 1916, they filmed Miss Peasant based on the work of the same name by Pushkin. As Olga Preobrazhenskaya put it, "the film came out, it was praised, but since it was the first production of a woman director, it was treated with distrust, and on the posters and reviews my name was often written with a male ending or attributed to the production of other directors." In the first years after the Revolution, Olga Preobrazhenskaya was also the first woman to teach directing: she taught classes at the State School of Cinematography (now VGIK). Preobrazhenskaya's most successful work is the drama Women of Ryazan (1927), which the writer Theodore Dreiser, who visited the USSR at the time, called a miracle. The film was about the difficult life of an ordinary Russian peasant woman in the countryside on the eve and after the revolution. Preobrazhenskaya created this picture together with the director Ivan Pravov, as many of her other films, designed in the spirit of socialist realism: And Quiet Flows the Don, Stepan Razin, The Lad from the Taiga.

Brumberg sisters were pioneer animators. They were active between 1925 and 1970. In a career lasting almost 50 years, they created around 50 films as animation directors, animators and screenwriters.

Nadezhda Kosheverova was considered the greatest fairy tale director of the Soviet cinema. In spite of the fact that the director tried herself in different genres, from realistic (Galya) to comedies (Tamer of Tigers), it was in the fairy tale genre that her talent revealed itself most fully. The most famous of her ten works in this genre is Cinderella released in 1947, filmed together with Mikhail Shapiro on the script of Evgeny Schwartz. Cinderella was, perhaps, the first fairy tale in the history of the Soviet cinema, devoid of any ideological overtones, but at the same time reflecting with mild satire the features of the Soviet way of life. For example, in the stepmother, played by Faina Ranevskaya, one may easily recognize the exemplary communal activist. And also for the first time in the Soviet cinema aristocratic heroes—King Erast Garin and Prince Alexei Konsovsky—are not portrayed as caricatured negative characters.

Margarita Barskaya was the first director who succeeded in showing the world through the eyes of a child. In 1933, she released Tattered Shoes, the first sound film for children in the history of the world cinema. It told the story of children growing up in a conventional European country where the fascist regime came to power. After the film's release, Barskaya was immediately talked about as a new, original talent, and much later, almost as a forerunner of Italian neo-realism. Viewers were delighted by how casually children behaved in the frame, as if not noticing the lens—the credit goes to Barskaya who developed her own system of working with young actors. Margarita Barskaya was the initiator of the world's first children's film studio "Soyuzdetfilm", where a full-length film Father and Son was shot. It never appeared on the screens: the critics branded the picture as "fake", because Barskaya, true to her style, reflected the life of a Soviet family without embellishment. The director was no longer allowed to shoot—mainly because of her friendship with the disgraced oppositionist Karl Radek, as a result, the film Father and Son was the last work of Barskaya.

Filmmaker Yulia Solntseva, before becoming a famous director, managed to attract attention as an actress thanks to her main roles in silent films Aelita and The Cigarette Girl from Mosselprom. The most famous work of Solntseva was Poem of the Sea, filmed in 1958 from a script by her husband, director Alexander Dovzhenko, in which the director presented the construction of the Kakhovka hydroelectric station in the style of an ancient Greek epic. Another notable work by Solntseva was the first wide-screen film in Europe, Chronicle of Flaming Years (1960), which won the award for best director at Cannes.

Iskra Babich, a 1958 graduate of VGIK, was a favorite student of director and teacher Ivan Pyryev. She had only four full-length films in her filmography – all four melodramas. Babich made penetrating films about love, conscience and kindness—but without excessive expression and eccentric plots. The director's most famous film is Muzhiki! (1982), which won many awards and achieved international recognition.

Dinara Asanova, a student of Mikhail Romm, is known as a director who accurately shows the conflicting nature of an adolescent. Two of her most famous films—a lyrical story about unrequited love Woodpeckers Don't Get Headaches (1975) and a drama about young hooligans Boys (1983), which featured amateur actors, real troubled teens. After the movie Asanova began to receive packs of letters: people were asking for advice, believing that the director was a qualified specialist in the education of "difficult children". However, Asanova's only task was to show that the transition period between adolescence and youth is not a rehearsal for "real", adult life, but an important part of our only, big, life.

Larisa Shepitko was one of the central figures of the Soviet cinema in the 1960s and '70s. One of her most acclaimed films, Wings, released in 1966, reflected on the fate of front-line soldiers. The war veteran in the film was a woman, a former aviator Nadezhda Petrukhina, who after the war became the director of a vocational school. The main character, forced to abandon the sky, had to live by the new rules, which did not have the moral clarity inherent in wartime, which eventually brought her to an existential dead end, like many in her generation. In order to shoot her main film, The Ascension (1976), Shepitko had to confront the authorities. The film became the first Soviet picture to win the "Golden Bear" at the Berlin International Film Festival.

Tatiana Lukashevich debuted as a film director at the age of 24: her film Ivan Karavaev's Crime was more like an artistically designed film propaganda than an artistic statement, but it still drew attention to the young director. Later Lukashevich made mostly films that contributed to the "moral education of the younger generation" ("Gavrosh", "The Foundling", "The Maturity Certificate"). Despite the director's strict adherence to the canons of socialist realism, such values as humanity and genuineness were always in the foreground in Lukashevich's films. This is most noticeable in the film The Foundling, whose main idea is expressed in the lines of a lullaby: "In our big city, everyone is kind to the baby."

For Aida Manasarova, perhaps the most important thing in her work was the careful avoidance of everything too idealistic and far-fetched. According to Manasarova, it was "much more important for her to show the real drama of the search for moral ideals," so her characters were never one-dimensional and positive. Almost all of her films told about people experiencing a deep inner crisis. "I like heroes who are tormented by their imperfection," Manasarova admitted. One of the highlights of the directors works is a family drama "Look away" (1983) about the difficult relationship between mother and son.

Seventeen Moments of Spring, one of the most famous and nationally acclaimed series known in the Soviet cinema, was also made by a female director Tatyana Lioznova. However, the director is known not only for the story of the popular Soviet spy. A key character in all her works was a man who finds himself in unnatural conditions, a white crow, who is tested for his resilience, and not always successfully. Nyura from the film Three Poplars in Plyushchikha in 1967 who never found love; Nina from Carnival (1981) who returned to her small town, not having achieved any success as a great actress; Lenya from the film We, below (1980) who failed at collecting the signatures he so badly needed. This combination of stubbornness and humility is characteristic of her films. As the playwright Alexander Gelman put it, "her films are sincere, the truth of the soul in them surpasses the truth of facts, as it happens in life with real people."

Alla Surikova is notable for directing many successful comedy films. Her most popular film is the satiric Red-Western A Man from the Boulevard des Capucines (1987).

Kira Muratova always strove to make films which she herself wanted to create, irrespective of changes of political agenda, regimes and aesthetic guidelines. This led to her first films—Brief Encounters (1967) and The Long Farewell (1971) getting shelved; the third, Getting to Know the Big, Wide World (1979), was never shown in wide distribution, and the fourth, Among Grey Stones (1983), heavily cut down by censorship, and released under the pseudonym of Ivan Sidorov. Finally, The Asthenic Syndrome (1989), released as Muratova wanted, brought her worldwide acclaim. Today Muratova is one of the most acclaimed Soviet directors.

==== Post-Soviet Era ====
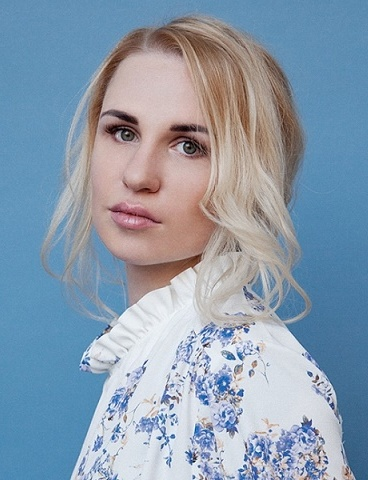
Valeriya Gai Germanika is one of the most well-known post-Soviet film directors.

There are many new and important names in the strong Russian female tradition of filmmaking in the 21-century, and the number is constantly increasing.

Svetlana Baskova gained nationwide notoriety for directing the exploitation shock-horror film The Green Elephant in 1999. She later directed the films Five Bottles of Vodka (2001) and For Marx (2012), which also starred Vladimir Epifantsev.

Renata Litvinova, initially famous as an actress in Kira Muratova's films, honed her directorial skills in Goddess: How I fell in Love (2004) and The Last Tale of Rita. Her latest notable work is the 2021 feature The North Wind. Litvinova usually also stars in her films.

One of the most popular modern Russian directors Anna Melikyan, is known as author of Sundance winner Mermaid (2007), blockbuster romantic comedy About Love and satiric romantic drama The Three (2020).

Director Avdotya Smirnova, initially known as a screenwriter, is the author of the films Two Days (2011), Story of One Appointment (2018) and biopic series Vertinskiy (2021) about the famous Russian singer.

Oksana Bychkova, is best known as director of the romantic comedy-dramas Piter FM (2006) and Plus One (2008).

Valeriya Gai Germanika, one of the most provocative names in the Russian film industry, initially only directed documentary films. She is well known for her Cannes Film Festival winning feature Everybody Dies but Me (2008). Her latest work, series Mutual Consent (2022) about a raped schoolteacher has been described by the authors as the first MeToo series from Russia.

Diana Ringo, is director of the dystopia film Quarantine (2021) starring Anatoly Bely. Quarantine is a philosophical and experimental art-house film about a man who lives in a bunker for 20 years. Diana Ringo is the director, producer, screenwriter, and composer of the film's score. Besides directing, Diana Ringo is also a professional musician and composer.

2021 film Gerda about a young striptease dancer by director Natalya Kudryashova premiered at the Locarno Film Festival where it received several awards. Kudryashova is also active as an actress.

Natalya Merkulova is well-known for her films co-directed with her husband, Aleksey Chupov. Her films The Man Who Surprised Everyone (2018) and Captain Volkonogov Escaped (2021) have been screened at the Venice International Film Festival.

Radda Novikova is a film and television director. She is one of the most prolific Russian television comedy directors of the 21st century. She has directed many popular TV series including Girls with Makarov (2022), Interns (2013), Two Fathers, Two Sons (2011). In 2025 she directed the feature film The Crazy Empress.

=== Spain ===
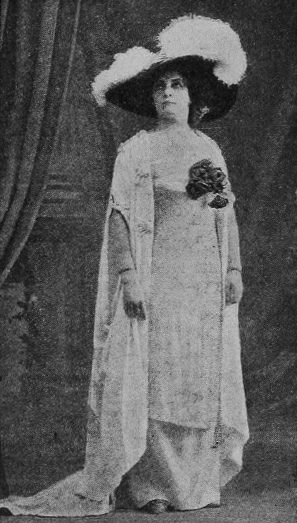
Elena Jordi was the first female director in Spain.

Elena Jordi was the first woman director of Spain. She directed Thaïs in 1918.

Pioneer filmmakers Josefina Molina, Helena Cortesina, Rosario Pi were among the first women film directors of Spain.

María Forteza was the first woman director of a sound picture in 1934 with the short film documentary Mallorca.

Ana Mariscal was a prolific actress in the 1940s and 1950s. In the early 1950s she became a producer and shortly after started directing and writing her own films. Her best-known film is perhaps El camino (1963), an adaptation of the novel by Miguel Delibes. Other films include Segundo López, aventurero urbano (1953) inspired by Italian neorealism or Con la vida hicieron fuego (1959), about a former combatant of the Republican faction who tries to start a new life while battling the haunting memories of the Spanish Civil War.

Josefina Molina, also a novelist, started her career in the 1960s. She was the first woman who graduated from Spain's National Film School in 1967. Her prolific TV résumé includes the highly successful miniseries Teresa de Jesús (1984), a dramatization of Teresa of Avila's life. Her work on film includes Vera, un cuento cruel (1974), Función de noche (1981) or Esquilache (1989) which was entered into the 39th Berlin International Film Festival.

Pilar Miró was a celebrated director and screenwriter of film and TV whose notable works include Gary Cooper, Who Art in Heaven (1980), Prince of Shadows (1991) which won the Silver Bear for outstanding artistic contribution at the 42nd Berlin International Film Festival and El perro del hortelano (1996), an adaptation of a Lope de Vega play which won 7 Goya Awards including Best Picture and Best Director. She was also in charge of Spain's national broadcast television TVE from 1986 to 1989.

Icíar Bollaín made her acting debut as a teenager under Víctor Erice's direction in El sur (1983). She made the jump to directing and writing in 1995 with Hola, ¿estás sola? which earned her a nomination for a Goya Award for Best New Director. Her subsequent filmography includes Flores de otro mundo (1999) winner of the Grand Prix award at the International Critics' Week at the 1999 Cannes Film Festival, Te doy mis ojos (2003) which won her a Goya Award for Best Director and a nomination for a European Film Award for Best Director or Even the Rain (2010) which made the January shortlist for the Academy Award for Best Foreign Language Film.

Isabel Coixet directed numerous television commercials during the 1990s. She usually films in English with international actors. Some of her best known films include My Life Without Me (2003), starring Sarah Polley, Mark Ruffalo, Scott Speedman and Deborah Harry, The Secret Life of Words (2005) once again starring Polley as well as Tim Robbins and Julie Christie, a segment on the omnibus film Paris, je t'aime (2006) and the Philip Roth adaptation Elegy (2008) starring Ben Kingsley, Penélope Cruz, Dennis Hopper and Patricia Clarkson.

Gracia Querejeta has won acclaim for her ensemble dramas By My Side Again (1999), Héctor (2004) and Seven Billiard Tables (2007). She has also directed documentaries and TV episodes.

Other notable filmmakers include María Ripoll (Tortilla Soup, The Man with Rain in His Shoes), Patricia Ferreira, Chus Gutiérrez, María Lidón aka Luna (Stranded: Náufragos, Moscow Zero), Rosa Vergés, Lydia Zimmermann, Laura Mañá, Carla Simón, Elena Martin and Neus Ballús.

=== Sweden ===
Ebba Lindkvist is the first Swedish woman to direct a film. In 1910 she directed the short drama, Värmländingarna, which premièred in Sweden on 27 October 1910. Another Swedish film pioneer is Anna Hofman-Uddgren who directed Stockholmsfrestelser in 1911. Swedish actress Mai Zetterling directed a number of films in the 1960s and 1970s.

A notable recent film made by a female Swedish film director, Pleasure (2021) by Ninja Thyberg, was screened at Sundance Film Festival.

=== United Kingdom ===
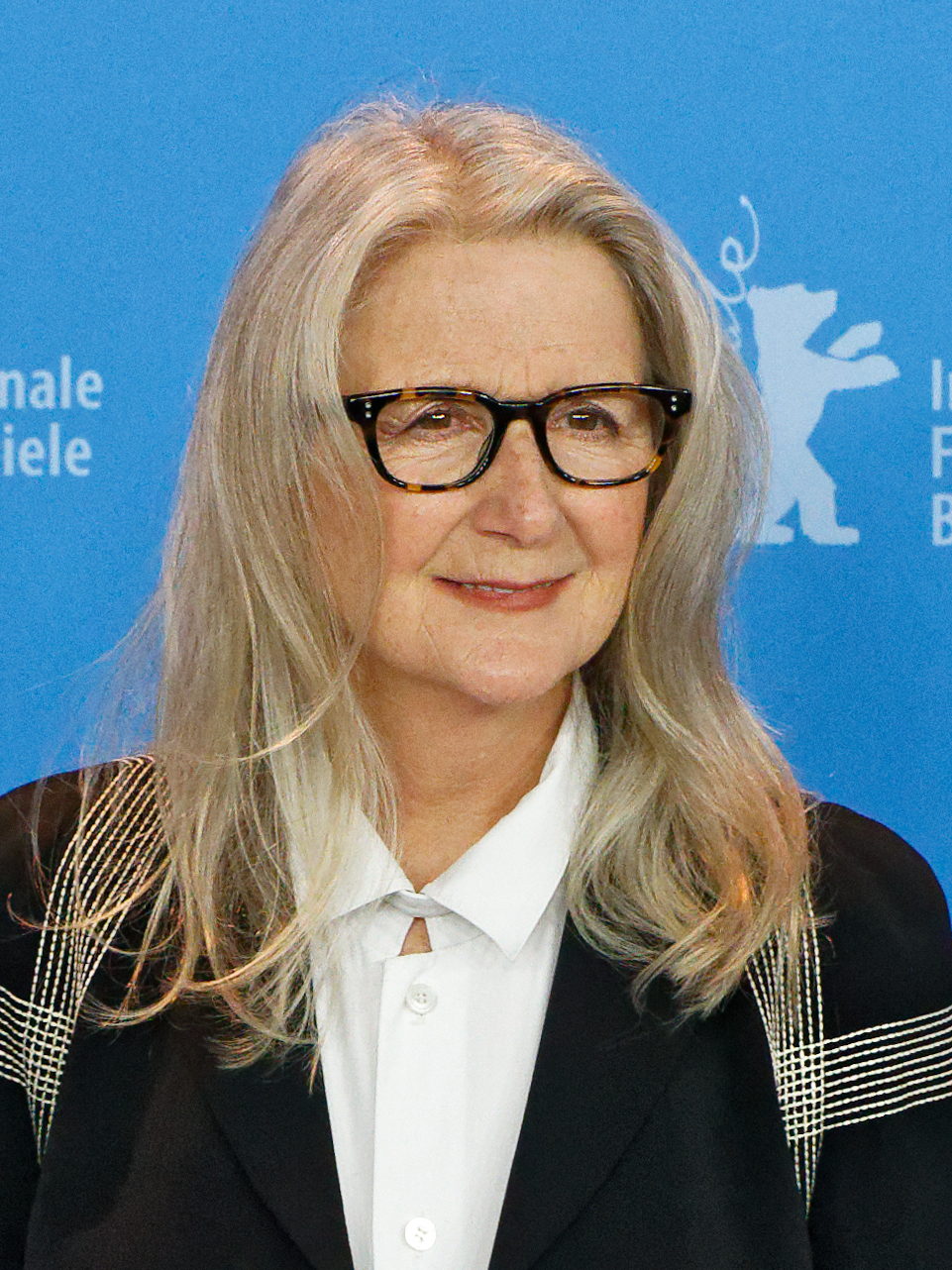
Acclaimed British film director Sally Potter

Joy Batchelor was an English animator, director, screenwriter, and producer. She married John Halas in 1940, and subsequently co-established Halas and Batchelor cartoons, whose best known production is the animated feature film Animal Farm (1954), which made her the first woman director of an animated feature since Lotte Reiniger.

Muriel Box was an English screenwriter and director, directing her first film in 1941. She was active for two decades, until the 1960s.

In Britain Jane Arden (1927–82), following up her television drama The Logic Game (1965), wrote and starred in the film Separation (Jack Bond 1967), which explores a woman's mental landscape during a marital breakup. Arden went on to be the only British woman to gain a solo feature-directing credit for The Other Side of the Underneath (1972), a disturbing study of female madness shot mainly in South Wales. Arden's overtly feminist work was neglected and almost lost until the British Film Institute rediscovered and reissued her three features, and the short Vibration (1974), in 2009.

Andrea Arnold won a 2005 Academy Award for her short film Wasp, and has won the Jury Prize at the Cannes Film Festival three times; in 2006 for Red Road, in 2009 for Fish Tank and in 2016 for American Honey.

Two of Lynne Ramsay's early short films (Small Deaths and Gasman) won the Prix du Jury at the Cannes Film Festival, and her subsequent four feature films, Ratcatcher (1999), Morvern Callar (2002), We Need to Talk About Kevin (2011), and You Were Never Really Here (2017) have all screened at the Cannes Festival.

Georgina Willis made her debut at Cannes with the independently produced controversial feminist film Watermark (2003). Watermark is about a woman who faces mental health issues and ends up killing her own child.

Mamma Mia! directed by Phyllida Lloyd became the #5 highest-grossing film of 2008 and the highest-grossing film ever in the United Kingdom. Lloyd's next film, the Margaret Thatcher biopic The Iron Lady (2012) grossed $114 million worldwide. Debbie Isitt has directed successful mainstream films, including "Confetti" and the "Nativity!" trilogy.

Cinenova is a London-based organization that distributes women produced films.

Sally Potter is a prominent British feminist film maker who made her breakthrough as director of Tilda Swinton starrer Orlando (1992). Her films regularly screen and win awards at major film festivals, including Venice Film Festival and Berlin Film Festival. Other notable films by Potter include The Party (2017), The Man Who Cried (2000) and Ginger & Rosa (2012).

British filmmakers Ngozi Onwurah and Pratibha Parmar explore the legacies of colonialism. Film director Gurinder Chadha primarily makes films about women of Indian origin living in England.

Work by British film director and writer Shamim Sarif often draws upon her own personal experience with cross cultural, non-heterosexual love. Some of her notable films include lesbian romantic drama I Can't Think Straight (2008) and Cold War espionage film Despite the Falling Snow (2016) starring Rebecca Ferguson.

Partially as a result of funding from the UK Film Council (disbanded in 2010), a new generation of British female filmmakers has emerged in the 21st-century, including Penny Woolcock, Carol Morley, Joanna Hogg, Clio Barnard, Sally El Hosaini, Amma Asante, and Tina Gharavi. Gallery artists Gillian Wearing and Sam Taylor-Wood have both moved into feature cinema, with Taylor-Wood (now Taylor-Johnson) named as director of the adaptation of Fifty Shades of Grey.

== Oceania ==
=== Australia ===
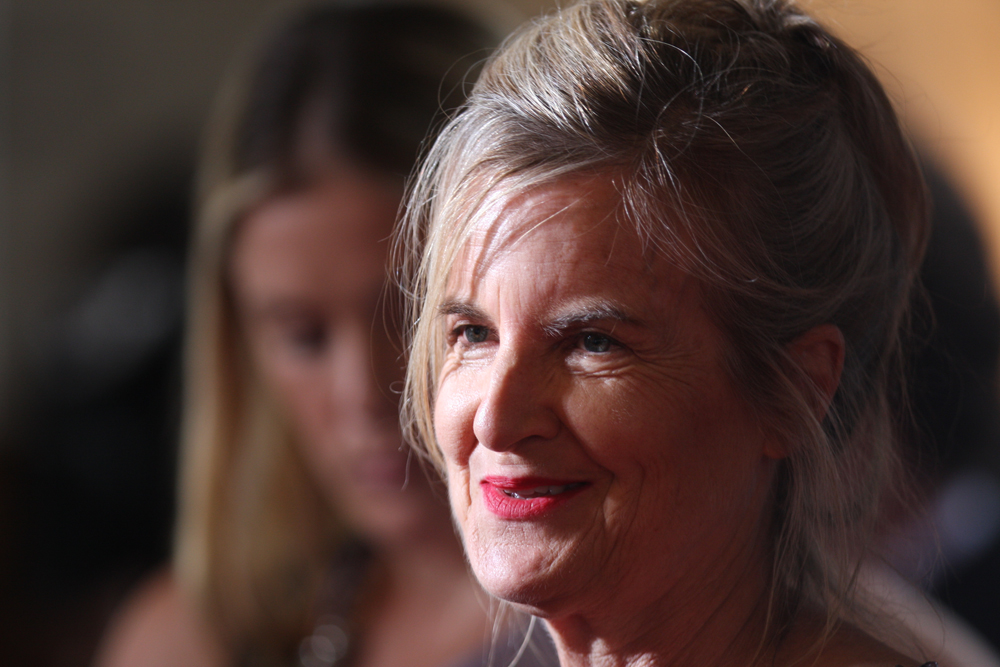
Australian film director Gillian Armstrong

Increased government funding for the film industry in Australia in the 1970s led to a renaissance in cinema, and, as part of the growing feminist movement in Australia at that time, women's cinema grew. The role of women's films was discussed at the Women's Liberation Conference in Melbourne in 1970, and groups such as the Feminist Film Workers collective (1970s and 1980s), Sydney Women"s Film Group (SWFG, 1972–), Melbourne Women's Film Group (1973–), Reel Women (1979 to 1983 in Melbourne), and Women's Film Unit (Sydney and Melbourne, 1984/5) were established. A number of filmmakers, including Jeni Thornley, Sarah Gibson, Susan Lambert, Martha Ansara, Margot Nash and Megan McMurchy, were involved in these groups. The 1975 International Women's Film Festival, the first of its kind, was initiated by the SWFG, but groups around the country organised screening events in other state capitals. In Melbourne and Sydney the festivals ran for nine days (with an audience of around 56,000), and in the other states they spanned two to three days.

Gillian Armstrong is a notable Australian filmmaker, best known for her 1979 film My Brilliant Career. Other significant Australian film directors include Jocelyn Moorhouse (The Dressmaker), Catriona McKenzie, and Kitty Green. Jill Bilcock is a world-renowned editor, about whom two documentaries have been made.

The 2020 film Brazen Hussies, a feature documentary about second-wave feminism in Australia, written and directed by Catherine Dwyer, despite having great difficulty in getting it financed, proved highly successful

=== New Zealand ===
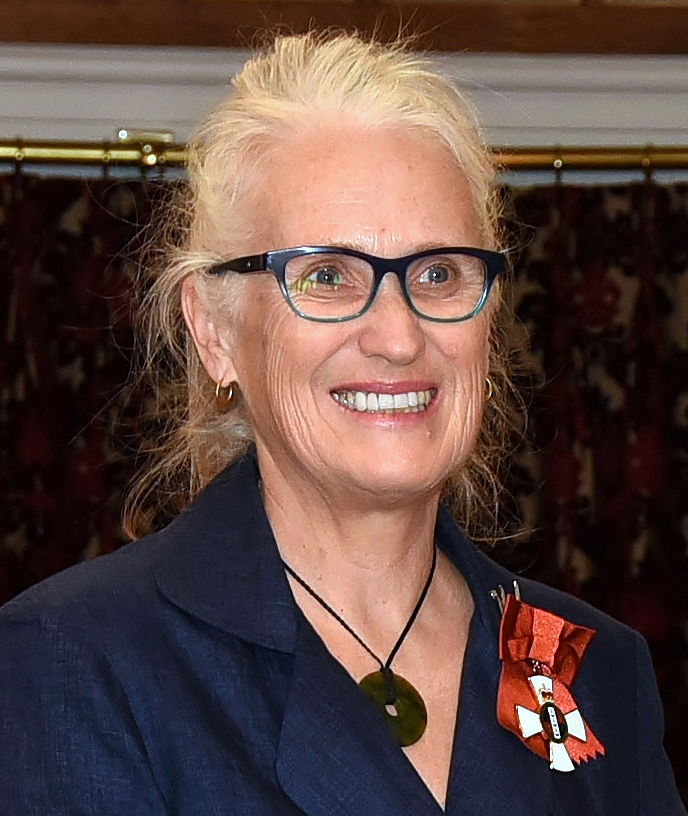
New Zealand director Jane Campion, known for her record-breaking pioneer achievements at Cannes Film Festival as a female filmmaker for her directorial role that won both Short Film Palme d'Or (for Peel) and the feature film Palme d'Or (for The Piano), making her the only filmmaker to achieve.

Jane Campion (born 1954) is the most well-known woman director from New Zealand, noted her works often with themes of feminism, sexuality, and tension between independence and submission. Her accolades throughout her career including two Academy Awards, two BAFTA Awards, two Golden Globe Awards, and a Silver Lion award, and nominations of three Primetime Emmy Awards.

For her film The Piano (1993), she received the Palme d'Or at the 1993 Cannes Film Festival and later won an Academy Award for Best Original Screenplay at the 66th Academy Awards. In 2022, Campion's direction of The Power of the Dog (2021) earned her second Best Director nod, becoming the first woman to receive multiple Best Director nominations. She also won her first Best Director win, becoming the third (and so far, most recent) female director to win it in the history of the awards ceremony..

Pietra Brettkelly (born 1985) is known for her documentaries, which include Yellow is Forbidden and A Flickering Truth.

== See also ==
- Black women filmmakers
- Feminist film theory
- List of female film and television directors
- List of films directed by women
- List of LGBT-related films directed by women
- List of women's film festivals
- Women in film
- Woman's film
- Women's suffrage in film

== Sources ==
1. Butler, Alison (2002). Women's Cinema: The Contested Screen. Wallflower Press. ISBN 978-1903364277.
2. Cohen (2012). "After the New American Cinema: Shirley Clarke's Video Work as Performance and Document". Journal of Film and Video. 64 (1–2): 57–64. doi:10.5406/jfilmvideo.64.1-2.0057. S2CID 191635595.
3. Cook, Pam; Smelik, Anneke M, eds. (2007). "Feminist Film Theory". The Cinema Book. BFI. p. 492. hdl:2066/44160. ISBN 978-1844571925.
4. El-Bushra, Judy (2008). "Feminism, Gender, and Women's Peace Activism". Gender Myths and Feminist Fables. Blackwell. pp. 127–143. doi:10.1002/9781444306675.ch7. ISBN 978-1444306675.
5. Enelow, Shonni (2017). "Stronger Together". Film Comment. 53 (5): 50–55. ProQuest 1942146879.
6. "Millions More To Get Outraged About Kathryn Bigelow's Oscar Snub As 'Zero Dark Thirty' Opens Wide". Forbes. 2013.
7. Fussell, Betty Harper (1992). Mabel: Hollywood's First I-Don't-Care Girl. Limelight. ISBN 978-0879101589.
8. Handy, Jocelyn; Rowlands, Lorraine (March 2017). "The systems psychodynamics of gendered hiring: Personal anxieties and defensive organizational practices within the New Zealand film industry". Human Relations. 70 (3): 312–338. doi:10.1177/0018726716651690. S2CID 147943279.
9. Hollows, Joanne (2000). Feminism, Femininity and Popular Culture. Manchester UP. p. 8. ISBN 978-0719043956.
10. Huffington Post (2013-01-11). "Scott Mendelson: Why Kathryn Bigelow's Oscar Snub Is a Symptom of a Larger Problem in Film Criticism". HuffPost.
11. Hu, Lidan (2 January 2017). "Rescuing female desire from revolutionary history: Chinese women's cinema in the 1980s". Asian Journal of Women's Studies. 23 (1): 49–65. doi:10.1080/12259276.2017.1279890. S2CID 218771001.
12. "'Lincoln' Leads 2013 Oscar Nominations; Bigelow Snubbed". Indiewire. 2012-10-26.
13. Jones, Deborah; Pringle, Judith K. (May 2015). "Unmanageable Inequalities: Sexism in the Film Industry". The Sociological Review. 63 (1_suppl): 37–49. doi:10.1111/1467-954x.12239. S2CID 143275862.
14. Lagercrantz, Marika V (2009). "En oavslutad berättelse. Om varietéstjärnan Anna Hofmann" [An unfinished story: About the Variety Star Anna Hofmann]. Kulturellt: Reflektioner i Erling Bjurströms anda [Cultural: Reflections in Erling Bjurströms spirit] (in Swedish). Linköping UP. pp. 186–193.
15. Lauren, Martha (2013). "The Celluloid Ceiling: Behind the Scenes Employment of Women on Top 250 Films of 2015" (PDF). Center for the Study of Women in Television and Film.
16. López, Ana (1990). "Argentina". In Kuhn, Annette (ed.). The Women's Companion to International Film. UP California. pp. 19–21. ISBN 978-0520088795.
17. Martin, Angela (1990). "Africa". In Kuhn, Annette (ed.). The Women's Companion to International Film. UP California. pp. 4–8. ISBN 978-0520088795.
18. Martinez, Pilar Rodriguez (November 2011). "Feminism and Violence: The Hegemonic Second Wave's Encounter with Rape and Domestic Abuse in USA (1970-1985)". Cultural Dynamics. 23 (3): 147–172. doi:10.1177/0921374011430566. S2CID 144556615.
19. McKinley, Rose (2016-12-01). Celluloid and Silicon Ceilings: Underinvestment in Women Directors and Entrepreneurs. Duke U School of Law. OCLC 972309987.
20. Morfoot, Addie (18 February 2016a). "Oscars: Examining Gender Bias in the Documentary Categories". Variety.
21. Mulvey, Laura (1989). Visual and Other Pleasures. New York: Palgrave. p. 120. ISBN 9780333445297.
22. Murphy, Jocelyn Nichole (2015). The role of women in film: Supporting the men – An analysis of how culture influences the changing discourse on gender representations in film (Journalism Undergraduate Honors thesis). U Arkansas, Fayetteville.
23. Nichols, Bill, ed. (2001). Maya Deren and the American avant-garde. Berkeley: California UP. ISBN 978-0520224445. OCLC 45888927.
24. "Alice Guy Blache (1873-1968)". www.nwhm.org. Education & Resources – National Women's History Museum. NWHM. 2016a. Archived from the original on 19 March 2016.
25. "Lois Weber". www.nwhm.org. Education & Resources – National Women's History Museum. NWHM. 2016b. Archived from the original on 16 March 2016.
26. Purcell, John B. K.; Oldham, C. Rebecca; Weiser, Dana A.; Sharp, Elizabeth A. (February 2017). "Lights, Camera, Activism: Using a Film Series to Generate Feminist Dialogue About Campus Sexual Violence: Lights, Camera, Activism". Family Relations. 66 (1): 139–153. doi:10.1111/fare.12228.
27. Shail, Robert (2007). British Film Directors: A Critical Guide. Carbondale: Southern Illinois UP. pp. 88–89. ISBN 978-0809328338.
28. Sharma, Alpana (January 2001). "Body matters: The politics of provocation in Mira Nair's films". Quarterly Review of Film and Video. 18 (1): 91–103. doi:10.1080/10509200109361515. S2CID 154740797.
29. Simon, Joan; Gaines, Jane; McMahan, Alison; Musser, Charles; Tomadjoglou, Kim; Williams, Alan (2009). Alice Guy Blaché Cinema Pioneer. Yale UP. ISBN 978-0300152500.
30. Smith, Stacy; Choueiti, Marc; Pieper, Katherine (2016). "Inequality in 800 Popular Films: Examining Portrayals of Gender, Race/Ethnicity, LGBT, and Disability from 2007-2015". USC Annenburg: 1–6.
31. The Guardian, Matthew Weaver (8 March 2010). "Kathryn Bigelow makes history as first woman to win best director Oscar". Archived from the original on 9 September 2013.
32. The Hollywood Reporter, Carl DiOrio (2010-01-30). "Kathryn Bigelow wins DGA Award". The Hollywood Reporter.
33. Unterburger, Amy L, ed. (1999). The St. James women filmmakers encyclopedia : women on the other side of the camera. Detroit: Visible Ink. pp. 122–124. ISBN 978-1578590926. OCLC 41086659.
34. Vance, Jeffrey (2003). "Charlie Chaplin : Chaplin at Keystone: The Tramp is Born". www.charliechaplin.com.
35. Variety, Marc Graser (2010-02-03). "'Enchanted' to see second chapter".
36. Wing-Fai, Leung; Gill, Rosalind; Randle, Keith (May 2015). "Getting in, Getting on, Getting out? Women as Career Scramblers in the UK film and Television Industries" (PDF). The Sociological Review. 63 (1_suppl): 50–65. doi:10.1111/1467-954x.12240. hdl:2299/16649. S2CID 141641004.

== Bibliography ==
=== Books ===
- Ally Acker, Reel Women. Pioneers of the Cinema. 1896 to the Present, London: B.T. Batsford 1991
- Attwood, Lynne, Ed., Red Women on the Silver Screen: Soviet Women and Cinema from the Beginning to the End of the Communist Era, London: Pandora 1993
- Jacqueline Bobo (ed.), Black Women Film and Video Artists (AFI Film Readers), Routledge 1998
- Russell Campbell, Marked Women: Prostitutes and Prostitution in the Cinema University of Wisconsin Press 2005
- Ellerson, Beti, Sisters of the screen : women of Africa on film, video and television, Trenton, New Jersey [u.a.] : Africa World Press, 2000
- Lucy Fischer, Shot/Countershot: Film Tradition and Women's Cinema, Princeton University Press 1989
- G.A. Foster, Women Film Directors (1995)
- Kenneth W. Harrow, ed., With open eyes : women and African cinema, Amsterdam [u.a.] : Rodopi, 1997 (=Matatu – Journal for African Culture and Society)
- Rebecca Hillauer, Encyclopedia of Arab Women Filmmakers, American University in Cairo Press, 2005, ISBN 977-424-943-7
- Claire Johnston, "Women's Cinema as Counter-Cinema" (1975) in: Claire Johnston (ed.), Notes on Women's Cinema, London: Society for Education in Film and Television, reprinted in: Sue Thornham (ed.), Feminist Film Theory. A Reader, Edinburgh University Press 1999, pp. 31–40
- Julia Knight, Women and the New German Cinema, Verso 1992
- Denise Lowe, An encyclopedic dictionary of women in early American films, 1895–1930, New York [u.a.] : Haworth Press, 2005
- Karen Ward Mahar, Women Filmmakers in Early Hollywood, The Johns Hopkins University Press, 2008
- Judith Mayne, The Woman at the Keyhole: Feminism and Women's Cinema, Indiana University Press 1990
- Janis L- Pallister, French-Speaking Women Film Directors: A Guide, Fairleigh Dickinson Univ Press 1998
- Sarah Projansky, Watching Rape: Film and Television in Postfeminist Culture, New York University Press 2001
- Quart, Barbara Koenig: Women Directors: The Emergence of a New Cinema, Praeger 1988
- Judith Redding, Victoria A. Brownworth, Film Fatales: Independent Women Directors, Seal Press 1997, based on interviews with 33 film makers
- Rich, B. Ruby. Chick Flicks: Theories and Memories of the Feminist Film Movement. Durham, N. C.: Duke University Press, 1998.
- Carrie Tarr with Brigitte Rollet, Cinema and the Second Sex. Women's Filmmaking in France in the 1980s and 1990s, New York, Continuum, 2001.
- Amy L. Unterburger, ed., The St. James Women Filmmakers Encyclopedia: Women on the Other Side of the Camera, Paperback, Visible Ink Press 1999
- Women Filmmakers: Refocusing, edited by Jacqueline Levitin, Judith Plessis and Valerie Raoul, Paperback Edition, Routledge 2003
- Rashkin, E. (2001). Women Filmmakers in Mexico: The Country of Which We Dream. University of Texas Press; annotated edition.

=== Journals ===
- Camera Obscura
- cléo Journal
- Frauen und Film
- Women and Film
- Jump Cut
- New German Critique
- Vertigo and Vertigo Online
