= List of films directed by women =

This is a selection of feature films directed by women directors.

== 1890s–1920s ==
- 1896 La Fée aux Choux; director: Alice Guy; one of the first narrative (fiction) films
- 1905 Esmeralda; director: Alice Guy; earliest film adaptation of The Hunchback of Notre Dame
- 1906 The Birth, the Life and the Death of Christ; director: Alice Guy
- 1906 The Consequences of Feminism; director: Alice Guy; earliest feminist film
- 1912 Algie the Miner; director: Alice Guy-Blaché (uncredited); first western directed by a woman
- 1912 Falling Leaves; director: Alice Guy-Blaché
- 1912 A Fool and His Money; director: Alice Guy-Blaché; likely the first film with an all African-American cast
- 1913 The Jew's Christmas; director: Lois Weber, co-directed with Phillips Smalley
- 1913 The Pit and the Pendulum; director: Alice Guy-Blaché; first English-language adaptation of the short story
- 1913 Suspense; director: Lois Weber, co-directed with Phillips Smalley
- 1914 The Merchant of Venice (lost film as of 2025); director: Lois Weber; the first full-length feature film directed by a woman
- 1915 An Argentine Romance (Un Romance Argentino); director: Angélica Jovita García
- 1915 Hypocrites; director: Lois Weber
- 1915 Sempre Avanti, Savoia!; director: Elvira Notari
- 1916 The Devil's Prize; director: Marguerite Bertsch
- 1916 Miss Peasant (lost film as of 2025); director: Olga Preobrazhenskaya
- 1916 Shoes; director: Lois Weber
- 1916 Where Are My Children?; director: Lois Weber, co-directed with Phillips Smalley
- 1917 '49–'17; director: Ruth Ann Baldwin
- 1917 Even As You and I; director: Lois Weber
- 1917 The Glory of Yolanda; director: Marguerite Bertsch
- 1917 The Mysterious Mrs. M; director: Lois Weber
- 1917 A Wife on Trial; director: Ruth Ann Baldwin
- 1920 La Fête espagnole; director: Germaine Dulac
- 1920 Remodeling Her Husband; director: Lillian Gish
- 1920 To Please One Woman; director: Lois Weber
- 1921 The Blot; director: Lois Weber
- 1921 Flor de España o la Leyenda de un Torero; director: Helena Cortesina
- 1921 The Good-Bad Wife; director: Vera McCord
- 1921 Just Around the Corner; director: Frances Marion
- 1921 The Love Light; director: Frances Marion
- 1921 Too Wise Wives; director: Lois Weber
- 1921 What Do Men Want?; director: Lois Weber
- 1921 What's Worth While?; director: Lois Weber
- 1922 The Smiling Madame Beudet (La Souriante Madame Beudet); director: Germaine Dulac; often cited as one of the first feminist feature films
- 1923 Salomé; director: Alla Nazimova, co-directed with Charles Bryant
- 1923 The Song of Love; director: Frances Marion
- 1925 An Orphan's Cry (孤雏悲声); director: Xie Caizhen; first female Chinese director
- 1926 The Adventures of Prince Achmed; director: Lotte Reiniger
- 1926 Bulbul-e-Paristan; director: Fatma Begum; first female Indian director
- 1926 The Marriage Clause; director: Lois Weber
- 1927 The Angel of Broadway; director: Lois Weber
- 1927 Antoinette Sabrier; director: Germaine Dulac
- 1927 The Fall of the Romanov Dynasty; director: Esfir Shub
- 1927 Fashions for Women; director: Dorothy Arzner
- 1927 Get Your Man; director: Dorothy Arzner
- 1927 Goddess of Love; director: Fatma Begum
- 1927 Laila; director: Aziza Amir
- 1927 Sensation Seekers; director: Lois Weber
- 1927 Ten Modern Commandments; director: Dorothy Arzner
- 1927 Women of Ryazan; director: Olga Preobrazhenskaya, co-directed with Ivan Pravov
- 1928 Chandravali; director: Fatma Begum
- 1928 Heer Ranjha; director: Fatma Begum
- 1928 Manhattan Cocktail; director: Dorothy Arzner
- 1928 The Seashell and the Clergyman; director: Germaine Dulac
- 1929 The Last Attraction; director: Olga Preobrazhenskaya, co-directed with Ivan Pravov
- 1929 The Wild Party; director: Dorothy Arzner

== 1930s–1940s ==
- 1930 Anybody's Woman; director: Dorothy Arzner
- 1930 Sarah and Son; director: Dorothy Arzner
- 1931 Mädchen in Uniform (Girls in uniform); director: Leontine Sagan
- 1931 The Mystery of the Black Domino (O Mistério do Dominó Preto); director: Cléo de Verberena
- 1931 Honor Among Lovers; director: Dorothy Arzner
- 1931 Working Girls; director: Dorothy Arzner
- 1932 The Blue Light (Das blaue Licht)); director: Leni Riefenstahl
- 1932 Merrily We Go to Hell; director: Dorothy Arzner
- 1933 Christopher Strong; director: Dorothy Arzner
- 1934 Nana; director: Dorothy Arzner
- 1935 Robin Hood (animated film); director: Joy Batchelor
- 1935 Triumph of the Will (Triumph des Willens); director: Leni Riefenstahl
- 1936 Craig's Wife; director: Dorothy Arzner
- 1936 New Clothing (Hatsu Sugata); director: Tazuko Sakane; first female Japanese director
- 1936 Onnenpotku; director Glory Leppänen
- 1936 Silhouettes; co-director: Lotte Reiniger
- 1937 The Bride Wore Red; director: Dorothy Arzner
- 1938 Olympia (1938 film); director: Leni Riefenstahl
- 1939 Shchors; co-director: Yuliya Solntseva
- 1940 Dance, Girl, Dance; director: Dorothy Arzner
- 1942 Derailed (Afsporet); director: Bodil Ipsen
- 1943 Meshes of the Afternoon; director: Maya Deren
- 1943 First Comes Courage; director: Dorothy Arzner
- 1944 At Land; director: Maya Deren
- 1944 Melody of Murder (Mordets Melodi)); director: Bodil Ipsen
- 1944 Possession (Besættelse); director: Bodil Ipsen
- 1944 Woman is the Wild Card; director: Ansa Ikonen
- 1945 The Red Meadows; co-director: Bodil Ipsen
- 1945 Três Dias Sem Deus; director: Bárbara Virgínia
- 1946 Ritual in Transfigured Time; director: Maya Deren
- 1947 De Pokkers Unger; co-director: Astrid Henning-Jensen
- 1947 Wedding Night (Bröllopsnatten); director: Bodil Ipsen
- 1948 Kristinus Bergman; co-director: Astrid Henning-Jensen
- 1949 Fedakar Ana; director: Cahide Sonku
- 1949 Gigi; director: Jacqueline Audry
- 1949 The Lost People; director: Muriel Box
- 1949 Not Wanted; director: Ida Lupino
- 1949 Never Fear; director: Ida Lupino

== 1950s–1960s ==
- 1950 Outrage; director: Ida Lupino, the first Hollywood studio feature directed by a woman after Dorothy Arzner's films
- 1951 Hard, Fast and Beautiful; director: Ida Lupino
- 1951 Olivia; director: Jacqueline Audry
- 1951 Streetwalker; director: Matilde Landeta
- 1952 The Happy Family; director: Muriel Box
- 1953 The Bigamist; director: Ida Lupino
- 1953 The Hitch-Hiker; director: Ida Lupino, the first film noir directed by a woman
- 1953 Love Letter; director: Kinuyo Tanaka
- 1953 Street Corner; director Muriel Box
- 1954 Animal Farm; co-director: Joy Batchelor
- 1954 The Teckman Mystery; director: Wendy Toye
- 1955 All for Mary; director: Wendy Toye
- 1955 The Eternal Breasts; director: Kinuyo Tanaka
- 1955 The Moon Has Risen; director: Kinuyo Tanaka
- 1955 La Pointe Courte; director: Agnès Varda
- 1955 Raising a Riot; director: Wendy Toye
- 1956 Together; director: Lorenza Mazzetti
- 1957 Life Flows Quietly By...; director: Binka Zhelyazkova
- 1957 True as a Turtle; director: Wendy Toye
- 1958 Poem of the Sea; director: Yuliya Solntseva
- 1959 Bridges Go-Round; director: Shirley Clarke
- 1959 Paw; director: Astrid Henning-Jensen
- 1960 The Wandering Princess; director: Kinuyo Tanaka
- 1961 Chronicle of Flaming Years; director: Yuliya Solntseva
- 1961 Cléo from 5 to 7 (Cléo de 5 à 7); director: Agnès Varda
- 1961 The Connection; director Shirley Clarke
- 1961 Een blandt mange; director: Astrid Henning-Jensen
- 1961 Girls of the Night; director: Kinuyo Tanaka
- 1961 The Golden Calf; director: Ritva Arvelo
- 1962 Love Under the Crucifix; director: Kinuyo Tanaka
- 1962 Les Petits Matins; director: Jacqueline Audry
- 1962 We Joined the Navy; director: Wendy Toye
- 1963 El Camino; director: Ana Mariscal
- 1963 The House is Black; director: Forough Farrokhzad
- 1963 The Lizards; director: Lina Wertmüller
- 1964 The Cool World; director: Shirley Clarke
- 1964 The Enchanted Desna; director: Yuliya Solntseva
- 1964 Älskande par (Loving Couples); director: Mai Zetterling
- 1965 Le Bonheur; director: Agnes Varda
- 1965 The East is Red; director: Wang Ping
- 1965 Let's Talk About Shafei (Questa Volta Parliamo di Uomini); director: Lina Wertmüller
- 1966 Blood Bath; director: Stephanie Rothman
- 1966 Daisies (Sedmikrasky); director: Věra Chytilová
- 1966 Night Games (Nattlek); director: Mai Zetterling
- 1966 Rita the Mosquito; director: Lina Wertmüller
- 1966 Wings; director: Larissa Shepitko
- 1967 Brief Encounters; director: Kira Muratova
- 1967 Don't Sting the Mosquito; director: Lina Wertmüller
- 1967 My Love, My Love; director: Nadine Trintignant
- 1967 Portrait of Jason; director Shirley Clarke
- 1968 The Belle Starr Story; director: Lina Wertmüller
- 1968 Doctor Glas; director: Mai Zetterling
- 1968 The Girls (Flickorna); director: Mai Zetterling
- 1968 Rat Life and Diet in North America; director: Joyce Wieland
- 1969 Duet for Cannibals; director: Susan Sontag
- 1969 A Very Curious Girl (La Fiancée du Pirate); director: Nelly Kaplan
- 1969 The Year of the Cannibals; director: Liliana Cavani

== 1970s ==
- 1970 The Dark Side of Tomorrow; director: Barbara Peeters
- 1970 Wanda; director: Barbara Loden
- 1971 Brother Carl; director: Susan Sontag
- 1971 Bury Me an Angel; director: Barbara Peeters
- 1971 For Women: Chapter 1 (Für Frauen: 1. Kapitel); director: Cristina Perincioli – documentary fiction on a women's strike in Berlin
- 1971 It Only Happens to Others; director: Nadine Trintignant
- 1971 Juguemos en el mundo; director: María Herminia Avellaneda
- 1971 The Guest (L'ospite); director: Liliana Cavani
- 1971 The Long Farewell; director: Kira Muratova
- 1971 A New Leaf; director: Elaine May
- 1971 The Woman's Film; directors: Louise Alaimo, Judy Smith
- 1972 Dream Life; director: Mireille Dansereau
- 1972 Faustine et le Bel Été; director: Nina Companeez
- 1972 The Heartbreak Kid; director: Elaine May
- 1972 The Other Side of the Underneath; director Jane Arden
- 1972 Sambizanga; director: Sarah Maldoror – feature film about the liberation movement in Angola
- 1972 The Seduction of Mimi; director: Lina Wertmüller
- 1972/73 Es kommt darauf an, sie zu verändern; director: Claudia von Alemann – organised women workers discuss the possibilities for change
- 1973 The Edifying and Joyous Story of Colinot; director: Nina Companeez
- 1973 Hollywood 90028; director: Christina Hornisher
- 1973 Milarepa; director: Liliana Cavani
- 1974 The Hour of Liberation Has Arrived ; director: Heiny Srour
- 1974 I, You, He, She (Je Tu Il Elle); director: Chantal Akerman
- 1974 The Night Porter (Il Portiere di Notte); director: Liliana Cavani
- 1974 Summer School Teachers; director: Barbara Peeters
- 1975 Adoption; director: Márta Mészáros
- 1975 Anna und Edith; writers: Cristina Perincioli and Cäcilia Rentmeister – first feature film in German TV ZDF on a lesbian relationship
- 1975 Before the Time Comes; director: Anne Claire Poirier
- 1975 Catherine & Co.; director: Catherine Breillat
- 1975 Hester Street; director: Joan Micklin Silver
- 1975 Letter from My Village (Kaddy Bekat – Lettre Paysanne); director: Safi Faye
- 1975 Legacy; director: Karen Arthur
- 1975 The Lost Honor of Katharina Blum (Die Verlorene Ehre der Katharina Blum oder: Wie Gewalt entstehen und wohin sie führen kann); directors: Margarethe von Trotta and Volker Schlöndorff
- 1975 The Other Half of the Sky: A China Memoir; directors: Shirley MacLaine, Claudia Weill
- 1975 Seven Beauties (Pasqualino settebellezze); director: Lina Wertmüller; the first time a woman was nominated for an Academy Award for directing a feature film
- 1976 The Absence; director: Brigitte Sauriol
- 1976 The Far Shore; director: Joyce Wieland
- 1976 Harlan County, USA; director: Barbara Kopple
- 1976 Jeanne Dielman; director: Chantal Akerman
- 1976 Mikey and Nicky; director: Elaine May
- 1976 Not a Pretty Picture; director: Martha Coolidge
- 1976 A Real Young Girl; director: Catherine Breillat
- 1977 The Ascent; director: Larissa Shepitko
- 1977 Beyond Good and Evil; director: Liliana Cavani
- 1977 First Love; director: Joan Darling
- 1977 News from Home; director: Chantal Akerman
- 1977 One Sings, the Other Doesn't; director: Agnes Varda
- 1977 Les Rendez-vous d'Anna; director: Chantal Akerman
- 1977 Starhops; director: Barbara Peeters
- 1977 The Two of Them; director: Márta Mészáros
- 1978 But what do they want, after all? (Mais qu'est ce qu'elles veulent?); director: Coline Serreau
- 1978 The All-Around Reduced Personality – Outtakes (Die allseitig reduzierte Persönlichkeit – Redupers); director: Helke Sander
- 1978 Getting to Know the Big, Wide World; director: Kira Muratova
- 1978 Girlfriends; director: Claudia Weill
- 1978 Just like Home; director: Márta Mészáros
- 1978 The Mafu Cage; director: Karen Arthur
- 1978 The Power of Men is the Patience of Women (Die Macht der Männer ist die Geduld der Frauen); writer, director, producer: Cristina Perincioli; (ZDF TV) feature film/documentary fiction on domestic violence
- 1978 Rabbit Test; director: Joan Rivers
- 1979 Anti-Clock; writer and co-director Jane Arden
- 1979 Daughter Rite; director: Michelle Citron; a feminist pseudo-documentary which deconstructs the conventions of Direct Cinema
- 1979 Germany Pale Mother (Deutschland bleiche Mutter); director: Helma Sanders-Brahms
- 1979 Heartbreak; director: Mireille Dansereau
- 1979 Provincial Actors (Aktorzy prowincjonalni); director: Agnieszka Holland
- 1979 My Brilliant Career; director: Gillian Armstrong
- 1979 A Scream from Silence; director: Anne Claire Poirier
- 1979 Ticket of No Return (Bildnis einer Trinkerin); director: Ulrike Ottinger

== 1980s ==
- 1980 Brutal; director: Marilou Diaz-Abaya
- 1980 Can't Stop the Music; director: Nancy Walker
- 1980 Fatso; director: Anne Bancroft
- 1980 The Godsend; director: Gabrielle Beaumont
- 1980 The Handyman; director: Micheline Lanctôt
- 1980 The Heiresses; director: Márta Mészáros
- 1980 Humanoids from the Deep; director: Barbara Peeters
- 1980 It Can't Be Winter, We Haven't Had Summer Yet; director: Louise Carré
- 1980 It's My Turn; director: Claudia Weill
- 1980 The Life and Times of Rosie the Riveter; director: Connie Field
- 1980 Rosa de lejos; director: María Herminia Avellaneda
- 1980 Sparsh; director: Sai Paranjpye
- 1981 36 Chowringhee Lane; director: Aparna Sen
- 1981 Death of a Centerfold; director: Gabrielle Beaumont
- 1981 The Decline of Western Civilization; director: Penelope Spheeris
- 1981 Eight Minutes to Midnight: A Portrait of Dr. Helen Caldicott; director: Mary Benjamin
- 1981 Fever (Gorączka); director: Agnieszka Holland
- 1981 The German Sisters; director: Margarethe von Trotta
- 1981 A Lonely Woman (Kobieta samotna); director: Agnieszka Holland; originally released in 1981 but banned in Poland until 1987
- 1981 The Skin (La Pelle); director: Liliana Cavani
- 1982 All Night Long (Toute une nuit); director: Chantal Akerman
- 1982 Beyond the Door (Oltre la Porta); director: Liliana Cavani
- 1982 Beyond Forty; director: Anne Claire Poirier
- 1982 Fast Times at Ridgemont High; director: Amy Heckerling
- 1982 Grease 2; director: Patricia Birch
- 1982 Moral; director: Marilou Diaz-Abaya
- 1982 Starstruck; director: Gillian Armstrong
- 1983 A 20th Century Chocolate Cake; director: Lois Siegel
- 1983 Among Grey Stones; director: Kira Muratova
- 1983 Born in Flames; director: Lizzie Borden
- 1983 The Gold Diggers; director: Sally Potter
- 1983 Of the Flesh (Karnal); director: Marilou Diaz-Abaya
- 1983 Just a Game; director: Brigitte Sauriol
- 1983 Valley Girl; director: Martha Coolidge
- 1983 Variety; director: Bette Gordon
- 1983 Yentl; director: Barbra Streisand; first woman to win a Golden Globe for direction
- 1984 Diary for My Children; director: Márta Mészáros
- 1984 Joy of Sex; director: Martha Coolidge
- 1984 Mrs. Soffel; director: Gillian Armstrong
- 1984 Sonatine; director: Micheline Lanctôt
- 1984 A Woman in Transit; director: Léa Pool
- 1985 Angry Harvest (Bittere Ernte); director: Agnieszka Holland
- 1985 The Berlin Affair; director: Liliana Cavani
- 1985 The Care Bears Movie; director: Arna Selznick
- 1985 The Cosmic Eye; director: Faith Hubley
- 1985 Desert Hearts; director: Donna Deitch
- 1985 Desperately Seeking Susan; director: Susan Seidelman
- 1985 My American Cousin; director: Sandy Wilson
- 1985 Next Summer; director: Nadine Trintignant
- 1985 Real Genius; director: Martha Coolidge
- 1985 Seduction: The Cruel Woman (Verführung: die grausame Frau); directors: Elfi Mikesch, Monika Treut
- 1985 Smooth Talk; director Joyce Chopra
- 1985 Vagabond; director: Agnes Varda
- 1986 Anne Trister; director: Léa Pool
- 1986 Children of a Lesser God; director: Randa Haines
- 1986 Early Spring; director: Astrid Henning-Jensen
- 1986 Golden Eighties; director: Chantal Akerman
- 1986 Jumpin' Jack Flash (film); director: Penny Marshall
- 1986 Loyalties; director: Anne Wheeler
- 1986 The Morning Man; director: Danièle J. Suissa
- 1986 The Wake; director: Norma Bailey
- 1986 Working Girls; director: Lizzie Borden
- 1987 The Chipmunk Adventure; director: Janice Karman
- 1987 Diary for My Lovers; director: Márta Mészáros
- 1987 Deaf to the City; director: Mireille Dansereau
- 1987 He's My Girl; director: Gabrielle Beaumont
- 1987 High Tide; director: Gillian Armstrong
- 1987 I've Heard the Mermaids Singing; director: Patricia Rozema
- 1987 Ishtar; director: Elaine May
- 1987 Marie in the City; director: Marquise Lepage
- 1987 Near Dark; director: Kathryn Bigelow
- 1988 36 Fillette; director: Catherine Breillat
- 1988 Agnes Escapes from the Nursing Home; director: Eileen O'Meara
- 1988 Big; director: Penny Marshall
- 1988 Chocolat; director Claire Denis
- 1988 Cowboys Don't Cry; director: Anne Wheeler
- 1988 Kalih Films (Kali-Filme); directors: Birgit Hein and Wilhelm Hein
- 1988 Little Dorrit; director: Christine Edzard
- 1988 Love, Women, and Flowers (Amor, Mujeres, y Flores); directors: Marta Rodriguez and Jorge Silva (Colombia)
- 1988 Martha, Ruth and Edie; director: Deepa Mehta, Norma Bailey and Danièle J. Suissa
- 1988 Plain Clothes; director: Martha Coolidge
- 1988 Permanent Record; director: Marisa Silver
- 1988 Salaam Bombay!; director: Mira Nair
- 1988 Straight for the Heart; director: Léa Pool
- 1988 To Kill a Priest; director: Agnieszka Holland
- 1988 Virgin Machine (Die Jungfrauenmaschine); director: Monika Treut
- 1989 American Boyfriends; director: Sandy Wilson
- 1989 American Stories: Food, Family and Philosophy (Histoires d'Amérique); director: Chantal Akerman
- 1989 The Asthenic Syndrome; director: Kira Muratova
- 1989 Bye Bye Blues; director: Anne Wheeler
- 1989 A Dry White Season; director: Euzhan Palcy
- 1989 Francesco; director: Liliana Cavani
- 1989 Laura Laur; director: Brigitte Sauriol
- 1989 Pet Sematary; director: Mary Lambert
- 1989 Salut Victor; director: Anne Claire Poirier
- 1989 Sweetie; director Jane Campion

== 1990s ==
- 1990 An Angel at My Table; director: Jane Campion
- 1990 The Company of Strangers; director: Cynthia Scott
- 1990 Diary for My Father and Mother; director: Márta Mészáros
- 1990 Europa, Europa; director: Agnieszka Holland
- 1990 The Lemon Sisters; director: Joyce Chopra
- 1990 No Fear, No Die; director: Claire Denis
- 1990 Paris is Burning; director: Jennie Livingston
- 1990 White Room; director: Patricia Rozema
- 1991 American Dream; director: Barbara Kopple
- 1991 Better Than Chocolate; director: Anne Wheeler
- 1991 Danzón; director: Maria Novaro
- 1991 Daughters of the Dust; director: Julie Dash
- 1991 Fires Within; director: Gillian Armstrong
- 1991 Night and Day (Nuit et Jour); director: Chantal Akerman
- 1991 A Place of Rage; director: Pratibha Parmar
- 1991 Point Break; director Kathryn Bigelow
- 1991 The Prince of Tides; director: Barbra Streisand
- 1991 Proof; director: Jocelyn Moorhouse
- 1991 Rambling Rose; director: Martha Coolidge
- 1991 Sam & Me; director: Deepa Mehta
- 1991 The Savage Woman; director: Léa Pool
- 1991 Thousand Pieces of Gold; director: Nancy Kelly
- 1992 Bordertown Café; director: Norma Bailey
- 1992 Gas Food Lodging; director: Allison Anders
- 1992 Harmony Cats; director: Sandy Wilson
- 1992 History and Memory: For Akiko and Takashige; director Rea Tajiri
- 1992 The Last Days of Chez Nous; director: Gillian Armstrong
- 1992 A League of Their Own; director: Penny Marshall
- 1992 Little Noises; director: Jane Spencer
- 1992 Olivier, Olivier; director: Agnieszka Holland
- 1992 Orlando; director: Sally Potter
- 1992 Seeing Red; director: Virginia Rouse
- 1992 Wayne's World; director: Penelope Spheeris
- 1993 Bhaji on the Beach; director: Gurinder Chadha
- 1993 Lost in Yonkers; director: Martha Coolidge
- 1993 The Secret Garden; director: Agnieszka Holland
- 1993 Sleepless in Seattle; director: Nora Ephron
- 1993 Two Can Play; director: Micheline Lanctôt
- 1993 Where Are You? I'm Here (Dove Siete? Io Sono Qui); director: Liliana Cavani
- 1994 Angie; director: Martha Coolidge
- 1994 Black Beauty; director: Caroline Thompson
- 1994 Camilla; director: Deepa Mehta
- 1994 Complaints of a Dutiful Daughter; director: Deborah Hoffmann
- 1994 Desire in Motion; director: Léa Pool
- 1994 Foetus; director: Márta Mészáros
- 1994 A Hero's Life; director: Micheline Lanctôt
- 1994 I Can't Sleep; director: Claire Denis
- 1994 Little Women; director: Gillian Armstrong
- 1994 Mi Vida Loca; director: Allison Anders
- 1994 The Piano; director: Jane Campion, the second time a woman was nominated for an Academy Award for directing a feature film
- 1994 River of Grass; director: Kelly Reichardt
- 1995 Antonia's Line; director: Marleen Gorris; Academy Award for best foreign film, the first time awarded to a female film director
- 1995 At all costs (Coûte que coûte); director: Claire Simon
- 1995 Billy Madison; director: Tamra Davis
- 1995 Clueless, director: Amy Heckerling
- 1995 Party Girl; director: Daisy von Scherler Mayer; first feature film to premiere on the Internet
- 1995 The Seventh Room; director: Márta Mészáros
- 1995 Strange Days; director: Kathryn Bigelow
- 1995 Three Wishes; director: Martha Coolidge
- 1995 Total Eclipse; director: Agnieszka Holland
- 1995 When Night Is Falling; director: Patricia Rozema
- 1996 A Couch in New York (Un divan à New York); director: Chantal Akerman
- 1996 Fire; director: Deepa Mehta
- 1996 Foxfire; director: Annette Haywood-Carter
- 1996 I Shot Andy Warhol; director: Mary Harron
- 1996 The Mirror Has Two Faces; director: Barbra Streisand
- 1996 Nénette and Boni; director: Claire Denis
- 1996 The Portrait of a Lady; director Jane Campion
- 1996 Unstrung Heroes; director: Diane Keaton
- 1996 White Men Are Cracking Up; director: Ngozi Onwurah
- 1997 Oscar and Lucinda; director: Gillian Armstrong
- 1997 Out to Sea; director: Martha Coolidge
- 1997 The Peacemaker; director: Mimi Leder
- 1997 Strawberry Fields; director: Rea Tajiri
- 1997 The Tango Lesson; director: Sally Potter
- 1997 Washington Square; director: Agnieszka Holland
- 1998 Deep Impact, director: Mimi Leder
- 1998 Earth; director: Deepa Mehta
- 1998 Free Tibet, director: Sarah Pirozek
- 1998 Half Baked; director: Tamra Davis
- 1998 High Art; director: Lisa Cholodenko
- 1998 It's Your Turn, Laura Cadieux; director: Denise Filiatrault
- 1998 Julie and Me; director: Jeanne Crépeau
- 1998 Madeline; director: Daisy von Scherler Mayer
- 1998 The Parent Trap; director: Nancy Meyers
- 1998 That Strange Person, director: Eileen O'Meara
- 1998 Woo; director: Daisy von Scherler Mayer
- 1999 Beau Travail; director: Claire Denis
- 1999 Boys Don't Cry; director: Kimberly Peirce
- 1999 But I'm a Cheerleader; director: Jamie Babbit
- 1999 The Green Elephant; director: Svetlana Baskova
- 1999 Holy Smoke!; director: Jane Campion
- 1999 Mansfield Park; director: Patricia Rozema
- 1999 Romance; director: Catherine Breillat
- 1999 Set Me Free; director: Léa Pool
- 1999 The Third Miracle; director: Agnieszka Holland
- 1999 Titus; director: Julie Taymor
- 1999 The Virgin Suicides; director: Sophia Coppola

== 2000s ==
=== 2000 ===
- 2000 American Psycho; director: Mary Harron
- 2000 The Captive; director: Chantal Akerman
- 2000 Geography of Fear; director: Auli Mantila
- 2000 Girlfight; director: Karyn Kusama
- 2000 The Gleaners and I; director: Agnes Varda
- 2000 Loser; director: Amy Heckerling
- 2000 Love & Basketball; director: Gina Prince-Bythewood
- 2000 The Man Who Cried; director: Sally Potter
- 2000 Marine Life; director: Anne Wheeler
- 2000 Pay It Forward; director: Mimi Leder
- 2000 Suspicious River; director: Lynne Stopkewich
- 2000 The Weight of Water; director: Kathryn Bigelow
- 2000 What Women Want; director: Nancy Meyers

=== 2001 ===
- 2001 Brief Crossing; director: Catherine Breillat
- 2001 Charlotte Gray; director: Gillian Armstrong
- 2001 La Ciénaga; director: Lucrecia Martel
- 2001 Fat Girl; director: Catherine Breillat
- 2001 Lost and Delirious; director: Léa Pool
- 2001 Lovely & Amazing; director: Nicole Holofcener
- 2001 Lovely Rita; director: Jessica Hausner
- 2001 Monsoon Wedding; director: Mira Nair
- 2001 Nowhere in Africa; director: Caroline Link
- 2001 Rain; director: Christine Jeffs
- 2001 Rain; director: Katherine Lindberg
- 2001 Replay; director: Catherine Corsini
- 2001 Shrek; co-director: Vicky Jenson
- 2001 Suddenly Naked; director: Anne Wheeler
- 2001 Trouble Every Day; director: Claire Denis

=== 2002 ===
- 2002 Bark!; director: Katarzyna Adamik
- 2002 Bend It Like Beckham; director: Gurinder Chadha
- 2002 Blue Car; director: Karen Moncrieff
- 2002 Bollywood/Hollywood; director: Deepa Mehta
- 2002 Divine Secrets of the Ya-Ya Sisterhood; director: Callie Khouri
- 2002 Five Bottles of Vodka; director: Svetlana Baskova
- 2002 Frida; director: Julie Taymor
- 2002 The Guru; director: Daisy von Scherler Mayer
- 2002 Julie Walking Home; director: Agnieszka Holland
- 2002 Laurel Canyon; director: Lisa Cholodenko
- 2002 Ripley's Game; director: Liliana Cavani
- 2002 Sex Is Comedy; director: Catherine Breillat
- 2002 Vendredi soir; director: Claire Denis
- 2002 Whale Rider; director: Niki Caro

=== 2003 ===
- 2003 At Five in the Afternoon; director: Samira Makhmalbaf
- 2003 The Forest for the Trees; director: Maren Ade
- 2003 The Head; director: Svetlana Baskova
- 2003 In the Cut; director: Jane Campion
- 2003 Juniper Tree; director: Micheline Lanctôt
- 2003 Lost in Translation; director: Sofia Coppola; the third time a woman was nominated for an Academy Award for directing
- 2003 Monster; director: Patty Jenkins
- 2003 Nousukausi; director: Johanna Vuoksenmaa
- 2003 The Republic of Love; director: Deepa Mehta
- 2003 Something's Gotta Give; director: Nancy Meyers
- 2003 Sylvia; director: Christine Jeffs
- 2003 Take My Eyes; director: Icíar Bollaín
- 2003 Thirteen; director: Catherine Hardwicke
- 2003 The Very Merry Widows; director: Catherine Corsini
- 2003 Virgin; director: Deborah Kampmeier

=== 2004 ===
- 2004 Anatomy of Hell; director: Catherine Breillat
- 2004 The Blue Butterfly; director: Léa Pool
- 2004 Bride and Prejudice; director: Gurinder Chadha
- 2004 Cavedweller; director: Lisa Cholodenko
- 2004 Confessions of a Teenage Drama Queen; director: Sara Sugarman
- 2004 Dear Frankie; director: Shona Auerbach
- 2004 D.E.B.S.; director: Angela Robinson
- 2004 Down to the Bone; director: Debra Granik
- 2004 Goddess: How I fell in Love; director: Renata Litvinova
- 2004 The Holy Girl; director: Lucrecia Martel
- 2004 Hotel; director: Jessica Hausner
- 2004 The Intruder; director: Claire Denis
- 2004 Mars; director: Anna Melikyan
- 2004 The Prince & Me; director: Martha Coolidge
- 2004 Somersault; director: Cate Shortland
- 2004 Speak; director: Jessica Sharzer
- 2004 Tomorrow We Move (Demain on déménage); director: Chantal Akerman
- 2004 The Unburied Man; director: Márta Mészáros
- 2004 Vanity Fair; director: Mira Nair
- 2004 The Woodsman; director: Nicole Kassell
- 2004 Yes; director: Sally Potter

=== 2005 ===
- 2005 Æon Flux; director: Karyn Kusama
- 2005 The Ballad of Jack and Rose; director: Rebecca Miller
- 2005 Born into Brothels; director: Zana Briski co-directed with Ross Kauffman
- 2005 Close to Home, directors: Dalia Hager and Vidi Bilu
- 2005 Herbie: Fully Loaded; director: Angela Robinson
- 2005 Look Both Ways; director: Sarah Watt
- 2005 Lords of Dogtown; director: Catherine Hardwicke
- 2005 North Country; director: Niki Caro
- 2005 The Notorious Bettie Page; director: Mary Harron
- 2005 On a Clear Day; director: Gaby Dellal
- 2005 The Prize Winner of Defiance, Ohio; director: Jane Anderson
- 2005 Sisters of '77; director: Cynthia Salzman Mondell co-directed with Allen Mondell
- 2005 Water; director: Deepa Mehta
- 2005 The Wedding Date; director: Clare Kilner

=== 2006 ===
- 2006 Aquamarine; director: Elizabeth Allen Rosenbaum
- 2006 Away from Her; director: Sarah Polley
- 2006 Blood Tea and Red String; director: Christiane Cegavske
- 2006 Copying Beethoven; director: Agnieszka Holland
- 2006 Day Night Day Night; director: Julia Loktev
- 2006 The Dead Girl; director: Karen Moncrieff
- 2006 Diggers; director: Katherine Dieckmann
- 2006 Friends with Money; director: Nicole Holofcener
- 2006 The Holiday; director: Nancy Meyers
- 2006 Marie Antoinette; director: Sofia Coppola
- 2006 Material Girls; director: Martha Coolidge
- 2006 Old Joy; director: Kelly Reichardt
- 2006 Piter FM; director: Oksana Bychkova
- 2006 Red Road; director: Andrea Arnold
- 2006 Sherrybaby; director: Laurie Collyer
- 2006 Stick It; director: Jessica Bendinger

=== 2007 ===
- 2007 Across the Universe; director: Julie Taymor
- 2007 All Is Forgiven; director: Mia Hansen-Løve
- 2007 Death Defying Acts; director: Gillian Armstrong
- 2007 Hounddog; director: Deborah Kampmeier
- 2007 I Could Never Be Your Woman; director: Amy Heckerling
- 2007 The Last Mistress; director: Catherine Breillat
- 2007 Mermaid; director: Anna Melikyan
- 2007 Never Forever; director: Gina Kim
- 2007 The Savages; director: Tamara Jenkins
- 2007 Things We Lost in the Fire; director: Susanne Bier
- 2007 Waitress; director: Adrienne Shelly
- 2007 Water Lilies; director: Céline Sciamma

=== 2008 ===
- 2008 35 Shots of Rum; director: Claire Denis
- 2008 Angus, Thongs and Perfect Snogging; director: Gurinder Chadha
- 2008 The Beaches of Agnes; director: Agnes Varda
- 2008 Everybody Dies but Me; director: Valeriya Gai Germanika
- 2008 Frozen River; director: Courtney Hunt
- 2008 The Headless Woman; director: Lucrecia Martel
- 2008 Heaven on Earth; director: Deepa Mehta
- 2008 The Hurt Locker; director: Kathryn Bigelow; the first woman to win an Academy Award for directing
- 2008 Kit Kittredge: An American Girl; director: Patricia Rozema
- 2008 Mamma Mia!; director: Phyllida Lloyd
- 2008 Mommy Is at the Hairdresser's; director: Léa Pool
- 2008 Ricky Rapper; director: Mari Rantasila
- 2008 Stop-Loss; director: Kimberly Peirce
- 2008 Sunshine Cleaning; director: Christine Jeffs
- 2008 Surveillance; director: Jennifer Lynch
- 2008 The Toe Tactic; director: Emily Hubley
- 2008 Twilight; director: Catherine Hardwicke
- 2008 Wendy and Lucy; director: Kelly Reichardt

=== 2009 ===
- 2009 Amelia; director: Mira Nair
- 2009 Bluebeard; director: Catherine Breillat
- 2009 Bright Star; director: Jane Campion
- 2009 Cold Souls; director: Sophie Barthes
- 2009 An Education; director: Lone Scherfig
- 2009 Everyone Else; director: Maren Ade
- 2009 Father of My Children; director: Mia Hansen-Løve
- 2009 Fish Tank; director: Andrea Arnold
- 2009 It's Complicated; director: Nancy Meyers
- 2009 Janosik: A True Story; director: Agnieszka Holland and Kasia Adamik
- 2009 Jennifer's Body; director: Karyn Kusama
- 2009 Julie & Julia; director Nora Ephron
- 2009 Leaving; director Catherine Corsini
- 2009 Lourdes; director: Jessica Hausner
- 2009 Motherhood; director: Katherine Dieckmann
- 2009 My Year Without Sex; director: Sarah Watt
- 2009 One Foot Under; director: Johanna Vuoksenmaa
- 2009 The Private Lives of Pippa Lee; director: Rebecca Miller
- 2009 Rage; director: Sally Potter
- 2009 Ricky Rapper and the Bicycle Thief; director: Mari Rantasila
- 2009 Suzie; director: Micheline Lanctôt
- 2009 Whip It; director: Drew Barrymore
- 2009 White Material; director: Claire Denis

== 2010s ==
=== 2010 ===
- 2010 Denizen; director: J.A. Steel
- 2010 The Freebie; director: Katie Aselton
- 2010 The High Cost of Living; director: Deborah Chow
- 2010 I Will Follow; director: Ava DuVernay
- 2010 The Kids Are All Right; director: Lisa Cholodenko
- 2010 The Last Escape; director: Léa Pool
- 2010 Meek's Cutoff; director; Kelly Reichardt
- 2010 A Montreal Girl; director: Jeanne Crépeau
- 2010 Nanny McPhee and the Big Bang; director: Susanna White
- 2010 Night Catches Us; director: Tanya Hamilton
- 2010 Please Give; director: Nicole Holofcener
- 2010 Ramona and Beezus; director: Elizabeth Allen Rosenbaum
- 2010 The Runaways; director: Floria Sigismondi
- 2010 Somewhere; director: Sofia Coppola
- 2010 The Tempest; director: Julie Taymor
- 2010 The Whistleblower; director: Larysa Kondracki
- 2010 Winter's Bone; director: Debra Granik

=== 2011 ===
- 2011 A Little Bit of Heaven; director: Nicole Kassell
- 2011 Almayer's Folly (La Folie Almayer); director: Chantal Akerman
- 2011 The Fatherless; director: Marie Kreutzer
- 2011 For the Love of God; director: Micheline Lanctôt
- 2011 Goodbye First Love; director Mia Hansen-Løve
- 2011 Higher Ground; director: Vera Farmiga
- 2011 Hysteria; director: Tanya Wexler
- 2011 In Darkness (W ciemności); director: Agnieszka Holland
- 2011 In the Land of Blood and Honey; director: Angelina Jolie
- 2011 Knockout; director: Anne Wheeler
- 2011 The Loneliest Planet; director: Julia Loktev
- 2011 The Moth Diaries; director: Mary Harron
- 2011 The Off Hours; director: Megan Griffiths
- 2011 One Day; director: Lone Scherfig
- 2011 Pariah; director: Dee Rees
- 2011 Red Riding Hood; director: Catherine Hardwicke
- 2011 Return; director: Liza Johnson
- 2011 Sengadal; director: Leena Manimekalai
- 2011 The Storage; director Taru Mäkelä
- 2011 Take This Waltz; director: Sarah Polley
- 2011 Tomboy; director: Céline Sciamma
- 2011 Two Days; director: Avdotya Smirnova
- 2011 We Need to Talk About Kevin; director: Lynne Ramsay
- 2011 Wuthering Heights; director: Andrea Arnold
- 2011 Yelling to the Sky; director: Victoria Mahoney
- 2011 Your Sister's Sister; director: Lynn Shelton

=== 2012 ===
- 2012 Black Rock; director: Katie Aselton
- 2012 Breaking the Girls; director: Jamie Babbit
- 2012 Chained; director: Jennifer Lynch
- 2012 Eden; director: Megan Griffiths
- 2012 Frenemies; director: Daisy von Scherler Mayer
- 2012 Ginger & Rosa; director: Sally Potter
- 2012 Kiss of the Damned; director: Alexandra Cassavetes
- 2012 Middle of Nowhere; director: Ava DuVernay
- 2012 Midnight's Children; director: Deepa Mehta
- 2012 The Reluctant Fundamentalist; director: Mira Nair
- 2012 Saving Face; director: Sharmeen Obaid-Chinoy
- 2012 Seeking a Friend for the End of the World; director: Lorene Scafaria
- 2012 Stories We Tell; director: Sarah Polley
- 2012 Three World; director: Catherine Corsini
- 2012 Vamps; director: Amy Heckerling
- 2012 Wadjda; director: Haifaa al-Mansour; first female Saudi Arabian director
- 2012 Zero Dark Thirty; director: Kathryn Bigelow

=== 2013 ===
- 2013 21 Ways to Ruin a Marriage; director: Johanna Vuoksenmaa
- 2013 A Teacher; director: Hannah Fidell
- 2013 August Fools; director: Taru Mäkelä
- 2013 Abuse of Weakness; director: Catherine Breillat
- 2013 Bastards; director: Claire Denis
- 2013 Best Friends Forever; director: Brea Grant
- 2013 The Bling Ring; director: Sofia Coppola
- 2013 Butter on the Latch; director: Josephine Decker
- 2013 Carrie; director Kimberly Peirce
- 2013 Concussion; director: Stacie Passon
- 2013 Desert Runners; director: Jennifer Steinman
- 2013 Elektro Moskva; director: Elena Tikhonova
- 2013 Enough Said; director: Nicole Holofcener
- 2013 Final Recipe; director: Gina Kim
- 2013 Frozen; director: Jennifer Lee, co-directed with Chris Buck
- 2013 Hateship, Loveship; director: Liza Johnson
- 2013 It Felt Like Love; director: Eliza Hittman
- 2013 Lucky Them; director: Megan Griffiths
- 2013 Night Moves; director: Kelly Reichardt
- 2013 Palo Alto; director: Gia Coppola
- 2013 Peeples; director: Tina Gordon Chism
- 2013 Plush; director: Catherine Hardwicke
- 2013 The Pretty One; director: Jenée LaMarque
- 2013 Some Girl(s); director: Daisy von Scherler Mayer
- 2013 Soulmate; director: Axelle Carolyn
- 2013 Sunlight Jr.; director: Laurie Collyer
- 2013 The To Do List; director: Maggie Carey
- 2013 Touchy Feely; director: Lynn Shelton

=== 2014 ===
- 2014 A Girl Walks Home Alone at Night: director: Ana Lily Amirpour
- 2014 Amour Fou: director: Jessica Hausner
- 2014 Appropriate Behavior; director: Desiree Akhavan
- 2014 The Babadook; director: Jennifer Kent
- 2014 Drunktown's Finest; director: Sydney Freeland
- 2014 Dukhtar; director: Afia Nathaniel
- 2014 Eden; director; Mia Hansen-Løve
- 2014 Girlhood; director: Celine Sciamma
- 2014 Honeymoon; director: Leigh Janiak
- 2014 I Believe in Unicorns; director: Leah Meyerhoff
- 2014 Kelly & Cal; director: Jen McGowan
- 2014 Laggies; director: Lynn Shelton
- 2014 Madame Bovary; director: Sophie Barthes
- 2014 Miss Meadows; director: Karen Leigh Hopkins
- 2014 Obvious Child; director: Gillian Robespierre
- 2014 The Riot Club; director: Lone Scherfig
- 2014 Selma; director: Ava DuVernay
- 2014 The Sleepwalker; director: Mona Fastvold
- 2014 Thou Wast Mild and Lovely director: Josephine Decker
- 2014 Unbroken; director: Angelina Jolie
- 2014 The Voices; director: Marjane Satrapi
- 2014 Welcome to Me; director: Shira Piven
- 2014 The Wonders: director: Alice Rohrwacher

=== 2015 ===
- 2015 3 Bahadur; director: Sharmeen Obaid-Chinoy
- 2015 3 Generations; director: Gaby Dellal
- 2015 6 Years; director: Hannah Fidell
- 2015 The Adderall Diaries; director: Pamela Romanowsky
- 2015 Addicted to Fresno; director: Jamie Babbit
- 2015 Adult Camp; director: Johanna Vuoksenmaa
- 2015 Advantageous; director: Jennifer Phang
- 2015 Bare; director: Natalia Leite
- 2015 Beeba Boys; director: Deepa Mehta
- 2015 By the Sea; director: Angelina Jolie
- 2015 Careful What You Wish For; director: Elizabeth Allen Rosenbaum
- 2015 The Diary of a Teenage Girl; director: Marielle Heller
- 2015 The Dressmaker; director: Jocelyn Moorhouse
- 2015 Good Morning Karachi; director: Sabiha Sumar
- 2015 Gruber Is Leaving; director: Marie Kreutzer
- 2015 The Handout; director: Micheline Lanctôt
- 2015 The Intern; director: Nancy Meyers
- 2015 Into the Forest; director: Patricia Rozema
- 2015 The Invitation; director: Karyn Kusama
- 2015 Maggie's Plan; director: Rebecca Miller
- 2015 Meadowland; director: Reed Morano
- 2015 The Meddler; director: Lorene Scafaria
- 2015 Miss You Already; director: Catherine Hardwicke
- 2015 Mustang; director: Deniz Gamze Ergüven
- 2015 The Passion of Augustine; director: Léa Pool
- 2015 Sleeping With Other People; director: Leslye Headland
- 2015 Songs My Brothers Taught Me; director: Chloé Zhao
- 2015 Suffragette; director: Sarah Gavron
- 2015 Summertime; director: Catherine Corsini
- 2015 Traumfrauen; director: Anika Decker

=== 2016 ===
- 2016 9; director: Micheline Lanctôt
- 2016 Always Shine; director: Sophia Takal
- 2016 American Honey, director: Andrea Arnold
- 2016 Anatomy of Violence; director: Deepa Mehta
- 2016 The Bad Batch; director: Ana Lily Amirpour
- 2016 Carrie Pilby; director: Susan Johnson
- 2016 Certain Women; director: Kelly Reichardt
- 2016 The Edge of Seventeen; director: Kelly Fremon Craig
- 2016 Elvis & Nixon; director: Liza Johnson
- 2016 In the Radiant City; director: Rachel Lambert
- 2016 The Love Witch; director: Anna Biller
- 2016 Me Before You; director: Thea Sharrock
- 2016 The Night Stalker; director: Megan Griffiths
- 2016 Our Kind of Traitor; director: Susanna White
- 2016 Prevenge; director: Alice Lowe
- 2016 Queen of Katwe; director: Mira Nair
- 2016 Raw; director: Julia Ducournau
- 2016 Sami Blood; director: Amanda Kernell
- 2016 SMS für Dich; director: Karoline Herfurth
- 2016 Strange Weather; director: Katherine Dieckmann
- 2016 Their Finest; director: Lone Scherfig
- 2016 Things to Come; director: Mia Hansen-Love
- 2016 Toni Erdmann; director: Maren Ade
- 2016 A United Kingdom; director: Amma Asante
- 2016 We Used to Be Cool; director: Marie Kreutzer
- 2016 White Girl; director: Elizabeth Wood
- 2016 Window Horses; director: Ann Marie Fleming
- 2016 The Whole Truth; director: Courtney Hunt
- 2016 Women Who Kill; director: Ingrid Jungermann

=== 2017 ===
- 2017 Band Aid; director: Zoe Lister-Jones
- 2017 Beach Rats; director: Eliza Hittman
- 2017 The Beguiled; director: Sofia Coppola
- 2017 Berlin Syndrome; director: Cate Shortland
- 2017 The Boy Downstairs; director: Sophie Brooks
- 2017 Deidra & Laney Rob a Train; director: Sydney Freeland
- 2017 Detroit; director: Kathryn Bigelow
- 2017 The Feels; director Jenée LaMarque
- 2017 Faces Places; director: Agnès Varda
- 2017 First they Killed My Father; director: Angelina Jolie
- 2017 The Institute; director: Pamela Romanowsky, co-directed with James Franco
- 2017 Kayak to Klemtu; director: Zoe Leigh Hopkins
- 2017 The Keeping Hours; director: Karen Moncrieff
- 2017 Lady Bird; director: Greta Gerwig
- 2017 Landline; director: Gillian Robespierre
- 2017 Lemon; director: Janicza Bravo
- 2017 Let the Sunshine In; director: Claire Denis
- 2017 Little Pink House; director: Courtney Balaker
- 2017 M.F.A.; director: Natalia Leite
- 2017 Mary Shelley; director: Haifaa al-Mansour
- 2017 Maya Dardel; director: Magdalena Zyzak
- 2017 Never Steady, Never Still; director: Kathleen Hepburn
- 2017 Novitiate; director: Maggie Betts
- 2017 Outside In; director: Lynn Shelton
- 2017 The Party; director: Sally Potter
- 2017 Professor Marston and the Wonder Women; director: Angela Robinson
- 2017 Revenge; director: Coralie Fargeat
- 2017 The Rider; director: Chloé Zhao
- 2017 Rough Night; director: Lucia Aniello
- 2017 Spoor (Pokot); director: Agnieszka Holland
- 2017 The Wasting; director: Carolyn Saunders
- 2017 Woman Walks Ahead; director: Susanna White
- 2017 Wonder Woman; director: Patty Jenkins
- 2017 Worst Case, We Get Married; director: Léa Pool
- 2017 You Were Never Really Here; director: Lynne Ramsay
- 2017 The Zookeeper's Wife; director: Niki Caro

=== 2018 ===
- 2018 All About Nina; director: Eva Vives
- 2018 An Impossible Love; director: Catherine Corsini
- 2018 Being Frank; director: Miranda Bailey
- 2018 Blockers; director: Kay Cannon
- 2018 Can You Ever Forgive Me?; director: Marielle Heller
- 2018 Charlie Says; director: Mary Harron
- 2018 Dead Pigs; director: Cathy Yan
- 2018 Destroyer; director: Karyn Kusama
- 2018 Falls Around Her; director: Darlene Naponse
- 2018 Family; director: Laura Steinel
- 2018 First Match; director: Olivia Newman
- 2018 Furlough; director: Laurie Collyer
- 2018 Galveston; director: Mélanie Laurent
- 2018 Happier Times, Grump; director: Tiina Lymi
- 2018 Happy as Lazzaro; director: Alice Rohrwacher
- 2018 High Life; director: Claire Denis
- 2018 Holiday; director: Isabella Eklöf
- 2018 Honey Bee; director: Kathleen Hepburn
- 2018 I Think We're Alone Now; director: Reed Morano
- 2018 Ladyworld; director: Amanda Kramer
- 2018 The Land of Steady Habits; director: Nicole Holofcener
- 2018 Leave No Trace; director: Debra Granik
- 2018 Little Woods; director: Nia DaCosta
- 2018 The Long Dumb Road; director: Hannah Fidell
- 2018 M; director: Anna Eriksson
- 2018 Madeline's Madeline; director: Josephine Decker
- 2018 The Man Who Surprised Everyone; director Natasha Merkulova
- 2018 Mary Queen of Scots; director: Josie Rourke
- 2018 Maya; director: Mia Hansen-Løve
- 2018 The Miseducation of Cameron Post; director: Desiree Akhavan
- 2018 Mouthpiece; director: Patricia Rozema
- 2018 Nancy; director: Christina Choe
- 2018 Nappily Ever After; director: Haifaa al-Mansour
- 2018 Never Goin' Back; director: Augustine Frizzell
- 2018 The New Romantic; director: Carly Stone
- 2018 Night Comes On; director: Jordana Spiro
- 2018 The Nightingale; director: Jennifer Kent
- 2018 On the Basis of Sex; director: Mimi Leder
- 2018 Ophelia; director: Claire McCarthy
- 2018 Private Life; director: Tamara Jenkins
- 2018 Rust Creek; director: Jen McGowan
- 2018 Sadie; director: Megan Griffiths
- 2018 Skate Kitchen; director: Crystal Moselle
- 2018 The Spy Who Dumped Me; director: Susanna Fogel
- 2018 State Like Sleep; director: Meredith Danluck
- 2018 Story of One Appointment; director: Avdotya Smirnova
- 2018 Swingers; director Pamela Tola
- 2018 Treat Me Like Fire; director: Marie Monge
- 2018 We Have Always Lived in the Castle; director: Stacie Passon
- 2018 What They Had; director: Elizabeth Chomko
- 2018 The Wind; director: Emma Tammi
- 2018 A Wrinkle in Time; director: Ava DuVernay

=== 2019 ===
- 2019 A Beautiful Day in the Neighborhood; director: Marielle Heller
- 2019 A Way of Life; director: Micheline Lanctôt
- 2019 Always Be My Maybe; director: Nahnatchka Khan
- 2019 Apapacho; director: Marquise Lepage
- 2019 Atlantics; director: Mati Diop
- 2019 Babyteeth; director: Shannon Murphy
- 2019 Black Christmas; director: Sophia Takal
- 2019 Black Conflux; director: Nicole Dorsey
- 2019 Blinded by the Light; director: Gurinder Chadha
- 2019 Body at Brighton Rock; director: Roxanne Benjamin
- 2019 The Body Remembers When the World Broke Open; director: Elle-Máijá Tailfeathers and Kathleen Hepburn
- 2019 Booksmart; director: Olivia Wilde
- 2019 Buffaloed; director: Tanya Wexler
- 2019 Captain Marvel; director: Anna Boden, co-directed with Ryan Fleck
- 2019 Carmilla; director: Emily Harris
- 2019 Caviar; director: Elena Tikhonova
- 2019 Clemency; director: Chinonye Chukwu
- 2019 The Farewell; director: Lulu Wang
- 2019 First Cow; director: Kelly Reichardt
- 2019 Frozen II; director: Jennifer Lee, co-directed with Chris Buck
- 2019 The Ground Beneath My Feet; director: Marie Kreutzer
- 2019 Harriet; director: Kasi Lemmons
- 2019 Hustlers; director: Lorene Scafaria
- 2019 I'll Find You; director: Martha Coolidge
- 2019 Instinct; director: Halina Reijn
- 2019 Judy and Punch; director: Mirrah Foulkes
- 2019 The Kindness of Strangers; director: Lone Scherfig
- 2019 Knives and Skin; director: Jennifer Reeder
- 2019 Little Joe; director: Jessica Hausner
- 2019 Little; director: Tina Gordon Chism
- 2019 Little Women; director: Greta Gerwig
- 2019 Miss Bala; director: Catherine Hardwicke
- 2019 Mr. Jones; director: Agnieszka Holland
- 2019 The Other Lamb; director: Małgorzata Szumowska
- 2019 Paradise Hills; director: Alice Waddington
- 2019 The Perfect Candidate; director: Haifaa al-Mansour
- 2019 Portrait of a Lady on Fire; director: Celine Sciamma
- 2019 Queen & Slim; director: Melina Matsoukas
- 2019 Queen of the Morning Calm; director: Gloria Ui Young Kim
- 2019 Radioactive; director: Marjane Satrapi
- 2019 Red Snow; director: Marie Clements
- 2019 Rocks; director: Sarah Gavron
- 2019 Saint Maud; director: Rose Glass
- 2019 Satanic Panic; director: Chelsea Stardust
- 2019 The Souvenir; director: Joanna Hogg
- 2019 Sweethearts; director: Karoline Herfurth
- 2019 Sword of Trust; director: Lynn Shelton
- 2019 System Crasher; director: Nora Fingscheidt
- 2019 To the Stars; director: Martha Stephens
- 2019 The Wall of Mexico; director: Magdalena Zyzak
- 2019 When I'm a Moth; director: Magdalena Zyzak
- 2019 Yes, God, Yes; director: Karen Maine

== 2020s ==
- 2020 Amulet; director: Romola Garai
- 2020 Berlin, Berlin – Der Film; director: Franziska Meyer Price
- 2020 Between Waves; director: Virginia Abramovich
- 2020 Birds of Prey; director: Cathy Yan
- 2020 The Broken Hearts Gallery; director: Natalie Krinsky
- 2020 Charlatan (Šarlatán); director: Agnieszka Holland
- 2020 Charter; director: Amanda Kernell
- 2020 The Craft: Legacy; director: Zoe Lister-Jones
- 2020 The Curse of Willow Song; director: Karen Lam
- 2020 Emma; director: Autumn de Wilde
- 2020 Father of the Bride Part 3(ish); director: Nancy Meyers
- 2020 The Forty-Year-Old Version; director: Rahda Blank
- 2020 Funny Boy; director: Deepa Mehta
- 2020 The Glorias; director: Julie Taymor
- 2020 The High Note; director: Nisha Ganatra
- 2020 Holler; director: Nicole Riegel
- 2020 I'm Your Woman; director: Julia Hart
- 2020 Kajillionaire; director: Miranda July
- 2020 Ladies of Steel; director: Pamela Tola
- 2020 Lucky; director: Natasha Kermani
- 2020 Lorelei; director: Sabrina Doyle
- 2020 Mainstream; director: Gia Coppola
- 2020 Misbehaviour; director: Philippa Lowthorpe
- 2020 Monkey Beach; director: Loretta Todd
- 2020 Mulan; director: Niki Caro
- 2020 Never Rarely Sometimes Always; director: Eliza Hittman
- 2020 Nomadland; director: Chloé Zhao
- 2020 The Old Guard; director: Gina Prince-Bythewood
- 2020 One Night in Miami...; director: Regina King
- 2020 Promising Young Woman; director: Emerald Fennell
- 2020 Quo Vadis, Aida?; director: Jasmila Žbanić
- 2020 Relic; director: Natalie Erika James
- 2020 The Rhythm Section; director: Reed Morano
- 2020 The Roads Not Taken; director: Sally Potter
- 2020 Tove; director: Zaida Bergroth
- 2020 She Dies Tomorrow; director: Amy Seimetz
- 2020 Shirley; director: Josephine Decker
- 2020 Shiva Baby; director: Emma Seligman
- 2020 The Three; director: Anna Melikian
- 2020 What We Wanted; director: Ulrike Kofler
- 2020 Wonder Woman 1984; director: Patty Jenkins
- 2020 The World to Come; director: Mona Fastvold

=== 2021 ===
- 2021 70 Is Just a Number; director: Johanna Vuoksenmaa
- 2021 A Mouthful of Air; director: Amy Koppelman
- 2021 Bergman Island; director: Mia Hansen-Løve
- 2021 Black Widow; director: Cate Shortland
- 2021 Candyman; director: Nia DaCosta
- 2021 Captain Volkonogov Escaped; director: Natasha Merkulova
- 2021 Censor; director: Prano Bailey-Bond
- 2021 CODA; director: Siân Heder
- 2021 The Divide; director: Catherine Corsini
- 2021 Earwig; director: Lucile Hadžihalilović
- 2021 Eternals; director: Chloé Zhao
- 2021 The Fallout; director: Megan Park
- 2021 Gerda; director: Natalya Kudryashova
- 2021 Happening; director: Audrey Diwan
- 2021 I'm Your Man; director: Maria Schrader
- 2021 The Lost Daughter; director: Maggie Gyllenhaal
- 2021 The Manor; director: Axelle Carolyn
- 2021 Mark, Mary & Some Other People; director: Hannah Marks
- 2021 The Matrix Resurrections; director: Lana Wachowski
- 2021 Mayday; director: Karen Cinorre
- 2021 Mona Lisa and the Blood Moon; director: Ana Lily Amirpour
- 2021 Mothering Sunday; director: Eva Husson
- 2021 Night Raiders; director: Danis Goulet
- 2021 The North Wind; director: Renata Litvinova
- 2021 The Novice; director: Lauren Hadaway
- 2021 Petite Maman; director: Celine Sciamma
- 2021 Pleasure; director: Ninja Thyberg
- 2021 The Power of the Dog; director: Jane Campion
- 2021 Quarantine; director: Diana Ringo
- 2021 Run Woman Run; director: Zoe Leigh Hopkins
- 2021 She Will; director: Charlotte Colbert
- 2021 Silent Night; director: Camille Griffin
- 2021 Stellar; director: Darlene Naponse
- 2021 The Story of My Wife; director: Ildikó Enyedi
- 2021 Sweetheart; director: Marley Morrison
- 2021 Titane; director: Julia Ducournau
- 2021 Together Together; director: Nikole Beckwith
- 2021 Unclenching the Fists; director: Kira Kovalenko
- 2021 Violet; director: Justine Bateman
- 2021 Wolf; director: Nathalie Biancheri
- 2021 Yuni; director: Kamila Andini
- 2021 Zola; director: Janicza Bravo

=== 2022 ===
- 2022 Aftersun; director: Charlotte Wells
- 2022 Alice, Darling; director: Mary Nighy
- 2022 Amanda; director: Carolina Cavalli
- 2022 Aristotle and Dante Discover the Secrets of the Universe; director: Aitch Alberto
- 2022 Batata; director: Noura Kevorkian
- 2022 Bodies Bodies Bodies; director: Halina Reijn
- 2022 Bones of Crows; director: Marie Clements
- 2022 Both Sides of the Blade; director: Claire Denis
- 2022 Continue; director: Nadine Crocker
- 2022 Corsage; director: Marie Kreutzer
- 2022 Dalíland; director: Mary Harron
- 2022 Deadstream; director: Vanessa Winters, co-directed with Joseph Winters
- 2022 Don't Make Me Go; director: Hannah Marks
- 2022 Emily; director: Frances O'Connor
- 2022 Fire of Love; director: Sara Dosa
- 2022 Fresh; director: Mimi Cave
- 2022 Girl Picture; director: Alli Haapasalo
- 2022 Glorious; director: Rebekah McKendry
- 2022 Good Luck to You, Leo Grande; director: Sophie Hyde
- 2022 Hatching; director: Hanna Bergholm
- 2022 Just Something Nice; director: Karoline Herfurth
- 2022 Mack & Rita; director: Katie Aselton
- 2022 Montreal Girls; director: Patricia Chica
- 2022 Next Exit; director: Mali Elfman
- 2022 North of Normal; director: Carly Stone
- 2022 Piggy; director: Carlota Pereda
- 2022 Please Baby Please; director: Amanda Kramer
- 2022 Purple Hearts; director: Elizabeth Allen Rosenbaum
- 2022 Saint Omer; director: Alice Diop
- 2022 She Said; director: Maria Schrader
- 2022 Showing Up; director: Kelly Reichardt
- 2022 Sissy; director: Hannah Barlow, co-directed with Kane Senes
- 2022 The Sky Is Everywhere; director: Josephine Decker
- 2022 Slash/Back; director: Nyla Innuksuk
- 2022 Sneakerella; director: Elizabeth Allen Rosenbaum
- 2022 Stars at Noon; director: Claire Denis
- 2022 The Swearing Jar; director: Lindsay MacKay
- 2022 Till; director: Chinonye Chukwu
- 2022 Turning Red; director: Domee Shi
- 2022 Umma; director: Iris K. Shim
- 2022 Watcher; director: Chloe Okuno
- 2022 When Time Got Louder; director: Connie Cocchia
- 2022 Where the Crawdads Sing; director: Olivia Newman
- 2022 Women Talking; director: Sarah Polley
- 2022 Wunderschön; director: Karoline Herfurth

=== 2023 ===
- 2023 1984; director: Diana Ringo
- 2023 A Thousand and One; director: A.V. Rockwell
- 2023 About My Father; director: Laura Terruso
- 2023 All Dirt Roads Taste of Salt; director: Raven Jackson
- 2023 Anatomy of a Fall; director: Justine Triet
- 2023 Are You There God? It's Me, Margaret.; director: Kelly Fremon Craig
- 2023 Barbie; director: Greta Gerwig
- 2023 Birth/Rebirth; director: Laura Moss
- 2023 Bleeding Love; director: Emma Westenberg
- 2023 Bottoms; director: Emma Seligman
- 2023 Café Daughter; director: Shelley Niro
- 2023 Cocaine Bear; director: Elizabeth Banks
- 2023 Days of Happiness; director: Chloé Robichaud
- 2023 Desperation Road; director: Nadine Crocker
- 2023 The End We Start From; director: Mahalia Belo
- 2023 Family Time; director: Tia Kouvo
- 2023 Fair Play; director: Chloe Domont
- 2023 Fancy Dance; director: Erica Tremblay
- 2023 Finality of Dusk; director: Madison Thomas
- 2023 Five Nights at Freddy's; director: Emma Tammi
- 2023 Green Border (Zielona Granica); director: Agnieszka Holland
- 2023 Homecoming; director: Catherine Corsini
- 2023 How to Have Sex; director: Molly Manning Walker
- 2023 Howdy, Neighbor!; director: Allisyn Snyder
- 2023 Jeanne du Barry; director: Maïwenn
- 2023 Joy Ride; director: Adele Lim
- 2023 La chimera; director: Alice Rohrwacher
- 2023 Lee; director: Ellen Kuras
- 2023 Lovely, Dark, and Deep; director: Teresa Sutherland
- 2023 Mafia Mamma; director: Catherine Hardwicke
- 2023 The Marvels; director: Nia DaCosta
- 2023 The Order of Time; director: Liliana Cavani
- 2023 Past Lives; director: Celine Song
- 2023 Perpetrator; director: Jennifer Reeder
- 2023 The Pod Generation; director: Sophie Barthes
- 2023 Polarized; director: Shamim Sarif
- 2023 Polite Society; director: Nida Manzoor
- 2023 Praise This; director: Tina Gordon Chism
- 2023 Priscilla; director: Sofia Coppola
- 2023 Rye Lane; director: Raine Allen-Miller
- 2023 Saltburn; director: Emerald Fennell
- 2023 Scrambled; director: Leah McKendrick
- 2023 Scrapper; director: Charlotte Regan
- 2023 Sometimes I Think About Dying; director: Rachel Lambert
- 2023 The Starling Girl; director: Laurel Parmet
- 2023 There's Something Wrong with the Children; director: Roxanne Benjamin
- 2023 Totally Killer; director: Nahnatchka Khan
- 2023 Tuesday; director: Daina O. Pusić
- 2023 Unseen; director: Yoko Okumura
- 2023 Woman of the Hour; director: Anna Kendrick
- 2023 The Worst Idea Ever; director: Pamela Tola
- 2023 You Hurt My Feelings; director: Nicole Holofcener

=== 2024 ===
- 2024 All We Imagine as Light; director: Payal Kapadia
- 2024 Apartment 7A; director: Natalie Erika James
- 2024 Babygirl; director: Halina Reijn
- 2024 Back to Black; director: Sam Taylor-Johnson
- 2024 Beautiful Rebel; director: Cinzia Torrini
- 2024 Bird; director: Andrea Arnold
- 2024 The Black Sea; director: Crystal Moselle
- 2024 Blink Twice; director: Zoë Kravitz
- 2024 Bouchra; director: Meriem Bennani
- 2024 Can I Get a Witness?; director: Ann Marie Fleming
- 2024 Dreams in Nightmares; director: Shatara Michelle Ford
- 2024 The Fire Inside; director: Rachel Morrison
- 2024 The First Omen; director: Arkasha Stevenson
- 2024 Hotel Silence; director: Léa Pool
- 2024 Humane; director: Caitlin Cronenberg
- 2024 The Last Showgirl; director: Gia Coppola
- 2024 Lisa Frankenstein; director: Zelda Williams
- 2024 Love in the Big City; director: E.oni
- 2024 Love Lies Bleeding; director: Rose Glass
- 2024 Madame Web; director: S. J. Clarkson
- 2024 Miller's Girl; director: Jade Halley Bartlett
- 2024 Moana 2; director: Dana Ledoux Miller, co-directed with David Derrick Jr. & Jason Hand
- 2024 Mr. K; director Tallulah H. Schwab
- 2024 My Name Is Dingo; director: Mari Rantasila
- 2024 My Old Ass; director: Megan Park
- 2024 My Undesirable Friends: Part I — Last Air in Moscow; director: Julia Loktev
- 2024 Nightbitch; director: Marielle Heller
- 2024 The Outrun; director: Nora Fingscheidt
- 2024 Rez Ball; director: Sydney Freeland
- 2024 Stolen; director: Elle Márjá Eira
- 2024 Stormskerry Maja; director: Tiina Lymi
- 2024 The Substance; director: Coralie Fargeat
- 2024 Suncoast; director: Laura Chinn
- 2024 Toxic; director: Saulė Bliuvaitė
- 2024 Venom: The Last Dance; director: Kelly Marcel
- 2024 The Watchers; director: Ishana Night Shyamalan
- 2024 Without Blood; director: Angelina Jolie
- 2024 Your Monster; director: Caroline Lindy

=== 2025 ===
- 2025 100 Sunset; director: Kunsang Kyirong
- 2025 After Dreaming; director: Christine Haroutounian
- 2025 Akashi; director: Mayumi Yoshida
- 2025 Alpha; director: Julia Ducournau
- 2025 Atropia; director: Hailey Gates
- 2025 Bad Girl; director: Varsha Bharath
- 2025 Bad Influence; director: Chloé Wallace
- 2025 Bird in Hand; director: Melody C. Roscher
- 2025 Bunnylovr; director: Katarina Zhu
- 2025 By Design; director: Amanda Kramer
- 2025 Calle Málaga; director: Maryam Touzani
- 2025 Couples Weekend; director: Nora Kirkpatrick
- 2025 Couture; director: Alice Winocour
- 2025 The Crazy Empress; director: Radda Novikova
- 2025 The Curse of Modigliani; director Diana Ringo
- 2025 Dead Lover; director: Grace Glowicki
- 2025 Die My Love; director: Lynne Ramsay
- 2025 Eleanor the Great; director: Scarlett Johansson
- 2025 Find Your Friends; director: Izabel Pakzad
- 2025 Five Nights at Freddy's 2; director: Emma Tammi
- 2025 For Worse; director: Amy Landecker
- 2025 Forastera; director: Lucía Aleñar
- 2025 Forge; director: Jing Ai Ng
- 2025 Franz; director: Agnieszka Holland
- 2025 Freakier Friday; director: Nisha Ganatra
- 2025 Fucktoys; director: Annapurna Sriram
- 2025 Girlfriends; director: Tracy Choi
- 2025 The Good Daughter; director: Júlia de Paz Solvas
- 2025 Goodbye June; director: Kate Winslet
- 2025 H Is for Hawk; director: Philippa Lowthorpe
- 2025 Hamnet; director: Chloé Zhao
- 2025 Hedda; director: Nia DaCosta
- 2025 Honey Bunch; director: Madeleine Sims-Fewer
- 2025 Honeyjoon; director: Lilian T. Mehrel
- 2025 Hot Milk; director: Rebecca Lenkiewicz
- 2025 A House of Dynamite; director: Kathryn Bigelow
- 2025 Hurricanna; director: Francesca Gregorini
- 2025 I Live Here Now; director: Julie Pacino
- 2025 The Ice Tower; director: Lucile Hadžihalilović
- 2025 Idiotka; director: Nastasya Popov
- 2025 If I Had Legs I'd Kick You; director: Mary Bronstein
- 2025 Islands; director: Marina Seresesky
- 2025 The Journey to Gyeongju; director: Kim Mi-jo
- 2025 KPop Demon Hunters; director: Maggie Kang, co-directed with Chris Appelhans
- 2025 Love, Brooklyn; director: Rachael Abigail Holder
- 2025 Magic Farm; director: Amalia Ulman
- 2025 Magic Hour; director: Katie Aselton
- 2025 The Mastermind; director: Kelly Reichardt
- 2025 Materialists; director: Celine Song
- 2025 Nesting; director: Chloé Cinq-Mars
- 2025 O Horizon; director: Madeleine Sackler
- 2025 Oh, Hi!; director: Sophie Brooks
- 2025 The Old Guard 2; director: Victoria Mahoney
- 2025 Peak Everything; director: Anne Émond
- 2025 Queens of the Dead; director: Tina Romero
- 2025 Red Sonja; director: M. J. Bassett
- 2025 The Scout; director: Paula González-Nasser
- 2025 Seven O'Clock Breakfast Club for the Brokenhearted; director: Lim Sun-ae
- 2025 She's the He; director: Siobhan McCarthy
- 2025 Slanted; director: Amy Wang
- 2025 Sound of Falling; director: Mascha Schilinski
- 2025 Summer's Camera; director: Divine Sung
- 2025 Teaching Practice: Idiot Girls and School Ghost 2; director: Kim Min-ha
- 2025 The Testament of Ann Lee; director: Mona Fastvold
- 2025 This Tempting Madness; director: Jennifer E. Montgomery
- 2025 Three Goodbyes; director: Isabel Coixet
- 2025 Tow; director: Stephanie Laing
- 2025 Undercard; director: Tamika Miller
- 2025 Unidentified; director: Haifaa al-Mansour
- 2025 The Virgin of the Quarry Lake; director: Laura Casabé
- 2025 We'll Find Happiness; director: Léa Pool
- 2025 Wish You Were Here; director: Julia Stiles
- 2025 Winter of the Crow; director: Kasia Adamik
- 2025 Yakushima's Illusion; director: Naomi Kawase
- 2025 You're Dating a Narcissist!; director: Ann Marie Allison

=== 2026 ===
- 2026 11; director: Clàudia Serra
- 2026 28 Years Later: The Bone Temple; director: Nia DaCosta
- 2026 7 Miles Out; director: Carol Morley
- 2026 Alive; director: Aina Clotet
- 2026 All My Friends Are Back in Brisbane; director: Louise Alston
- 2026 All Our Tomorrows; director: Yūki Yamato
- 2026 Another League; director: Marta Díaz de Lope Díaz
- 2026 Armageddon Road; director: Karen Lam
- 2026 Avatar Aang: The Last Airbender; director: Lauren Montgomery
- 2026 Azad Bharath; director: Roopa Iyer
- 2026 Ba's Book; director: Ashley Duong
- 2026 Bad Beast; director: Bàrbara Farré
- 2026 The Banquet; director: Gloria Ui Young Kim
- 2026 Best of the Best; director: Lena Khan
- 2026 The Blood Countess; director: Ulrike Ottinger
- 2026 The Bride!; director: Maggie Gyllenhaal
- 2026 Broad Trip; director: Crystal Lowe
- 2026 Broken Bird; director: Joanne Mitchell
- 2026 Boulevard; director: Sonia Méndez
- 2026 Camp; director: Avalon Fast
- 2026 Cat Cam; director: Sara Werner
- 2026 The Cat in the Hat; director: Erica Rivinoja
- 2026 Children Untold; director: Miwa Nishikawa
- 2026 Cowgirl; director: Cristina Fernández Pintado
- 2026 Daayra; director: Meghna Gulzar
- 2026 A Day in the Life of Jo: Chapter Phaedra; director: Jacqueline Lentzou
- 2026 Don't Say Good Luck; director: Julia Hart
- 2026 The Dreadful; director: Natasha Kermani
- 2026 DreamQuil; director: Alex Prager
- 2026 The End of It; director: Maria Martínez Bayona
- 2026 Extra Geography; director: Miriam Battye
- 2026 The Face of Horror; director: Anna Biller
- 2026 Far From the Trees; director: Meritxell Colell
- 2026 Finding Emily; director: Alicia MacDonald
- 2026 A Fire There; director Marlene Edoyan
- 2026 Flying Colors; director: Beatriz de Silva
- 2026 Forbidden Fruits; director: Meredith Alloway
- 2026 Frank & Louis; director: Petra Volpe
- 2026 The Gallerist; director: Cathy Yan
- 2026 Girls Like Girls; director: Hayley Kiyoko
- 2026 The Girl with the Leica; director: Alina Marazzi
- 2026 Guarding Stars; director: Katherine Center
- 2026 Heartland; director: Shana Feste
- 2026 Hexed; director: Fawn Veerasunthorn
- 2026 Hold onto Me; director: Myrsini Aristidou
- 2026 Holy Days; director: Nathalie Boltt
- 2026 Un Hombre por Semana; director: Ana de la Reguera
- 2026 How We Stand; director: Marie Clements
- 2026 I See Buildings Fall like Lightning; director: Clio Barnard
- 2026 I Won't Die for Love; director: Marta Matute
- 2026 The Idiot(s); director: Małgorzata Szumowska
- 2026 In the Heart of the South; director: Nyla Innuksuk
- 2026 Influenced; director: Rachel Israel
- 2026 The Invite; director: Olivia Wilde
- 2026 Is God Is; director: Aleshea Harris
- 2026 Josephine; director: Beth de Araújo
- 2026 Julián; director: Louise Bagnall
- 2026 Killer Whale; director: Jo-Anne Brechin
- 2026 Ladies First; director: Thea Sharrock
- 2026 Lady; director: Olive Nwosu
- 2026 The Last Kiss; director: Yoko Okumura
- 2026 The Last Temptation of Becky; director: Jenn Wexler
- 2026 Lifeline; director: Ilhan Abdullahi
- 2026 The Love Hypothesis: director: Claire Scanlon
- 2026 Love of Your Life; director: Rachel Morrison
- 2026 The Loved One; director: Irene Emma Villamor
- 2026 Lydia and the Mist Rider; director: Émilie Rosas and Nancy Florence Savard
- 2026 Mag Mag; director: Yuriyan Retriever
- 2026 Magical Secret Tour; director: Chihiro Amano
- 2026 Mary Magdalene; director: Gessica Généus
- 2026 Moses the Black; director: Yelena Popovic
- 2026 A Mosquito in the Ear; director: Nicola Rinciari
- 2026 The Musical; director: Giselle Bonilla
- 2026 My Amazing Grandma; director: Ana Vázquez
- 2026 My Wife Is a Ghost; director: María Ripoll
- 2026 Nightborn; director: Hanna Bergholm
- 2026 Nina Roza; director: Geneviève Dulude-De Celles
- 2026 Noseeums; director: Raven DeShay Carter
- 2026 No Good Men; director: Shahrbanoo Sadat
- 2026 Not a Hero; director: Rima Das
- 2026 On Fire; director: Estel Díaz
- 2026 The Open Window; director: Ana Graciani
- 2026 Our Share of Sand; director: Shalini Adnani
- 2026 Pauline; director: Anaïs Barbeau-Lavalette
- 2026 Pepita the Gunslinger; director: Lucía Puenzo
- 2026 Phera; director: Pritha Chakraborty
- 2026 Portrait of a Family; director: Lee Ji-won
- 2026 Practical Magic 2; director: Susanne Bier
- 2026 A Prayer for the Dying; director: Dara Van Dusen
- 2026 Pretty Lethal; director: Vicky Jewson
- 2026 Prima Facie; director: Susanna White
- 2026 Purgatory; director: Lindsay Lanzillotta
- 2026 Relationship Goals; director: Linda Mendoza
- 2026 Remarkably Bright Creatures; director: Olivia Newman
- 2026 Reminders of Him; director: Vanessa Caswill
- 2026 Rock Springs; director: Vera Miao
- 2026 Runner; director: Laura García Alonso
- 2026 Saccharine; director: Natalie Erika James
- 2026 Sacred Creatures; director: Frieda Luk
- 2026 A Safe Distance; director: Gloria Mercer
- 2026 Seahorse; director: Aisha Evelyna
- 2026 Sense and Sensibility; director: Georgia Oakley
- 2026 Sisters; director: Ione Hernández
- 2026 The Snake; director: Jenna MacMillan
- 2026 So Long Pluto; director: Sarianne Cormier
- 2026 Someone's Daughter; director: Wiebke von Carolsfeld
- 2026 Soulm8te; director: Kate Dolan
- 2026 Starstruck; director: Michelle Danner
- 2026 Steps; director: Alyce Tzue
- 2026 Still Night, Burning House; director: Carol Nguyen
- 2026 Stranger in Town; director: Melanie Oates
- 2026 A Sucker's Born Every Minute; director: Arantxa Echevarría
- 2026 Sugar Beach; director: Noely Mendoza
- 2026 Sundown; director: Rebekah McKendry
- 2026 System; director: Ashwiny Iyer Tiwari
- 2026 Take Me Home; director: Liz Sargent
- 2026 Teenage Sex and Death at Camp Miasma; director: Jane Schoenbrun
- 2026 Tenzing; director: Jennifer Peedom
- 2026 'Tis So Sweet; director: Tasha Smith
- 2026 To Die Is Not Always Good Business; director: Claudia Pinto
- 2026 Toxic; director: Geetu Mohandas
- 2026 Trinidad; director: Laura Alvea
- 2026 Two Cigarettes, Three Nights; director: Yukiko Mishima
- 2026 Two Mountains Weighing Down My Chest; director: Viv Li
- 2026 Virginia Woolf's Night and Day; director: Tina Gharavi
- 2026 Voicemails for Isabelle; director: Leah McKendrick
- 2026 Wardriver; director: Rebecca Thomas
- 2026 Whale Shark Jack; director: Miranda Edmonds
- 2026 Whatcha Want; director: Mina Shum
- 2026 White Blast; director: Hong Eui-jeong
- 2026 Wuthering Heights; director: Emerald Fennell
- 2026 You, Me & Tuscany; director: Kat Coiro
