= Diary for My Father and Mother =

Napló apámnak, anyámnak Diary for My Father and Mother
- Directed by: Márta Mészáros
- Written by: Márta Mészáros, Éva Pataki
- Starring: Zsuzsa Czinkóczi
- Cinematography: Nyika Jancsó
- Edited by: Éva Kármentő
- Release date: 21 June 1990
- Running time: 119 minutes
- Country: Hungary
- Languages: Hungarian, Russian

Diary for My Father and Mother (Hungarian: Napló apámnak, anyámnak) is a 1990 Hungarian film directed by Márta Mészáros. It is the third film of the autobiographical trilogy, preceded by Diary for My Children and Diary for My Lovers.

== Synopsis ==
The story follows Juli, a young film student, during the 1956 Hungarian uprising. Returning from her studies in Moscow, she sees her friends and family react differently. János, a married factory manager, supports the patriots and later assists fellow workers in staging a strike. Magda, a Secret police officer, is in hiding. Others express anger at being forced from their homes during the revolution. Some decide to emigrate, others stay...

A particularly surreal scene involves a New Year's Eve party in which the participants wear costumes. An intoxicated woman yells anti-government curses out of the window. Within a very short time police arrive and look suspiciously at the guests, who are all wearing ridiculous costumes.

The film contains documentary footage integrated with the story.

== Cast ==
- Zsuzsa Czinkóczi as Juli
- Jan Nowicki as János
- Tamás Végvári as János (voice)
- Ildikó Bánsági as Ildi
- Mari Törőcsik as Vera
- Anna Polony as Magda
- Teri Földi as Magda (voice)
- Adél Kováts as Natasa
- Erzsébet Kútvölgyi as Erzsi
- Irina Kouberskaya as Anna Pavlova
- Erika Szegedi as Anna Pavlova (voice)
