= Adventure (2011 film) =

2011 film

- Film poster
- Directed by: József Sipos
- Written by: József Sipos; Sándor Márai; Francisco Gózon
- Produced by: József Sipos; Krisztina Détár
- Starring: Gerd Böckmann
- Cinematography: Francisco Gózon
- Edited by: Gabriella Koncz
- Music by: Gábor Berkes
- Distributed by: PCN Film Produkció
- Release date: 20 October 2011
- Running time: 90 minutes
- Country: Hungary
- Language: Hungarian

Adventure (Hungarian: Kaland) is a 2011 Hungarian drama film directed by József Sipos.

== Cast ==
- Gerd Böckmann as Prof. Kádár
- Erika Marozsán as Anna Kádár
- Sándor Csányi as Zoltán
- Károly Eperjes as Dr. Szekeres
- Mari Törőcsik as Nono
- Eszter Nagy-Kálózy as Countess Olga
- Marianna Moór as Nurse
- Tibor Szilágyi as Minister
- Teri Tordai as Minister's wife
- Armand Kautzky as Hotel manager
- Judit Pogány as Sick woman
