= Halina Mlynkova =

Polish singer (born 1977)

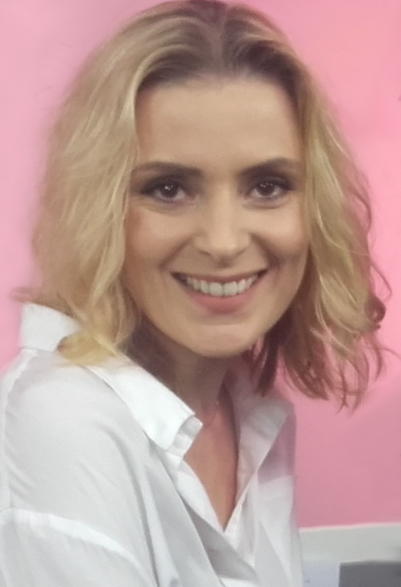
- Mlynkova in 2016
- Born: 22 June 1977 (age 49); Návsí, Czechoslovakia
- Occupation: Singer
- Spouses: Łukasz Nowicki (m. 2003; div. 2012); Lešek Wronka (m. 2015; div. 2020)
- Children: 1 (son)
- Musical career
- Origin: Kraków, Poland
- Genres: Pop, folk, rock
- Years active: 1998–present
- Labels: Mystic Production, Universal Music Poland
- Website: www.halinamlynkova.pl

Halina Mlynkova (born 22 June 1977) is a Polish-Czech singer. From 1998 to 2003, she was the vocalist of a popular Polish folk-rock group Brathanki.

== Biography ==
Mlynkova was born on 22 June 1977 in Návsí, Czechoslovakia to a Polish family, as a daughter of Władysław and Anna Młynek. She graduated from Medical High School in Cieszyn and Jagiellonian University in Kraków.

She was married to Polish actor Łukasz Nowicki for nine years. They divorced on 25 May 2012. Łukasz and Halina have a son Piotr. From February 2015 to August 2020 was married to the Czech music producer Lešek Wronka. Mlynkova is a Lutheran.

== Discography ==
=== Studio albums ===
Title	Album details	Peak chart positions
Title	Album details	POL
Etnoteka	Released: November 7, 2011; Label: Mystic Production; Formats: CD, digital download	48
Po drugiej stronie lustra	Released: October 29, 2013; Label: Universal Music Poland; Formats: CD, digital download	—
"—" denotes a recording that did not chart or was not released in that territory.

=== Music videos ===
Title	Year	Directed	Album
"Kobieta z moich snów"	2011	Jacek Kościuszko	Etnoteka
"Dziwogóra"	2012	Mateusz Winkiel	Etnoteka
"Podejrzani zakochani" with Krzysztof Kiljański	2012	—	non-album single
"Aż do dna"	2013	—	Po drugiej stronie lustra
"Ostatni raz"	2014	Marian Martaus	Po drugiej stronie lustra
"Zabiorę Cię"	2015	—	non-album single
