= Nobody's Daughter (film) =

- Hungarian: Árvácska
- Directed by: László Ranódy; Gyula Mészáros
- Written by: Judit Elek
- Release date: 4 March 1976
- Running time: 85 minutes
- Country: Hungary
- Language: Hungarian

Nobody's Daughter (Hungarian: Árvácska) is a Hungarian film released 4 March 1976. Based on a book by Zsigmond Móricz, the film tells the story of Csöre, an orphan girl living among the peasantry of Hungary in the 1930s. It stars Zsuzsa Czinkóczi, then age seven, as main character Csöre, also known as Árvácska. Árvácska means literally "little orphan" and it's also the Hungarian name of the violet flower.

The film depicts the suffering of an orphaned girl with the greatest possible naturalism. It is shocking, depressing, and—like the novel itself—heartbreaking. The cruelty and torture that Csora endured are felt by the viewer with almost equal pain. There have been few works in European cinema that are so frank and, moreover, so firmly grounded in reality since Moritz’s novel about a girl named “Chibe,” whom he prevented from committing suicide on the Szabadság Bridge.[1]

The film continues to shock and even depress audiences. Many question the age rating for children under 12, as it contains excessive violence and Csora is shown naked for almost the entire film.[2] According to some sources, the film was seen by a million people in the year of its release.[3]

The film was released in the United States under the title Nobody's Daughter.

== Plot ==
Somewhere in a Hungarian village lives a little girl: Csöre (Zsuzsa Csinkóczi). Her official name is Allami Arvaska, and she's an orphan. The family that adopted her did so only so she could work for them. To prevent her from running away, they take away all her clothes, and she tends the cow entrusted to her by Boris (the family's father), completely naked. Then the cow wanders into the vineyard of Istvan Kadarcs, "Uncle Rudy." He catches the girl and rapes her. The Dudás family learns of this that same evening. The next day, Csöre appears, but for his diligence, he only receives a reprimand from "My Dear Mother" (Anna Nagy). Later, Csöre steals a melon, from whose rind she makes a hat. She trades it for a shirt belonging to her from one of her stepsisters. That evening, at dinner, the theft of the melon is discussed: "My Dear Father" (Šandor Horváth) presses a red-hot coal into Csöre's hand as punishment. Pleased that she has clothes, Csöre goes to school with Boris the next day, and then "out into the world."

Csöre drove the cow into a neighboring town and wandered into the yard of a house. There, she was cared for and given a place to stay for the night. The next day, Csöre waits for new adoptive parents at the local orphanage. Young people come to her, searching for their lost child. They care for Csöre for a long time, but eventually abandon her. Then Žofka (Ila Schütz), the Szeneseks' maid, attacks Csöre and takes her away.

Here, she's treated no better from the start: Žabamari (Marianne Moor) immediately sends her to the stables of the "Old God" (József Bihari). Csöre is also disgusted by her and runs away, but the old man stops her and gently scolds her, urging her to behave better. The next day, the woman washes Csöre's hair with lye, which causes the girl to suffer. Afterwards, she sends Csöre to herd turkeys. There, Žabamari drops her slippers while herding the cattle. She loses one of the slippers, for which Žabamari spanks her. The next day, Csöre goes to the cemetery, and then to the church of the "Old God." The old man tells her many interesting things. He also explains that he once had a fine weaving workshop, but then lost everything after Žabamari's family squandered much of his fortune, and now they only keep him for the land he still owns.

Žabamarí, seeing that Csöre and the "Old God" have become good friends and that the latter has spoken with the gendarmes several times, mixes poison into the old man's milk, saying, "If he drinks this, he'll never complain again." The next day, the old man dies and is buried. The gendarmes also appear at the gate, looking for a document related to the land left by the late János Csömor, or "Old God." The woman feigns ignorance. When the gendarmes leave, Csöre joins them in conversation. Naturally, Žabamarí immediately, almost paranoidly, suspects the girl, so Csöre won't reveal her deed: she constantly watches Csöre, burns the few belongings the old man left behind, and finally gives the girl a mug of poisoned milk. But then Csöre tries to give Szenneša's child something to drink (unaware that the mug she was holding contained poisoned milk), which enrages Žabamari, who attacks the girl. Only her husband, József Szenneš, and her maid, Žofka (Adam Širtes), can stop her.

Christmas is approaching. The Szennies family slaughters a pig. Žabamari, now almost schizophrenic, still casts sideways glances at Csöre. Relatives arrive for the celebration. Csöre watches from the doorway as the family eats with relish, but she doesn't get to taste a single morsel from the set table. She approaches József Szennies, sitting at the head of the table, calling him "dear father," but he mocks her. Broken-hearted, Csöre steals some meat from the table, after which she is thrown out of the warm house. In the stable, she lights a homemade spruce branch and begins to pray.

However, the flames quickly spread through the barn, engulfing the entire Szenies farm.

== Deviations from the novel ==
Although the film adaptation faithfully follows the novel, some details are omitted: for example, the opening omits the circumstances of Csore's arrival at the Dudas family, cutting directly to the scene where Pista's neighbor, Kadarks, rapes the girl. Later, Mr. Dudas shoots Kadarks, and there's no mention of "His Majesty" coming to the family from his office to interrogate them because Csore isn't going to school. Finally, Mrs. Dudas returns the girl to the orphanage. The film depicts Csore's escape as an independent effort, though this is not the case in the novel. The Värö family (Csore's third adoptive parents) doesn't appear in the film at all. This is especially striking because the film ends with the Szenni house catching fire after the broken girl has celebrated Christmas alone. From a plot point of view, two more things were left out: Dudás eventually hanged himself, and Toad Marie Senneshne was sentenced to death because the authorities discovered that she had poisoned the "Old God", i.e. János Csomor.

== Cast ==
- Zsuzsa Czinkóczi as Csöre
- Anna Nagy as Kedvesanyám, Csöre's first stepmother
- Sándor Horváth as Kedvesapám, Csöre's first stepfather
- Marianna Moór as Zsabamári, Csöre's second stepmother
- Ila Schütz as Zsofka
- Ádám Szirtes as Szennyes József
- Flóra Kádár as wife
- József Madaras as Kadaros István
- Piroska Molnár as Anna
- László Szacsvay as Fáradtarcú
