= Beautiful Blue Eyes =

- Film poster
- Directed by: Joshua Newton
- Written by: Joshua Newton
- Produced by: Joshua Newton; Kevin Farr
- Starring: Roy Scheider; Scott Cohen; Alexander Newton; Sarah Bolger; Helmut Berger; Calita Rainford; Anna Polony
- Cinematography: Adrian Cranage, James Simon
- Edited by: Joshua Newton
- Music by: Roger Bellon; Justin Caine Burnett; Joshua Field
- Release date: December 2009 (Los Angeles)
- Running time: 94 minutes
- Country: United Kingdom
- Language: English

Beautiful Blue Eyes (originally entitled Iron Cross) is a 2009 English thriller film written and directed by Joshua Newton. It stars Roy Scheider in his final role as a retired police detective who believes he has found the Nazi officer who slaughtered his family in World War II. Scott Cohen, Alexander Newton, Calita Rainford, Sarah Bolger, Anna Polony, and Helmut Berger appear in supporting roles.

Shot in 2007, the film premiered as Iron Cross at the 26th Boston Film Festival in 2010 and had a limited theatrical release the following year. It was not shown publicly again until 2022 when the film was retitled Beautiful Blue Eyes and given a new limited release to coincide with a re-release of Scheider's film Jaws. The film is currently exclusively available through the digital platform MovieKey.

== Plot ==
Joseph is a retired NYPD cop and Holocaust survivor. He travels to Nuremberg to visit his son Ronnie years after turning his back on him for rejecting a promising career in the NYPD and marrying a local artist, Anna. No sooner does Joseph attempt to heal the rift with Ronnie than he swears that an elderly man living in Ronnie's building, under the false name of Shrager, is the Nazi SS Commander who slaughtered his entire family during World War II. With little hope of seeing him stand trial, Joseph talks Ronnie into exacting justice – and vengeance – and together they set out to kill him.

Flashbacks reveal the teenage love of Young Joseph for a heroic Polish girl, Kashka, and his narrow escape from the massacre, leading to the film's climax.

== Cast ==
- Roy Scheider as Joseph
  - Alexander Newton as Young Joseph
- Scott Cohen as Ronnie
- Calita Rainford as Anna
- Sarah Bolger as Kashka
- Anna Polony as Frau Ganz
- Helmut Berger as Shrager / Vogler
  - Mateusz Janicki as Young Vogler

== Production ==
Newton developed the script from a concept involving his father, Bruno Newton. Joshua asked himself what his father would do in the event that he discovered the man who murdered his family during the Holocaust. The character of Joseph, played by Roy Scheider, is loosely based on Bruno Newton. Alexander Newton, son of Joshua and grandson of Bruno, played the young Joseph during World War II. Bruno Newton died during filming from the same disease that took Roy Scheider's life nine months later, multiple myeloma.

As Scheider died before production was finished, some of his scenes were completed utilizing CGI techniques.

== Accolades ==
The film had a week-long qualifying run in Los Angeles for awards consideration. It later aired at the 26th Boston Film Festival in September 2010, where director Joshua Newton won the Visionary Filmmaker Award. His son, Alexander, won the festival's prize for Best Young Actor for his portrayal of the young Joseph.

On 15 November 2010, the film received the Remembrance Award at the Museum of Tolerance International Film Festival in Los Angeles. Rabbi Marvin Hier, Founder and Dean of the Museum of Tolerance and the Simon Wiesenthal Center, called the picture "The most important film since Schindler's List".

Box Office Pro magazine's Pete Hammond gave the film a favourable review, writing "What he's achieved here is a beautifully crafted movie likely to have audiences talking long afterward, especially considering the twist ending that left the audience I previewed the film with buzzing."

== Lawsuits ==
=== Oscar campaign lawsuit ===
In the summer of 2009, Variety editor Tim Grey listed Iron Cross, among about 50 other films, as a potential Academy Awards nominee. The magazine's sales staff, apparently acting independent of the editorial staff, contacted Joshua Newton that same day, signing him to a $400,000 ($600,000 today) Oscar ad campaign.

The November 2009 Oscar ad campaign was undercut after the film had a week-long, unadvertised, Oscar qualifying run in Los Angeles in December 2009. A review from that run, published by Variety's editorial staff, was quite negative, opening with: "Iron Cross will be remembered as Roy Scheider's swan song and little else". Following an apology by the magazine's managing director, the editor removed the review from the magazine's website, with no official explanation.

Calibra LLC, the production company behind the film, sued Variety, stating that the review breached the advertising agreement to promote the picture for Oscar consideration. On 12 May 2010 a California Superior Court judge granted Variety's anti-SLAPP motion and dismissed Calibra's case as Variety's review was protected under the First Amendment. Calibra subsequently appealed on the grounds that Variety had impliedly waived the magazine's free speech rights when it signed the promotions contract. The California Court of Appeal held that Variety's rights under the First Amendment could only be waived expressly, not as an implied term of the agreement, and as such ruled in favor of Variety. The original negative review from Variety has been re-posted to their website.

=== Facebook advertising lawsuit ===
Ahead of the film's 2022 release, Joshua Newton filed a lawsuit against Facebook for banning the filmmakers from promoting or advertising the film. Facebook stated the film's title violated its policy against content that "includes direct or indirect assertions or implications about a person's race", among other personal attributes. A California federal court dismissed the lawsuit in September 2023.
