= Marianna Moór =

Hungarian actress (born 1943)

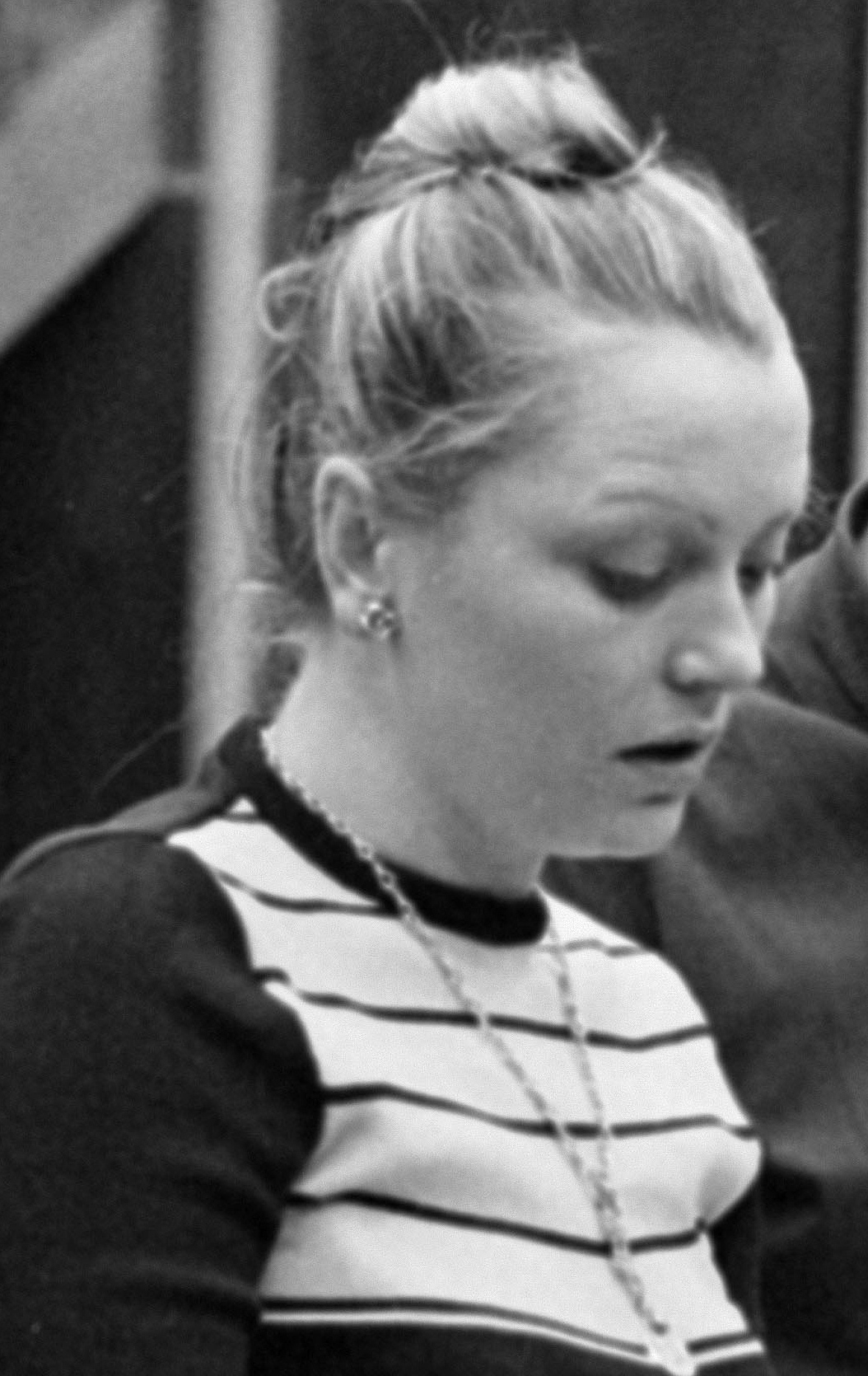
- Moór in 1973
- Born: 5 February 1943 (age 83); Budapest, Hungary
- Occupation: Actress

Marianna Moór (born 5 February 1943) is a Hungarian actress.

Her first husband was Sándor Sára. Her second marriage was to a veterinarian named Aladár.

== Selected filmography ==
- Sodrásban (1964)
- Voyage with Jacob (1972)
- The Pendragon Legend (1974)
- The Fifth Seal (1976)
- Nobody's Daughter (1976)
- The Stud Farm (1978)
- The Vulture (1982)
- The Unburied Man (2004)
- Adventure (2011)
