= Łukasz Nowicki =

Polish actor, journalist and television presenter (born 1973)

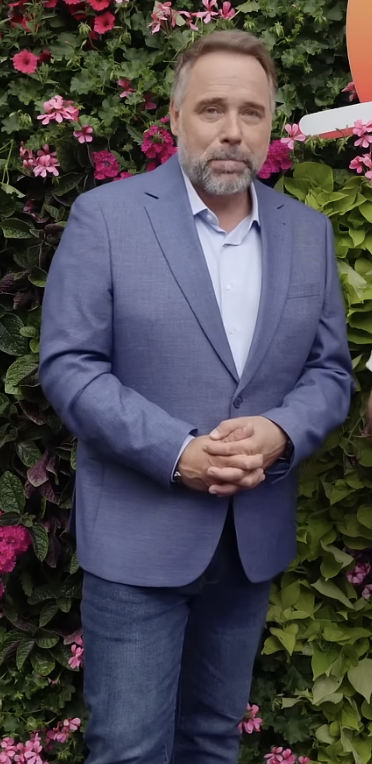
- Nowicki in 2025
- Born: 6 July 1973 (age 52); Kraków, Poland
- Education: AST National Academy of Theatre Arts in Kraków
- Occupations: Theatre and film actor; television presenter; game show host; journalist
- Years active: 1990–present
- Employer(s): Telewizja Polska; TVP2
- Television: Postaw na million Pytanie na śniadanie
- Spouses: Halina Mlynkova (m. 2003; div. 2012) Olga Paszkowska (m. 2016)
- Children: 2
- Parents: Jan Nowicki (father); Barbara Sobotta-Janiszewska (mother)
- Relatives: Sajana Nowicka (half-sister)

Łukasz Nowicki (born 6 July 1973 in Kraków) is a Polish stage and film actor, journalist, and television presenter, associated with Telewizja Polska since 2010. From 2010–Q2 2023, host of Pytanie na śniadanie (TVP2), a breakfast television. Since 2011, he has been the host of the game show Postaw na milion. Nowicki has voice dubbed in well-known movies such as Avengers, Spirited Away and Toy Story 3.

== Early life ==
Łukasz Nowicki was born in 1973 in Kraków, the son of actor Jan Nowicki and his wife, Barbara Sobotta, a European athletics champion. At the beginning of their relationship, they did not take it seriously. After the birth of Łukasz, Jan's attitude towards the family changed; he became increasingly disengaged and was often absent, leaving Łukasz and his mother alone. After a few years, the couple separated. Łukasz's mother subsequently raised him on her own. According to Łukasz Nowicki's testimony, he was a victim of physical abuse by his father, stating that he remembers him primarily for "the beatings." From a young age, he was immersed in an environment filled with theatre and art, which influenced his decision to pursue a career in the arts.

Łukasz Nowicki has a half-sister on his father's side named Sajana Nowicka, born in 1973.

In high school, he was different from the rest of the kids as he had a good plans for the future, he wanted to become an actor. He had the interest to attend many theaters as a kid that lead to these interests.

After finishing high school, he was admitted to the Ludwik Solski State Theatre School in Kraków where he got in without any problem, graduating in 1998. He possessed a strong drive and was eager to maximize his playing time. While still a student, he made his on-screen debut with a minor role in the film The Seventh Room. That same year, he appeared alongside his father and Artur Żmijewski in the movie Rainy Soldier.

Łukasz received his diploma two years later, and his graduation performance was Three Sisters, based on Anton Chekhov’s play.

== Personal life ==
In August 2003, Nowicki married Polish-Czech singer Halina Mlynkova in Trans-Olza. Łukasz converted from Catholicism to Evangelicalism in order to marry Halina. They have one son together. The couple divorced after 9 years of marriage.

Nowicki's second marriage was to Olga Paszkowska, a psychotherapist, yoga instructor, and actor. The couple married in 2016, with the ceremony taking place in Bali, Indonesia. They have one daughter, Józefina Nowicka, born in 2018.

As of October 2023, Łukasz Nowicki and his family live in a big and luxurious flat in Warsaw. The family also owns an apartment in Albania.

== Filmography ==
=== Cast ===
Year	Title	Role	Notes
1990	Naplo Apamnak, Anyamnak	–	
1994	Zabawa w koty	Waiter	
1995	La settima stanza	Student	Uncredited.
1996	Deszczowy żołnierz	Jan Szymański as a young man	
1997	Nowe szaty cesarza	Balbin	
1997	Matka Courage i jej dzieci	Swiss woman	
1998	Edith i Marlene	Theo	
1999	Prawo ojca	Zdzisław Kaczor "Stick"	
2000	Córy szczęścia	Robert’s bodyguard	
2000	Skarb sekretarza	Uwe Muller	
2000	Przeprowadzki	Bogdan Szczygieł, son of Stanisław	Ep: 6-10.
2000	Prymas. Trzy lata z tysiąca	–	
2000	Kisvilma. Az utolso naplo	Laszlo Kovacs, Vilma’s father	
2001	Enduro Bojz	Helicopter pilot; voice only	
2001	Złotopolscy	Borys Stojan, Kowalski's masseur	Ep. 375.
2001	Złotopolscy	Borys Stojan, Kowalski's driver and masseur	Ep: 354, 355, 356, 358, 359, 362, 363, 372, 376.
2001	Przeprowadzki	Bogdan Szczygieł, son of Stanisław	Ep: 6–10.
2002	Na dobre i na złe	Adaś's father	Ep. 68.
2002– 2010	Jest sprawa...	Uwe Muller	
2003	Samo życie	Szymon Sieniawski "Ludo", employee of the District Prosecutor’s Office, friend of Teresa Jankowska	
2003	Pogoda na jutro	Voice of the host of the "Claudia" show	
2003	Męskie - żeńskie	Andrzej, owner of the parrot "Jadzia"	Christmas episode
2003 - 2025	Na Wspólnej	Zygmunt Kraszewski, Renata's husband	Ep: 744–745, 747, 752.
2004	A temetetlen halott	Journalist	
2005	Magda M.	Sebastian’s boss	Ep. 15.
2005	1409. Afera na zamku Bartenstein	Law enforcement officer	
2006	Magda M.	Grzegorz Zabraniecki	Ep: 18, 20–22, 25, 29, 30.
2007	Kochaj mnie, kochaj!	Dr. Bartek Milewski	
2007	Tajemnica twierdzy szyfrów	Ivan Biriukov, Soviet paratrooper commander	
2007	Hela w opałach	Benek Kostka, Kacper’s coach	Ep. 41.
2008	Hela w opałach	Benek Kostka, Kacper’s coach	Ep: 43, 45, 46.
2008	39 i pół	Ryszard Kądziołka	Ep: 2, 11, 12.
2009	Niania	Security guard	Ep. 122.
2009	Naznaczony	Journalist Grypiński "Grippen"	Ep: 3-4.
2009	Grzeszni i bogaci	Big Bob	Ep. 2.
2010	Nowa	Piotr Cieślik, Marta’s husband	Ep. 4.
2010	Fenomen	Screenwriter Stanisław	
2010–2011	Prosto w serce	Lawyer Makowski	Ep: 120, 127, 137, 142, 144, 146–147, 151–154.
2011	Rodzinka.pl	Piotrek’s dad	Ep. 1.
2011	Hotel 52	Lawyer Łukasz Hartman	Ep. 29.
2012	Prawo Agaty	Maciek	Ep: 9-11, 13-22.
2012	Ojciec Mateusz	Damian Tarkowski, Bilska’s husband	Ep. 99.
2012	Barwy Szczęścia	Sławomir Wolski	Ep: 716, 718-719, 722-723, 731, 736, 745, 749, 762-763, 765, 771, 780, 782, 805, 808, 829-830, 832.
2012– 2014	Piąty Stadion	Playing himself	Ep. 1.
2013	Ojciec Mateusz	–	Ep. 121.
2013	Barwy Szczęścia	Sławomir Wolski	Ep: 870, 872, 875, 878.
2013–2014	Wrzuć na luuuz	Lucjan, Paweł’s friend	Ep: 3–4, 7, 10.
2014	Na dobre i na złe	Journalist	Ep. 548.
2014	Barwy Szczęścia	Lawyer Sławomir Wolski, Kasia’s friend	Ep: 1064, 1066, 1070.
2015	Zbrodnia. Sezon drugi	Mariusz Walicki	
2015	Historia kobiety	Marta’s boss	
2016	Po prostu przyjaźń	Jacek Nowak, Alina’s husband	
2016	Ojciec Mateusz	Manager Karol	Ep. 200.
2017	Kurs	Man	
2019	Serce do walki	Marek Kucharczyk, father of Piotr and Andrzej	
2019– 2021	Domowe rozgrywki	Playing himself	Ep: 1–5.
2021	Otwórz oczy	Voice of the "black cube"	Ep: 1–5.

=== Polish dubbing ===
Year	Title	Role
1963	The Sword in the Stone	Pelinore
1981	The Looney, Looney, Looney Bugs Bunny Movie	
1992	Batman: The Animated Series	
1995	Timon and Pumbaa	Anteater
1995	Tenko and the Guardians of the Magic	
1996	Walter Melon	
1997	Leisure Suit Larry 7: Love for Sail	Willy
1998	Silver Surfer	Silver Surfer
1998	The New Addams Family	Cramp
1999	Wakko's Wish	Tom Bodett
1999	Courage the Cowardly Dog	Computer
1999	Toy Story 2	Buzz Astral
1999	The Iron Giant	Kent Mansley
2000	Might and Magic VIII: Day of the Destroyer	
2000	Pokémon: Kesshō Tō no Teiō	Doctor Spencer Hale / Entei
2001	Black & White	Bad alter ego
2001	Gothic	Snaf / Scatty / Herek / Garp / Harlok / Balor / Senyan
2001	Sen to Chihiro no Kamikakushi	Akio Ogino, father Chihiro
2002	Czarne orły	
2002	Jak powstawało "Quo Vadis"	
2002	Kadry z historii "Kadru" 1956 - 2001	
2002	Muminki: W Dolinie Muminków	Snufkin
2003	Polish Nobel Prize Winners	
2003	Tomorrow's Weather	Presenter of the "Claudia" program
2004	Teczki	
2005	Still alive. Film o Krzysztofie Kieślowskim	
2006	Cars	
2006	Ale sie kręci	
2006	Gothic 3	
2007	TMNT	
2009	Toy Story Mania!	Buzz Lightyear
2010	Toy Story 3	Buzz Lightyear
2010	Mass Effect 2	Commander Shepard
2010	Arcania	Snaf
2011	Toy Story: Small Fry	Buzz Lightyear
2011	Spooky Buddies	Dazzle
2011	Hawaiian Vacation	Buzz Lightyear
2011	MotorStorm Apocalypse	Big Dog
2012	The Avengers	Thor
2012	Partysaurus Rex	Buzz Lightyear
2012	Kinect Rush: A Disney-Pixar Adventure	Buzz Lightyear
2013	Toy Story of Terror	Buzz Lightyear
2014	The Seventh Dwarf	Chwatek
2014	Toy Story That Time Forgot	Buzz Lightyear
2014	Miłość potrzebna od zaraz	
2015	Le Petit Prince	Policeman
2015	Disney Infinity 3.0	Buzz Aldrin
2016	Ratchet and Clank	Captain Qwark
2018	The Predator	Traeger
2018	Ralph Breaks the Internet	Buzz Lightyear
2018	Gwent: The Witcher Card Game	Vilgefortz
2019	Toy Story 4	Buzz Lightyear
2020	Cyberpunk 2077	Skippy
2021	Open Your Eyes	"Czarna kostka" (Black cube)
2024	Myśmy już byli	

=== Voice-over ===
Year	Title
1999	Jerzy Grotowski. Próba portretu / Esquisse d’un portrait
2000	Kobiety, gazety i łzy
2002	Kadry z historii "Kadru" 1956–2001
2002	Czarne orły
2003	Polscy nobliści
2004	Teczki
2005	Still alive
2006	Ale się kręci!
2009	Wielka wojna na Wschodzie
2014	Miłość potrzebna od zaraz
2023	Anna Achmatowa. Requiem
2024	Myśmy już byli
