= Mari Szemes =

Hungarian actress (1932–1988)

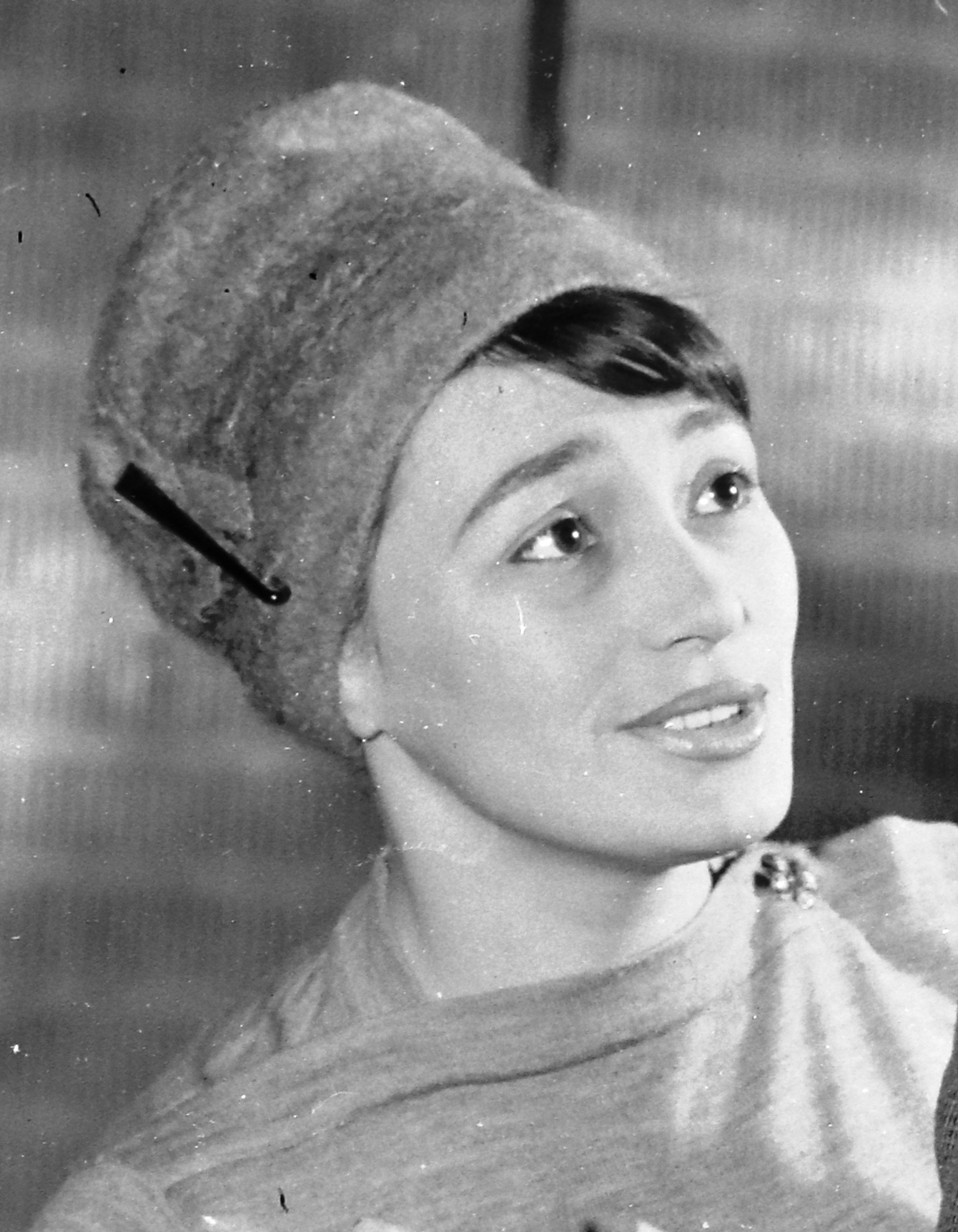
- Szemes in 1965
- Born: 7 May 1932; Šaštín, Czechoslovakia
- Died: 10 December 1988 (aged 56); Budapest, Hungary
- Occupation: Actress
- Years active: 1950–1988 (film and TV)

Mari Szemes (7 May 1932 – 10 December 1988) was a Hungarian actress. Of Hungarian ethnicity, she was born in Czechoslovakia. She acted at various venues through Hungary, including the National Theatre in Budapest. She was awarded with the Kossuth Prize for her stage acting. From 1950 onwards she also appeared regularly in film and television productions.

== Selected filmography ==
- Honesty and Glory (1951)
- Adventure in Gerolstein (1957)
- Don Juan's Last Adventure (1958)
- The Bells Have Gone to Rome (1959)
- The Man Who Doesn't Exist (1964)
- Car Crazy (1965)
- Hideg Napok (1966)
- The Healing Water (1967)
- Walls (1968)
- Son of the White Mare (1981)
- Diary for My Children (1984)
- Diary for My Lovers (1987)

== Bibliography ==
- Nemeskürty, István. Film in Ungarn. Henschelverlag, 1981. p. 158.
- Petrie, Graham. History Must Answer to Man: The Contemporary Hungarian Cinema. Corvina Kiadó, 1981. Petrie p. 262.
