= The Two of Them (film) =

- Directed by: Márta Mészáros
- Written by: Ildikó Kórody; József Balázs; Géza Bereményi; Márta Mészáros
- Starring: Marina Vlady; Lili Monori
- Cinematography: János Kende
- Edited by: Éva Kármentõ
- Music by: György Kovács
- Release date: 1977
- Running time: 100 minutes
- Countries: Hungary; France
- Language: Hungarian

The Two of Them (Hungarian: Ők ketten) is a 1977 Hungarian drama film, directed by Márta Mészáros. Marina Vlady and Lili Monori starred in the lead roles. The film features Russian actor-poet-singer Vladimir Vysotsky, real-life husband of Marina Vlady, in a minor role. This is the only film in which the two appear together on the screen.

== Plot summary ==
A young woman, married to a volatile alcoholic, becomes friends with an older woman who tries to protect her and her daughter.

== Cast ==
- Marina Vlady as Mária
- Lili Monori as Juli
- Jan Nowicki as János, Juli's husband
- Miklós Tolnay as Feri, Mária's husband
- Zsuzsa Czinkóczi as Zsuzsi, Juli's daughter
- Vladimir Vysotsky as cameo
- Judit Meszléry as Berekné
- Éva Szabó as Mária (voice)
- András Szigeti as Bodnár János (voice)
