= Foetus (film) =

1994 film by Márta Mészáros

- Directed by: Márta Mészáros
- Written by: Éva Pataki; Márta Mészáros
- Produced by: Ferenc Kardos
- Starring: Adél Kováts
- Cinematography: Nyika Jancsó
- Edited by: Éva Kármentő
- Release date: 10 November 1994
- Running time: 102 minutes
- Country: Hungary
- Language: Hungarian

Foetus (Hungarian: A magzat) is a 1994 Hungarian drama film directed by Márta Mészáros. It was entered into the 44th Berlin International Film Festival.

== Cast ==
- Adél Kováts as Anna
- Aliona Antonova as Teréz
- Jan Nowicki as Péter
- Barbara Hegyi as Judit
- László Bolyki as Anna férje
- Hanka Biazejczak
- Enikő Börcsök
- Attila Csáky
- Zsuzsa Czinkóczi
- Zoltán Farkas
- Pongrác Gonda
