= Márta Mészáros =

Hungarian screenwriter and film director (born 1931)

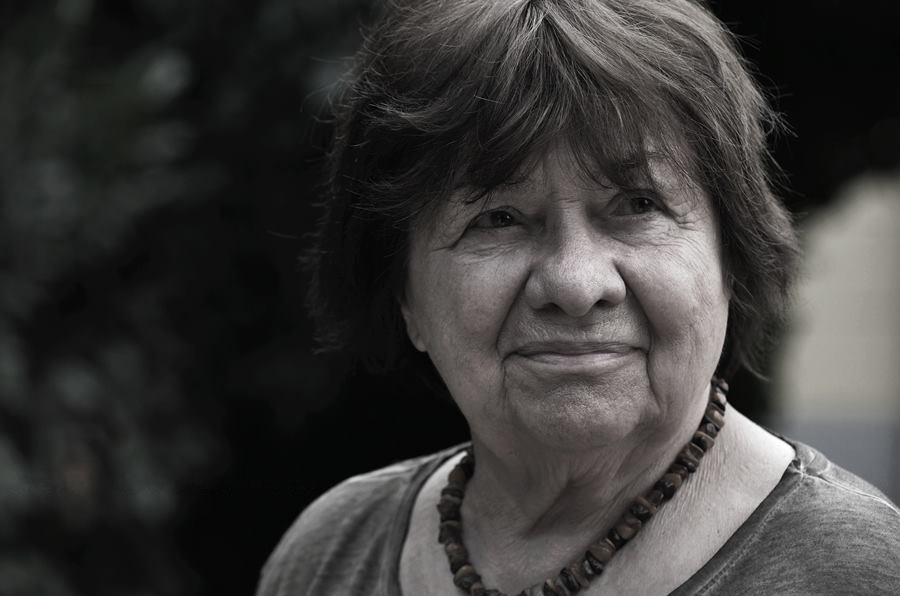
- Born: 19 September 1931 (age 95); Budapest, Hungary
- Occupations: Film director; screenwriter
- Years active: 1954–present
- Spouse(s): László Karda (1957–1959) (divorced); Miklós Jancsó (1960–1973) (divorced) (3 children); Jan Nowicki (?-2008) (divorced)

Márta Mészáros (born 19 September 1931) is a Hungarian screenwriter and film director. She was born in Kispest the 19th district of Budapest.The daughter of László Mészáros, a sculptor, Mészáros began her career working in documentary film, having made 25 documentary shorts over the span of ten years. Her full-length directorial debut, Eltávozott nap/The Girl (1968), was the first Hungarian film to have been directed by a woman, and won the Special Prize of the Jury at the Valladolid International Film Festival.

Mészáros' work often combines autobiographical details with documentary footage. Prominent themes include characters' denials of their pasts, the consequences of dishonesty, and the problematics of gender. Her films often feature heroines from fragmented families, such as young girls seeking their missing parents (The Girl) or middle-aged women looking to adopt children (Adoption).

Although Mészáros has made over fifteen feature films, she is arguably best known for Diary for My Children (1984), which won the Grand Prix at the Cannes Film Festival. It was the first entry in a trilogy of autobiographical films which also includes Diary for My Lovers (1987) and Diary for My Mother and Father (1990).

Throughout her career, Mészáros has won the Golden Bear and the Silver Bear awards at the Berlinale; the Golden Medal at the Chicago International Film Festival; the Silver Shell at the San Sebastian International Film Festival; and the FIPRESCI Prize at the Cannes Film Festival. In 1991 she was a member of the jury at the 17th Moscow International Film Festival.

== Early life and education ==
Born in Budapest, Mészáros spent eleven years of her childhood in the Soviet Union, where her parents had emigrated as communist artists in 1936. While there, Mészáros's father, László Mészáros, was arrested and killed in 1938 under the Stalinist regime and her mother died giving birth. Orphaned, Mészáros was raised by her foster mother in the USSR where she attended school. After returning to Hungary in 1946, Mészáros went back to Moscow to study at VGIK, returning again to Hungary only after her graduation in 1956.

== Career ==
Mészáros began working at the Budapest Newsreel Studio in 1954 where she made four short films, and then for the Alexandru Sahia documentary studio in Bucharest, Romania, from 1957–1959. She then returned to Budapest in 1958 to make science popularization shorts, and documentary shorts, where she worked until 1968. Mészáros joined the Mafilm Group 4 in the mid-1960s, and directed her first feature in 1968. At this time, Mészáros was the first woman director in Hungary to make a feature film. In the 1980s Mészáros made her semi-autobiographical "Diary films" that had a major impact on "Hungarian cinema" because of her conscious depiction of the government and individual past experiences. She challenged the censorship in Hungary and ascertained herself as an integral voice in the country's cinema. Since Mészáros first feature in 1968 she has made over fifty films, won numerous awards, and has been a judge on various film panels; she also continues to make films to this day.

== Legacy ==
Mészáros' films are in many ways reflective of her experiences growing up and deal with issues relevant to her life. Having lost both of her parents early in life, and having spent much of her youth living in a post-Stalinist Hungary, Mészáros' life was rife with tragedy and oppression, and her films are often reflective of this. Additionally, because Mészáros spent many of her first years as a filmmaker working in documentary films, many of her feature films also contain much documentary footage. In most of Mészáros' features, the films are open-ended, lack a conventional plot, and dialogue is sparse.

In terms of content, Mészáros' films explore the wide and often tragic gaps between ideals and realities, and between parents and their children. Mészáros' films deal with realities usually ignored in Eastern European cinema: the subordination of women, conflicts of urban and rural cultures, antagonism between the bureaucracy and its employees, alcoholism, the generation gap, dissolution of traditional family structures, and the plight of state-reared children.

Mészáros is one of few female filmmakers who consistently makes films that are both critically and commercially successful for an international audience. Her eight feature films, made from 1968 to 1979, are concerned with the social oppression, economic constraints, and emotional challenges faced by Hungarian women. In her own words, Mészáros explains: "I tell banal, commonplace stories, and then in them the leads are women—I portray things from a woman's angle."

== Personal life ==
Mészáros was first married to László Karda (a filmmaker), in 1957, but they divorced in 1959, and in 1960 she married Miklós Jancsó, a Hungarian film director and screenwriter whom she met during her time with the Mafilm Group 4. They raised his two sons and her son from previous marriages together. Although they later divorced in 1973, their two sons, Nyika Jancsó and Miklós Jancsó Jr., have each separately worked as director of photography on many of her films. She later married the Polish actor Jan Nowicki, but they divorced in 2008. Nowicki starred in many of her films, including the principal role in The Unburied Dead. His son from an earlier relationship, Łukasz Nowicki, starred in Mészáros' film, Kisvilma. Mészáros also has a daughter, Kasia Jancsó, from her second marriage.

== Filmography ==
Director (65 titles)

=== Feature films ===
Year	Title	Director	Screenwriter
1968	The Girl	Yes	Yes
1969	Holdudvar/Garden Party	Yes	Yes
1970	Szép lányok, ne sírjatok!	Yes	No
1973	Szabad lélegzet/Riddance	Yes	Yes
1973	Szeptember végén (TV Movie)	Yes	No
1975	Adoption	Yes	Yes
1976	Kilenc hónap/Nine Months	Yes	Yes
1977	The Two of Them	Yes	Yes
1978	Olyan mint otthon/Just Like Home	Yes	Yes
1979	Útközben/On the Move	Yes	Yes
1980	The Heiresses	Yes	Yes
1981	Anna	Yes	Yes
1983	Délibábok országa	Yes	No
1984	Diary for My Children	Yes	Yes
1987	Diary for My Lovers	Yes	Yes
1989	Bye bye chaperon rouge	Yes	Yes
1990	Diary for My Mother and Father	Yes	Yes
1992	Edith és Marlene/Edith and Marlene (TV Movie)	Yes	No
1994	Foetus	Yes	Yes
1996	The Seventh Room	Yes	Yes
1998	Három dátum (Documentary)	Yes	
1999	A Szerencse lányai/The Daughters of Fortune	Yes	Yes
2000	Kisvilma – Az utolsó napló/Little Vilna: The Last Diary	Yes	Yes
2004	The Unburied Man	Yes	Yes
2009	Utolsó jelentés Annáról/The Last Report on Anna	Yes	Yes
2011	Ármány és szerelem Anno 1951 (TV Movie)	Yes	Yes
2017	Aurora Borealis	Yes	Yes

=== Short films ===
- ...és újtra mosolyognak/...And Smile Again (1954)
- Albertfalvai történetek (1955)
- Mindennapi történet (1955)
- Túl a Cálvin téren (1955)
- Országutak vándora (1956)
- Sa zîmbeasca toti copii (1957 documentary)
- Popas în tabara de vara (1958 documentary)
- Az élet megy tovább/Life Goes On (1959)
- Tomorrow's Shift (1959 documentary)
- Az eladás müvészete (1960)
- Szerkezettervezés/Structural Design (1960)
- Az öszibarack termesztése (1960)
- Egy TSZ elnökröl (1960)
- Rajtunk is múlik (1960)
- A szár és gyökér fejlödése/The Stem and Root Development (1961)
- Danulongyártás (1961)
- Szívdobogás/Heartbeat (1961)
- Vásárhelyi színek (1961)
- A labda varázsa (1962)
- Gyerekek – könyvek (1962)
- Kamaszváros (1962)
- Nagyüzemi tojástermelés (1962)
- Tornyai János (1962)
- 1963. július 27, szombat (1963)
- Munka vagy hiratás (1963)
- Szeretet/Love (1963)
- Bóbita (1964)
- Festök városa – Szentendre (1964)
- Kiáltó/Crying (1964)
- 15 perc – 15 évröl (1965)
- Borsos Miklós (1966 documentary)
- Harangok városa – Veszprém/City of Bells (1966)
- Mészáros László emlékére (1968)
- A lörinci fonóban (1971)
- Ave Maria (1986 documentary)
- The Miraculous Manderin (2001)
- Magyarország 2011 (segment, 2012)

=== Television shows ===
- Teatr telewizji (TV Series) (2 Episodes)
- Vieras (1984) (5 part TV series for Finnish television channel Mainostelevisio)
- Edith i Marlene (1998)
- Urodziny mistrza (2000)

== Awards ==
Berlin International Film Festival:

- 2007 – Won – Berlinale Camera
- 1994 – Nominated – Golden Berlin Bear for A magzat
- 1987 – Won – OCIC Award for Diary for my Lovers
- 1987 – Won – Silver Berlin Bear for Diary for my Lovers
- 1987 – Nominated – Golden Berlin Bear for Diary for my Lovers
- 1977 – Won – OCIC Award Recommendation for Kilenc hónap
- 1975 – Won – C.I.D.A.L.C. Award Recommendation for Adoption
- 1975 – Won – Golden Berlin Bear for Adoption
- 1975 – Won – Interfilm Award/Otto Dibelius Film Award for Adoption
- 1975 – Won – OCIC Award Recommendation for Adoption

Cannes Film Festival:

- 1984 – Won – Grand Prize of the Jury for Diary for my Children
- 1984 – Nominated – Palme d'Or for Diary for my Children
- 1980 – Nominated – Palme d'Or for Örökség
- 1977 – Won – FIPRESCI Prize for Kilenc hónap

Chicago International Film Festival:

- 2010 – Won – Gold Plaque – The Last Report on Anna
- 2017 – Won – Audience Choice Award for Best Narrative Foreign-Language Feature Aurora Borealis

Karlovy Vary International Film Festival:

- 2005 – Nominated – Crystal Globe for A temetetlen halott

Moscow International Film Festival:

- 2010 – Nominated – Golden St. George for The Last Report on Anna

Polish Film Awards:

- 2001 – Nominated – Best Director for Aurora Borealis

San Sebastian International Film Festival:

- 1978 – Won – Silver Seashell for Olyan mint otthon

Stony Brook Film Festival:

- 2018 – Won – Special Recognition for Aurora Borealis

Venice Film Festival:

- 1995 – Won – Elvira Notari Prize/Special Mention for The Seventh Room
- 1995 – Won – OCIC Award for The Seventh Room

Hungarian Film Awards

- 1977 - Balázs Béla Award
- 1985 - Merited Artist of Hungary Award
- 1989 - National Trade Union Council's Award
- 1990 - Kossuth Prize
- 1995 - Imre Nagy Memorial Plaque
- 1996 - Order of Merit of the Hungarian Republic: Officer's Cross
- 2003 - Master of the Hungarian Motion Picture
