= The Seventh Room =

- Directed by: Márta Mészáros
- Starring: Maia Morgenstern; Jan Nowicki
- Cinematography: Piotr Sobociński
- Release date: 1995 (VFF)
- Running time: 108 minutes
- Countries: Italy, Germany, Hungary
- Languages: Hungarian, German

The Seventh Room (Hungarian: A hetedik szoba) is a 1995 Italian-Hungarian biography film based on the life of Edith Stein.

== Plot ==
Edith Stein grew up in a devout Jewish family round the turn of the century in Breslau. Already at a young age she was interested in philosophy, which she later studied in Göttingen and Freiburg. When Edith converted to the Catholic faith, most of the contact with her family breaks off. In the 1920s, Edith Stein worked as a teacher at the St. Magdalena girls' school in Speyer.

After the rise of the Nazis and the beginning persecution of the Jews put an end to her teaching activities, Edith joined the Discalced Carmelite order's convent in Cologne-Lindenthal in 1933, where she took the name Sister Teresia Benedicta a Cruce. It was difficult for her to acclimatise herself, but as a nun she found her personal fulfillment. Shortly before the outbreak of the Second World War, she was sent to a convent in the Netherlands. When the Nazi's persecution of Jews increased, Edith was deported to Auschwitz and murdered in the gas chamber there in 1942.

== Cast ==
- Maia Morgenstern - Edith Stein (dubbed by Juli Básti)
- Jan Nowicki - Franz Heller (dubbed by Gábor Máté)
- Anna Polony - Sister Giuseppa (dubbed by Éva Szabó)
- Elide Melli - Rosa (dubbed by Adél Kováts)
- Giovanni Capalbo - Paul (dubbed by Lajos Cs. Németh)
- Adriana Asti - Augusta (dubbed by Ilona Kállay)
- Jerzy Radziwiłowicz - Hans
- Cintia Lodetti
- Nella Ammendola
- Ileana Carini - Erna (dubbed by Éva Szerencsi)
- Zsuzsa Czinkóczi - Dora
- Ryszard Lukowski - Jakob
- Jerzy Bińczycki
- Teresa Budzisz-Krzyżanowska
- Fanny Ardant
