= Diary for My Lovers =

1987 film

- Directed by: Márta Mészáros
- Written by: Márta Mészáros; Éva Pataki
- Starring: Zsuzsa Czinkóczi
- Cinematography: Nyika Jancsó
- Release date: 1 October 1987
- Running time: 141 minutes
- Country: Hungary
- Languages: Hungarian; Russian

Diary for My Lovers (Hungarian: Napló szerelmeimnek) is a 1987 Hungarian drama film directed by Márta Mészáros. It was entered into the 37th Berlin International Film Festival, where it won the Silver Bear for outstanding single achievement. The film was selected as the Hungarian entry for the Best Foreign Language Film at the 60th Academy Awards, but was not accepted as a nominee. It is the second film of the autobiographical trilogy, preceded by Diary for My Children and followed by Diary for My Father and Mother. The film contains documentary footage integrated with the story.

== Cast ==
- Zsuzsa Czinkóczi as Juli Kovács
- Ágnes Csere as Juli (voice)
- Anna Polony as Magda Egri
- Mária Ronyecz as Magda (voice)
- Jan Nowicki as János
- Tamás Végvári as János (voice)
- Irina Kouberskaya as Anna Pavlova
- Erika Szegedi as Anna Pavlova (voice)
- Mari Szemes as Grandma
- Pál Zolnay as Grandpa
- Vilmos Kun as Grandpa (voice)
- Adél Kováts as Natasa
- Erzsébet Kútvölgyi as Erzsi
- Jerzy Bińczycki as Professor
- László Vajda as Professor (voice)
- Gyula Bartus as Dezsõ

== See also ==
- List of submissions to the 60th Academy Awards for Best Foreign Language Film
- List of Hungarian submissions for the Academy Award for Best Foreign Language Film
