= The Heiresses (1980 film) =

1980 film

- Directed by: Márta Mészáros
- Written by: Ildikó Kórody; Márta Mészáros
- Starring: Isabelle Huppert
- Cinematography: Elemér Ragályi
- Edited by: Annamaria Szanto; Richard Todd
- Music by: Zsolt Düme
- Distributed by: Gaumont Distribution (France)
- Release date: 13 November 1980
- Running time: 105 minutes
- Countries: Hungary; France
- Language: Hungarian

The Heiresses (Hungarian: Örökség) is a 1980 Hungarian drama film directed by Márta Mészáros and starring Isabelle Huppert. It was entered into the 1980 Cannes Film Festival.

== Cast ==
- Isabelle Huppert - Irène
- Erzsébet Kútvölgyi - Iréne (voice)
- Lili Monori - Szilvia
- Jan Nowicki - Ákos
- Sándor Oszter - Ákos (voice)
- Juci Komlós - Teréz (voice)
- Zita Perczel - Teréz
- Sándor Szabó - Komáromi
- Zsolt Körtvélyessy
- Witold Holtz
- Éva Gyulányi
- Zoltán Jancsó
- Piotr Skrzynecki - Fülöp bácsi (as Piotr Skrzinecki)
- Kati Sír
- Károly Mécs
