= The Unburied Man =

2004 film

- Directed by: Márta Mészáros
- Starring: Jan Nowicki; György Cserhalmi
- Release date: 21 October 2004
- Running time: 127 minutes
- Countries: Hungary; Slovakia; Poland
- Language: Hungarian

The Unburied Man (Hungarian: A temetetlen halott) is a 2004 Hungarian-Slovak-Polish drama film. It is based on the life of former Prime Minister of Hungary, Imre Nagy, who was executed following the failed Hungarian Revolution of 1956.

== Cast ==
- Jan Nowicki - Imre Nagy
- Marianna Moór - Mária Égető, his wife
- Lili Horváth - Erzsébet Nagy, their daughter
- György Cserhalmi - prison doctor
- Jan Frycz - interrogation officer
- Pál Mácsai - presiding justice Ferenc Vida
- János Kulka - Gyula Kállai
- Frigyes Hollósi - Yugoslavian ambassador
- Péter Andorai - Ferenc Münnich
- Vladimír Hajdu
