= Just like Home (1978 film) =

1978 film

- Directed by: Márta Mészáros
- Written by: Márta Mészáros; Ildikó Kórody
- Starring: Anna Karina
- Cinematography: Lajos Koltai
- Edited by: Éva Kármentő
- Release date: 26 October 1978
- Running time: 110 minutes
- Country: Hungary
- Language: Hungarian

Just like Home (Hungarian: Olyan mint otthon) is a 1978 Hungarian drama film directed by Márta Mészáros and starring Anna Karina.

== Cast ==
- Zsuzsa Czinkóczi - Zsuzsi
- Jan Nowicki - András Novák
- Anna Karina - Anna
- Ildikó Pécsi - Zsuzsi's mother
- Kornélia Sallay - András's mother
- Ferenc Bencze - András's father
- Mária Dudás
- Éva Gyulányi
- Zsolt Horváth
- Éva Szabó - Éva
- László Szabó - Laci
- András Szigeti - president of the co-operative
- Hédi Temessy - Klára
