= Diary for My Children =

1984 film

- Directed by: Márta Mészáros
- Written by: Márta Mészáros
- Starring: Zsuzsa Czinkóczi
- Cinematography: Nyika Jancsó
- Edited by: Éva Kármentő
- Release date: 3 May 1984
- Running time: 106 minutes
- Country: Hungary
- Languages: Hungarian, Russian

Diary for My Children (Hungarian: Napló gyermekeimnek) is a 1984 Hungarian drama film directed by Márta Mészáros. It was entered into the 1984 Cannes Film Festival, where it won the Grand Prix Spécial du Jury. In July 2021, the film was shown in the Cannes Classics section at the Cannes Film Festival. It is the first film of the autobiographical trilogy, followed by Diary for My Lovers and Diary for My Father and Mother. The film contains documentary footage integrated with the story.

== Cast ==
- Zsuzsa Czinkóczi as Juli
- Anna Polony as Magda, Juli's adoptive mother
- Teri Földi as Magda (voice)
- Jan Nowicki as János
- Sándor Oszter as János (voice)
- Mari Szemes as Grandma
- Pál Zolnay as Grandpa
- Vilmos Kun as Grandpa (voice)
- Ildikó Bánsági as Juli's mother (in flashbacks)
- Jan Nowicki as Juli's father (in flashbacks)
- Éva Szabó as Ilonka, Magda's housekeeper
- Tamás Tóth as János's son
