= Anna Polony =

Polish actress (born 1939)

Professor formerly Her Magnificence Anna Polony
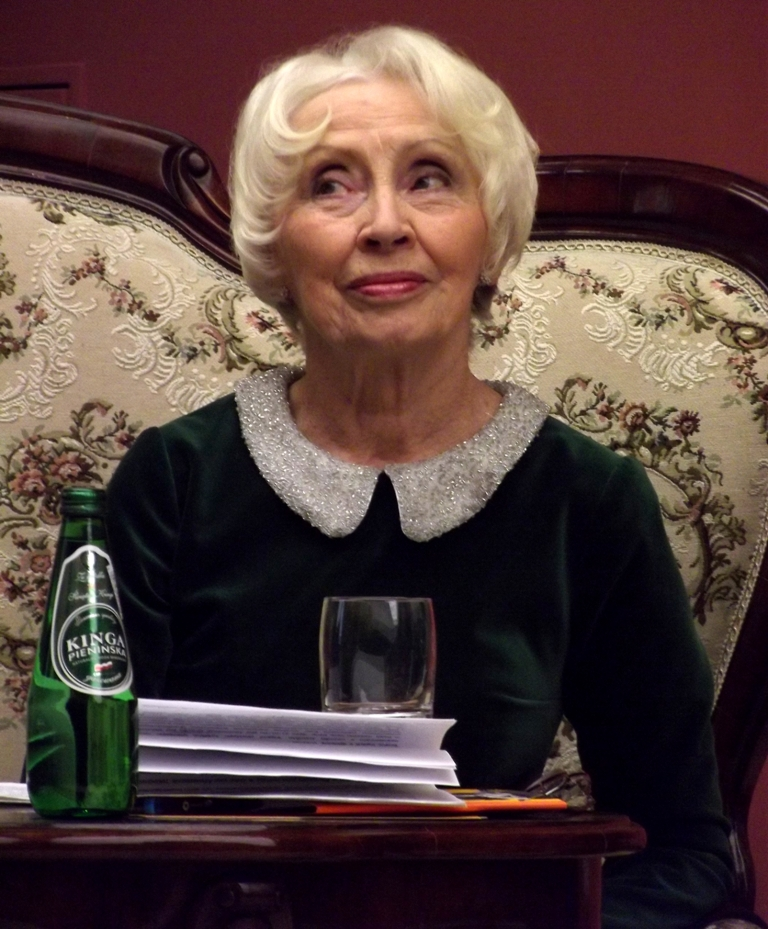
- Anna Polony in 2013
- Born: Anna Władysława Polony; 21 January 1939 (age 87); Kraków, Poland
- Occupations: Actress, theatre director, professor of theatre arts
- Years active: since 1959
- Spouse: Marek Walczewski (divorced)
- Awards: Polish Film Award for Best Supporting Actress (2009)

Anna Polony (born 21 January 1939) is a Polish actress and theatre director. She is former Prorector of the Academy of Dramatic Arts in Kraków. The media dubbed Polony 'the First Lady of Polish Theatre' or 'the Dame of the Polish Theatre".

== Career ==
Polony studied acting at the Ludwik Solski Academy of Dramatic Arts in Kraków and graduated in 1960. Later she completed her studies in stage directing at her alma mater (1984) and became one of its legendary professors. Polony trained dozens of famous Polish actors including Jan Frycz, Magdalena Cielecka and Sonia Bohosiewicz. The latter of whom recalled that "being a fragile, dove-hearted being, she [Polony] wanted students to be afraid of her".

Polony made her acting debut in Jerzy Kaliszewski's adaptation of Jean Giraudoux's play Wojny trojańskiej nie będzie (English: The Trojan War Will Not Take Place) in 1959 at the Helena Modrzejewska National Stary Theater in Kraków (or simply the Old Theatre). She was a member of the Old Theatre's troupe until 2002 and remained its guest actress until 2014. She is known as the theatrical muse of several renowned Polish directors including Konrad Swinarski, Andrzej Wajda and Krystian Lupa.

She became active as a theatre director in the latter part of her acting career. Her directing career began in 1974 with the production of William Gibson's Two for the Seesaw. Later she became one of the most prominent directors of the Old Theatre. Throughout the 1980s and 1990s, Polony received nationwide recognition and success as a theatre director. The most notable plays she directed include Harold Pinter's The Birthday Party, Sławomir Mrożek's Widows, and Shakespeare's The Taming of the Shrew.

== Filmography ==
- Kontrybucja (1966) as Wronka
- Z biegiem lat, z biegiem dni... (1980) as Aniela Dulska
- Dziady (1983) (TV) as Woman and Ewa
- Diary for My Children (1984) as Magda Egri
- Diary for My Lovers (1987) as Magda Egri
- Dekalog (1988) (TV, Episode 7) as Ewa
- Napló apámnak, anyámnak (1990) as Magda Egri
- Dwa księżyce (1993) as Walentyna Krajewska
- The Seventh Chamber (1995) as Sister Giuseppa
- Na dobre i na złe (TV) as dr Miller
- Wszyscy święci (2002) (TV) as Krystyna's Mother
- Stacyjka (2004) (TV mini-series) as Zofia Wielska
- Home on the Range (2004) as Mrs. Calloway (voice, Polish Dub)
- Magda M. as Natalia Podgórska
- Iron Cross (2009) as Frau Ganz
