= Jan Nowicki =

Polish actor (1939–2022)

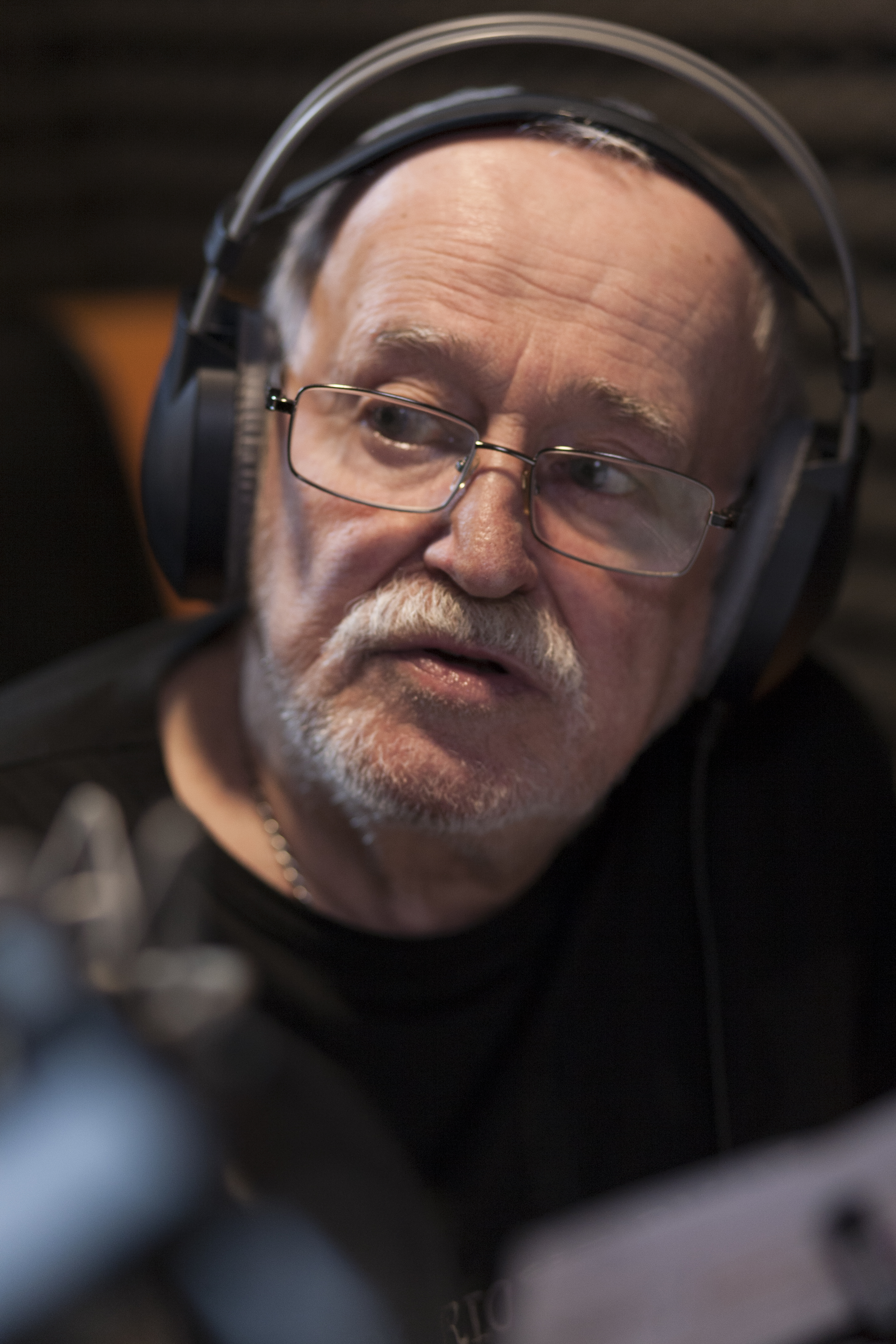
- Nowicki in 2017
- Born: 5 November 1939; Kowal, Reichsgau Posen, Germany (now Kuyavian-Pomeranian Voivodeship, Poland)
- Died: 7 December 2022 (aged 83); Krzewent, Poland
- Occupation: Actor
- Years active: 1956–2022
- Spouses: Márta Mészáros (div. 2008); Małgorzata Potocka (m. 2009; div. 2015); Anna Kondratowicz (m. 2016)
- Children: 2, including Łukasz Nowicki

Jan Nowicki reads "Fortepian Szopena" Norwida (sample of voice)

Jan Nowicki (5 November 1939 – 7 December 2022) was a Polish actor.

== Biography ==
He appeared in 90 films and television episodes since 1967.

He had two children, Sajana Nowicka and Łukasz Nowicki, a television presenter, journalist, and actor known for his work in theatre, film, and dubbing.

Nowicki died on 7 December 2022, at the age of 83.

== Selected filmography ==
- Bariera (1966)
- Colonel Wolodyjowski (1969)
- Family Life (1971)
- The Hourglass Sanatorium (1973)
- Women (1977)
- Spiral (1978)
- Just Like Home (1978)
- The Heiresses (1980)
- W biały dzień (1980) as lawyer, Ewa's husband
- Diary for My Children (1984)
- O-Bi, O-Ba: The End of Civilization (1985)
- Diary for My Lovers (1987)
- Magnat (1987)
- A Tale of Adam Mickiewicz's 'Forefathers' Eve' (1989)
- Foetus (1994)
- The Seventh Chamber (1995)
- The Unburied Man (2004)
