= Tibor Szilágyi =

Hungarian film, stage and television actor (1942–2026)

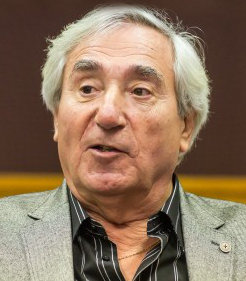
- Szilágyi in 2015
- Born: 28 August 1942; Budapest, Hungary
- Died: 2 July 2026 (aged 83)
- Occupation: Actor
- Years active: 1965–2011

Tibor Szilágyi (28 August 1942 – 2 July 2026) was a Hungarian film, stage and television actor. A recipient of the Jászai Mari Award and the Kossuth Prize, he appeared in over 170 films and television programs between 1965 to 2011, and was best known for playing Ensign Pozdor in the 1966 film Hideg Napok.

Szilágyi died on 2 July 2026, at the age of 83.
