= Zsuzsa Czinkóczi =

Hungarian actress (born 1967)

- Born: 23 January 1967 (age 59)
- Occupation: Actress

Zsuzsa Czinkóczi (born 23 January 1967) is a Hungarian actress. Her best-known work includes Nobody's Daughter (1976), Just Like Home (1978), Diary for My Children (1984), Diary for My Lovers (1987), and Diary for My Father and Mother (1990).
