= Diana Ringo =

Finnish film director and composer (born 1992)

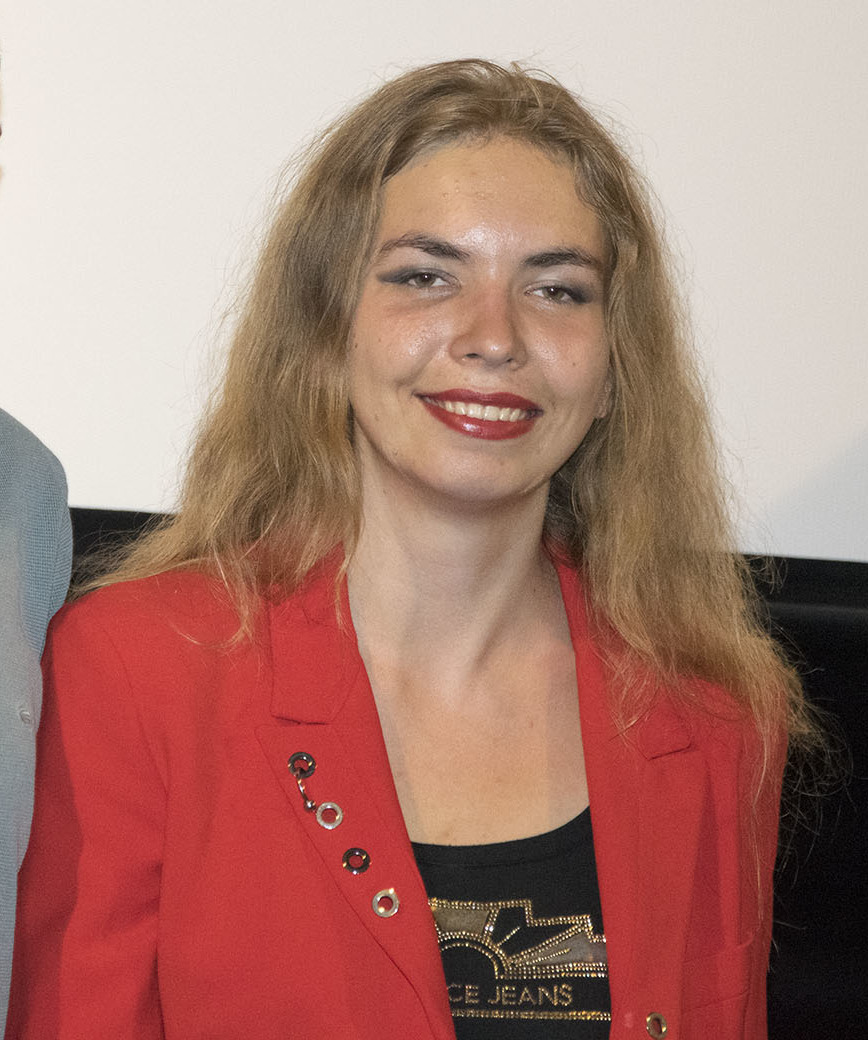
- Ringo in 2017
- Born: March 8, 1992 (age 34)
- Citizenship: Finnish
- Occupations: Film director; producer; screenwriter; composer; musician; visual artist
- Musical career
- Genres: Electronic; ambient; classical; film score
- Instruments: Keyboards; synthesizer
- Website: dianaringo.com

Diana Ringo (born 8 March 1992) is a Finnish film director, composer and visual artist. She is best known for the films Quarantine (2021) and 1984 (2023).

== Biography ==
Diana was born in the family of Finnish researcher Reijo Mononen and Russian-Finnish artist Elena Ringo. Her great-grandfathers are inventor Josef Ringo and mathematician Sergey Nikolsky.

Her director debut is dystopian feature film drama Quarantine (2021) which was shortlisted for the 2022 Golden Globes as a foreign entry. She was also composer of the film and for the film's score she wrote 26 original tracks.

In November 2022 it was announced that her feature film based on George Orwell's dystopian novel Nineteen Eighty-Four would be released in 2023. Her film 1984 was released on 15 November 2023.

In February 2025, the trailer for The Curse of Modigliani was released. The film, starring Edward Pishiyski and based on an original screenplay by Diana Ringo, marks her first English-language feature. Shot in Helsinki, the film was released on 7 December 2025.

Diana Ringo's directorial style has been compared to the works of Andrei Tarkovsky, Terrence Malick and Aleksandr Sokurov.

Her music for the film Million Loves in Me by Sampson Yuen won the award for the Best Original Score at the LAFA Awards in 2020. She also composed the score for the Santa Monica College short film Hinge by Lisa Mayo in 2019.

Diana grew up in Helsinki and was interested in music since early childhood. At the age of five, pianist Dmitry Soloviev, discovered that Diana has perfect pitch. She started to study piano and Soloviev became her first music teacher.

She studied piano with famous pianists such as Janne Mertanen, Risto Lauriala. She has attended master classes by the Hollywood composer Lalo Schifrin, directors Paul Verhoeven and David Lynch.

Diana Ringo is a classically educated pianist. Her original compositions combine classical and romantic influences with modern electronics and synthesizers. Her favorite classical composers are Bach, Beethoven and Chopin. Film score composers whose works have influenced Diana Ringo include Ennio Morricone, Dmitri Shostakovich, Michel Legrand, Giorgio Moroder and Lalo Schifrin.

She is also a singer. On 17 August 2025 she released her single titled "Happy Mealz" off her post-punk album Cyberwolf. The album was released on 17 October 2025. Her second album Clowns in America was released on 3 July 2026. Music critics have described Ringo's musical style as avant-garde post-punk incorporating elements of darkwave, experimental rock and synthwave.

In 2020 Diana Ringo was the first Finnish woman to pose in the Playboy Spain magazine.

As a visual artist and painter, Diana works with oil, gouache, digital techniques, collage and mixed media.

== Filmography ==
=== Film director ===
- Quarantine (2021)
- 1984 (2023)
- The Curse of Modigliani (2025)

=== Composer ===
- Million Loves in Me (2018)

== Awards ==
- Best Score – Hinge (Vienna Independent Film Festival 2019)
- Best Score – Million Loves in Me (Los Angeles Film Awards 2020)
- Best Score – Million Loves in Me (WICA Los Angeles 2021)
- Best Visual Effects or Design – Quarantine (ES Europe International Film Festival 2021)
- Best Overall Film, Best Director, and Best Editing – 1984 (WorldFilmGeek Awards 2024)
