= Rolf Bossi =

German criminal defence lawyer

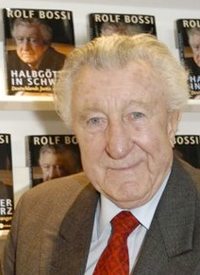
- Bossi in 2008
- Born: September 10, 1923; Karlsruhe, Germany
- Died: December 22, 2015 (aged 92); Düsseldorf, Germany
- Occupation: Criminal defence lawyer
- Known for: High-profile criminal defence cases
- Spouses: (first wife; died 2000); (m. 2002)
- Children: 2

Rolf Bossi (10 September 1923, Karlsruhe – 22 December 2015, Düsseldorf) was a German criminal defense lawyer. He was known for defending prominent actors such as Ingrid van Bergen and Romy Schneider, as well as criminals such as Jürgen Bartsch, Dieter Zlof, and Dieter Degowski. He defended four former East German border guards who were accused of having killed Chris Gueffroy, who was trying to escape over the Berlin Wall. He was considered to be one of Germany's best-known defense lawyers. He wrote an autobiography, appeared in talk shows and even had two film roles.

== Career ==
After his father was executed by the Nazi regime, Bossi decided to pursue a career in law. He began his legal career in Munich in 1952, where he lived and worked for many years. One of his earliest cases involved the defence of a postal worker who had embezzled registered mail in order to pay for the care of his disabled child.

His public profile increased significantly around 1970 following a successful appeal in the case of Jürgen Bartsch. Bartsch, who had committed multiple murders as a minor and was initially sentenced to life imprisonment, had his conviction revised after Bossi argued for the application of juvenile criminal law, resulting in a reduced sentence combined with institutional placement.

Bossi became nationally known through his role as defence counsel in a series of high-profile criminal trials, which contributed significantly to the public visibility of criminal defence law in the Federal Republic of Germany. Among his most notable cases were the defence of actress Ingrid van Bergen, who had killed her partner, the Oetker kidnapper Dieter Zlof, and the Gladbeck hostage-taker Dieter Degowski.

During the 1970s and 1980s, Bossi established a reputation as Germany’s most prominent so-called Starverteidiger (celebrity defence lawyer). Contemporary commentators noted his emphasis on forensic rhetoric, psychological arguments, and the use of psychiatric expertise in criminal trials. He was among the lawyers who contributed to a broader acceptance of diminished responsibility and psychological evaluation in German criminal proceedings, particularly in the period of criminal law reform following the Second World War.

After German reunification, Bossi attracted controversy for his defence of former East German border guards in trials related to killings at the Berlin Wall. Critics accused him of obstructing the search for truth, while supporters argued that he was fulfilling the role of defence counsel under the rule of law.

In his book Halbgötter in Schwarz, Bossi openly criticised aspects of the German justice system and reflected on his professional experiences.

== Personal life ==
Bossi’s first wife died in 2000. She brought a daughter into the marriage, and the couple had one daughter together.

In 2002, Bossi married his partner, who was also widowed. He lived for a time in the Munich district of Bogenhausen and, after retiring, moved his primary residence to Gevelsberg, his wife’s hometown. From December 2014, the couple lived in Düsseldorf.

== Death ==
Bossi died on 22 December 2015 at the age of 92 after a serious illness. He was buried at the Nordfriedhof in Düsseldorf.
