= Aleksandr Obmanov =

Russian actor and screenwriter

Alexander Obmanov
- Born: Alexander Vladimirovich Obmanov; August 6, 1989 (age 37); Volgograd, RSFSR, USSR
- Occupations: Actor; screenwriter
- Years active: 2007–present

Alexander Vladimirovich Obmanov (Russian: Александр Владимирович Обманов; born August 6, 1989) is a Russian actor and screenwriter. He is best known for starring in the films 1984 (2023) and Quarantine (2021).

== Biography ==
Obmanov was born on August 6, 1989. His interest in the arts began during his school years, and in 2012 he graduated from the directing faculty of the Volgograd State Institute of Arts and Culture under the mentorship of E. L. Basilashvili. After obtaining his diploma, he continued to refine his acting skills at the School of Drama under German Sidakov, completing his studies in 2018. As a theater actor, Obmanov is primarily associated with avant-garde projects. He collaborated with the youth independent intellectual theater Re/Actor in Saint Petersburg, performing in productions such as Where Souls Burn (as Vaclav Leshchinsky) and I Want to Kiss You (as Sergio Garanti).

His cinematic career began in 2014 with appearances in various television series, mostly in episodic roles.

His first significant on-screen role came in 2021, when he portrayed the lead character Kirill in the drama Quarantine, directed by Diana Ringo. The film also featured Honored Artist of Russia Anatoliy Beliy.

In 2023, Obmanov reunited with Diana Ringo for the science fiction film 1984, an adaptation of George Orwell's classic novel. He played the protagonist, a brilliant mathematician facing a difficult choice in a dystopian society. The same year, it was announced that Obmanov would work as a screenwriter for the project Treasure Island, based on the classic novel. The film received funding from the Russian Ministry of Culture.

== Incident ==
On February 5, 2025, in Moscow, Alexander Obmanov was mistakenly detained by Spetsnaz for allegedly possessing a 'suicide belt', which was later revealed to be a prop from the 2024 film Komandir, in which Obmanov portrayed a terrorist. The misunderstanding arose when the son of his landlord, illegally searching the apartment and violating Obmanov’s privacy, found the prop and mistook it for an actual explosive device.

== Filmography ==
=== Film ===
- 2024 – Komandir – Andrei Kulakov, terrorist
- 2023 – 1984 (Russia, Finland) – Mathematician D-503 (lead role)
- 2021 – Quarantine (Russia, Finland) – Kirill (lead role)
- 2018 – T-34 – Hans

=== TV ===
- 2024 – By the Laws of War: The Enemy Behind – Major Chubrikov
- 2023 – GDR – Oleg Fedorovsky
- 2023 – Balabol-7 – Bril, Major
- 2022 – The Tёlki – Policeman
- 2022 – Spasskaya: New Episodes – Roman Arkhangelsky
- 2022 – Cold | Film 5
- 2022 – Conclusion – Garik, Pimp
- 2021 – Fate's Transcript – Ilya Markov, Business Partner of Vladimir
- 2021 – Cathedral – Alexei
- 2021 – Moscow Gas: Case No. 8 – Trap – Episodic role
- 2021 – Historian – Oleg Tokarev, Journalist
- 2018 – Memento Mori
- 2018 – Explosion – Dimon
- 2018 – Duet by Right – Boris
- 2017 – Philology Department
- 2016 – Everything by Law – Duty Investigator
- 2015 – Search-3 – Smolikov
- 2014 – Craftsmen
- 2014 – Search-3 – Episodic role
- 2013 – Silent Hunt – Seva
- 2013 – Red Mountains
- 2013 – Explosion Point
- 2012 – Waiting for Spring
- 2011 – Friday
- 2011 – Moscow. Three Stations – Kirill Lomov
- 2011 – The Eighties
- 2011 – Univer. New Dorm – Lyubimov
- 2010 – Mine
- 2010 – Real Boys
- 2010 – Gimme Youth!
- 2007 – Daddy's Daughters

=== Short films ===
- 2022 – Not Father (lead role)
