= Jewish question (disambiguation) =

The Jewish question was a debate in 19th and 20th-century Europe that pertained to the status and treatment of Jews.

Jewish question may also refer to:

- The Jewish Question, a 1912 book by Arno Clemens Gaebelein
- The Jewish Question in its Historical Context and its Proposed Solution, a 1917 book by Josef Ringo
- The Jewish Question, an 1843 essay by Bruno Bauer
- On The Jewish Question, an 1844 commentary by Karl Marx on Bruno Bauer's 1843 The Jewish Question
- The Jewish Question in the Classroom, a 1937 book by Julius Streicher
- The Jewish Question over Five Centuries, a 1939 book by Julius Streicher
- Final solution to the Jewish question, 1942, the Nazis' plan for genocide against the European Jewish population during World War II
- Reflections on the Jewish Question, a 1946 essay by Jean-Paul Sartre; original title: Réflexions sur la question juive
- The Jewish Question, a 1995 book by Yevgenia Albats
- The Jewish Question, a 1883 collection of antisemitic essays by Ivan Aksakov

== See also ==
- Final Solution (disambiguation)
