= 1984 (2023 film) =

2023 science fiction film

- Film poster
- Directed by: Diana Ringo
- Written by: Diana Ringo
- Based on: Nineteen Eighty-Four by George Orwell; We by Yevgeny Zamyatin
- Produced by: Diana Ringo
- Starring: Aleksandr Obmanov; Vladimir Ivaniy; Aleksey Sharanin; Diana Ringo; Sergey Khrustalev
- Cinematography: Diana Ringo
- Edited by: Diana Ringo
- Music by: Diana Ringo
- Production company: AElita Productions
- Release date: 15 November 2023 (Amazon Prime)
- Running time: 132 minutes
- Countries: Finland, Russia
- Language: Russian

1984 is a 2023 Finnish-Russian sci-fi dystopian black comedy drama film directed by Diana Ringo. The film is based upon George Orwell's 1949 novel of the same name as well as Yevgeny Zamyatin's 1920–1921 novel We. It was well-received by critics.

== Plot ==
In a society dominated by the omnipresent surveillance of government organisation Big Brother, individual liberties are a distant memory. Art is scorned and fantasy is deemed a perilous affliction. Amid this oppressive landscape, a mathematician finds himself entangled in a forbidden affair with a fellow intellectual. In a world where freedom is slavery, and any opposition to the iron rule carries deadly consequences, he faces a difficult choice: whether to join the resistance against the all-powerful Big Brother or remain an obedient citizen of the United State.

== Cast ==
- Aleksandr Obmanov as Mathematician D503
- Vladimir Ivaniy as Prisoner E202
- Aleksey Sharanin as Philologist C340
- Diana Ringo as Fiction department employee I-330
- Evgeniy Kazak as Concert host
- Ilya Yaroslavtsev as Party Member
- Viktor Korovin as Medical assistant
- Sergei Nikitin as Engineer R-13
- Ilya Droznin as Prison guard
- Anton Biryukov as Enemy of the people L723
- Vladislav Kuvitsyn as Younger doctor
- Sergey Budanov as Older doctor
- Dima Rubin as Inner Party Official
- Sergei Khrustalyov as Inner Party Official
- Aleksei Shamayev as Minister of the United State
- Maksim Shilov as Police officer

== Production ==
My film “1984” is a reflection on freedom and unfreedom, the dehumanization of society, truth and falsification, propaganda and manipulation of public opinion.

— Diana Ringo

The film is the third feature film adaptation of the novel 1984 by George Orwell. It is dedicated to the 120th birth anniversary of George Orwell.

It was shot in Moscow. 1984 is an independently produced film made without Russian government support or other government funds. Ringo has said in an interview to David Ryan (author of George Orwell on Screen) that she wished to make a film which would show the humorous and satiric side of "1984". When writing the screenplay, she was also influenced by the novel We by Yevgeny Zamyatin, which served as inspiration for George Orwell when he was writing 1984. Orwell praised the novel We, of which he also wrote a review in 1946. We has a similar plot and atmosphere as the novel 1984.

The film's soundtrack was composed entirely by Diana Ringo.

== Release ==
The first trailer of 1984 was released on November 21, 2022.

1984 was released on digital streaming by Prime Video on November 15, 2023. The final film trailer was also released on the same day.

In 2024 the film was selected for the competition program at the Ravno Selo Film Festival in Serbia.

In February 2026, the film was re-released as a remastered edition, featuring 114 updated CGI shots.

== Reception ==
WorldFilmGeek praised the film, giving it an A rating, commending the blend of George Orwell's novel with Yevgeny Zamaytin's "We". The review highlighted the performances and directing. The film won Best Overall Film, Best Director, and Best Editing at the 2024 WorldFilmGeek Awards.

Randall Larson gave a positive review of the film's score in his Soundtrax column.
