= Komandir =

2024 Russian film by Aleksandr Guryanov and Timur Khvan

Commander
- Film poster
- Directed by: Aleksandr Guryanov; Timur Khvan
- Written by: Timur Khvan; Tatyana Guryanova; Aleksandr Guryanov
- Produced by: Timur Khvan; Nadezhda Churkina; Kirill Zaytsev; Ulyana Savelevar; Arseny Ovchinnikov
- Starring: Kirill Zaytsev; Artyom Tkachenko; Valery Barinov; Nelly Pshonnaya; Sergey Makhovikov; Vladimir Zaytsev
- Cinematography: Andrey Katorzhenko
- Edited by: Timur Khvan; Kirill Davletshin; Aleksandr Zverev; Aleksey Ryazantsev
- Music by: Pavel Esenin
- Production company: EGO Production
- Distributed by: Karro Film Distribution
- Release date: February 22, 2024 (Russia)
- Running time: 144 minutes
- Country: Russia
- Language: Russian
- Budget: ₽230 million
- Box office: ₽165 million

Commander (Russian: Командир, romanized: Komandir, lit. 'Commander') is a 2024 Russian biographical action film written, co-produced and directed by Aleksandr Guryanov and Timur Khvan based on real events — 1988 Ordzhonikidze bus hijacking. The plot, Gennady Zaytsev grew up in a large family and he was able to overcome the difficulties of war and devastation and he became the creator of an anti-terrorist unit. And suddenly, in Ordzhonikidze, terrorists took dozens of children, a teacher and a driver hostage. Gennady will have to undergo a very complicated operation.

The story of the negotiator, commander of the Alpha Group, Major General Gennady Nikolaevich Zaytsev (played by Kirill Andreyevich Zaytsev), under whose leadership the unit gained fame as one of the most outstanding organizations in the fight against terrorism.

This film was theatrically released on February 22, 2024.

== Plot ==
The morning of December 1, 1988, which had not yet recovered from the night frosts, in the capital of Soviet North Ossetia, the city of Ordzhonikidze, USSR (now the city of Vladikavkaz, Russia), was cold, but did not foretell trouble. Going with her 4th "G" on an excursion to the Republican Book Printing House, the young teacher Natalya Efimova still does not know that four employees of the local bus company have already hatched an insidious plan: to take a group of children hostage and receive a large ransom from the authorities for them. and fly abroad. And when the class teacher was informed that a bus sent by the head of the school was waiting for her and the children at the exit after the excursion, she was even glad: they got to the printing house on their own, in the wet snow and on crosswalks, and were very tired.

So the teacher and more than 30 schoolchildren were captured by terrorists, who threatened to kill one of them every half hour if their demands were not met.

The commander of the Alpha group, Gennady Zaytsev, and his fighters are tasked with freeing the hostages without allowing the criminals to harm them.

== Cast ==
- Kirill Zaytsev as Gennady Zaytsev
- Artyom Tkachenko as Stepan Khachiyants, a terrorist
- Valery Barinov as Viktor Chebrikov
- Nelly Pshonnaya as Nadezhda Ignatieva
- Sergey Makhovikov as Aleksey Volkov
- Vladimir Zaytsev as Spiridonov

=== Other cast ===
- Aleksandr Obmanov as Andrei Kulakov, a terrorist
- Aleksey Shevchenkov as Pavel, a soldier at the station
- Marina Lebedeva as Zoya Zaytsev, Gennady Zaytsev's wife
- Vasily Neverov as Sergey Zaytsev, Gennady Zaytsev's son
- Veronica Norina as Maria, Stepan Khachiyants's wife
- Aleksandra Nikiforova as Natalya Efimova, a teacher
- Ilya Obolonkov as Morozov, Alpha Group
- Pyotr Barancheev as Colonel Valery Bochkov, an operative of the Alpha Group, 7th Directorate of the KGB of the USSR
- Aleksey Surensky as Sergey Goncharov, Alpha Group
- Yevgeny Antonov as Robert, Alpha Group
- Aleksandr Luchinin as Andrey Kirsanov, Alpha Group
- Yevgeny Berezovsky as Colonel Sergey Polyakov (English: Sergei Polyakov), Alpha Group
- Dmitry Sutyrin as Evgeny Bogdanov, Alpha Group
- Sergey Aprelsky as Captain Gennady Zudin, an operative of the Alpha Group of the, 7th Directorate of the State Security Committee under the Council of Ministers of the Soviet Union
- Matvey Zubalevich as Captain Dmitry Volkov, an operative of the Alpha Group
- Sergey Yakovlev as radio operator, Alpha Group
- Vadim Andreyev as uncle Kolya

== Production ==
The creators of the film, Timur Khvan, Tatyana Guryanova, and Aleksandr Guryanov, discovered the biography of Gennady Nikolaevich Zaytsev through his memoir, "Special Forces "Alpha": Deeds and People".

The completion of the first half of filming was announced in winter 2023, with lead actor Kirill Zaytsev sharing the news. In preparation for the role, he met with Gennady Zaytsev himself, with whom he shares his same last name. Filming concluded in late spring 2023.

The film was produced by EGO Production with the support of Rostec State Corporation, Rosoboronexport Joint Stock Company, and the Charter and Aquarius companies.

== See also ==
- Frenzied Bus, a 1990 Soviet film by director Georgy Natanson.
