= Valery Barinov =

Russian actor

- Валерий Баринов
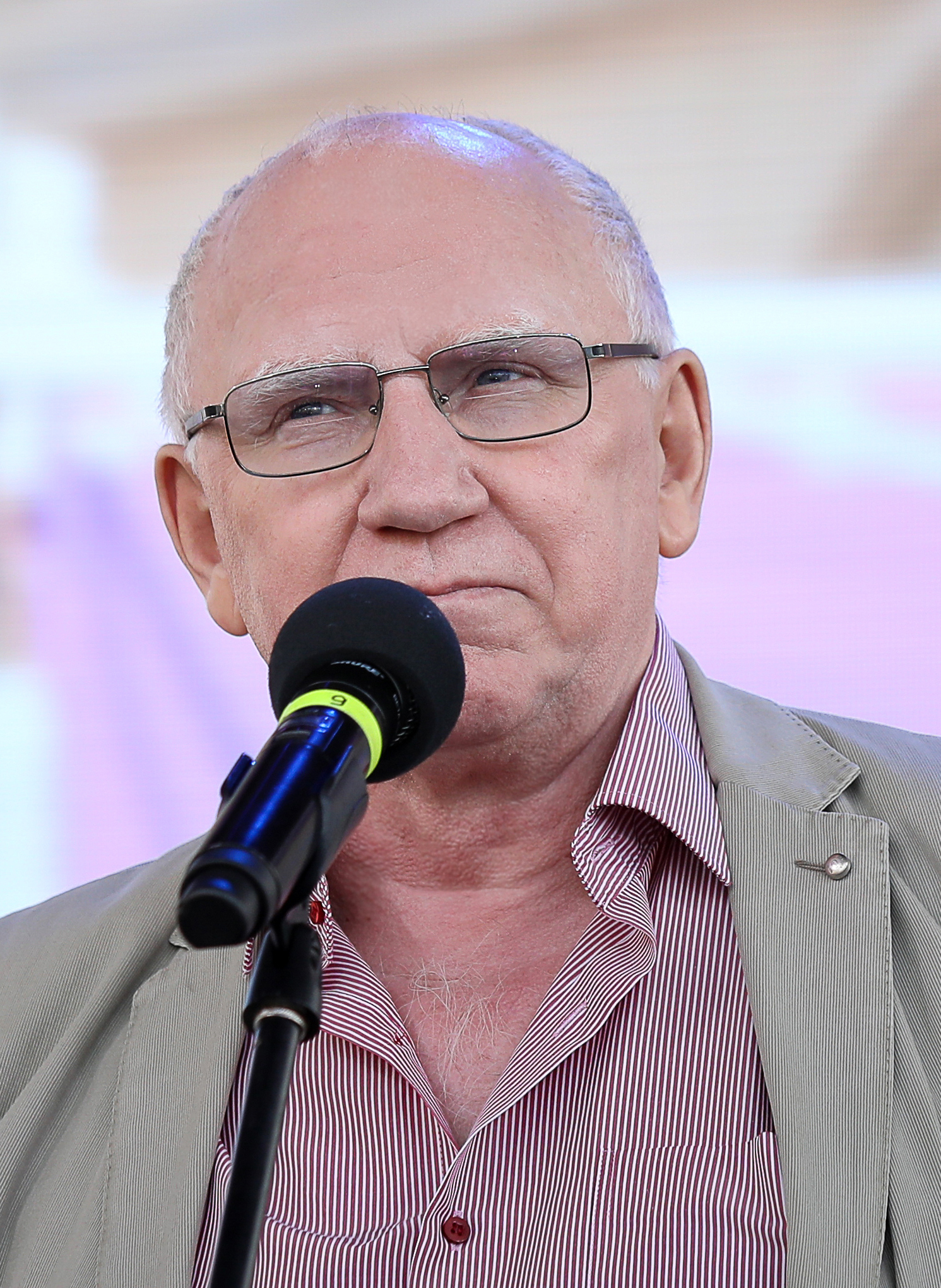
- Barinov in 2019
- Born: Valery Alexandrovich Barinov; 27 November 1945 (age 80); Zhilina, Oryol Oblast, Russia
- Education: Mikhail Shchepkin Higher Theatre School
- Occupation: Actor
- Years active: 1973–present
- Children: 1

Valery Alexandrovich Barinov (Russian: Вале́рий Алекса́ндрович Ба́ринов; born 27 November 1945) is a Russian actor. He was the People's Artist of Russia in 1999, and has appeared in more than 200 films.

== Biography ==
Valery was born in the village of Zhilina, in Russia's Oryol Oblast. He studied as an actor in the studio at the Oryol Drama Theater and at the Mikhail Shchepkin Higher Theatre School, after which he took part in the work of various theaters. In 1968, he made his film debut.

== Selected filmography ==
Year	Title	Role	Notes
1983	Red Bells II	Nikolai Podvoisky	
1984	Mr. Veliky Novgorod	The Teutonic knight	
1985	Battle of Moscow	Nikolai	
1998	Classic	Khekon	
2004	A Driver for Vera	Klimenko	
2007	Election Day	Ivan Burdun	
2007	Vanechka	Taxi driver	
2007	The Irony of Fate 2	Neighbour on the roof	
2009	Le Concert	Ivan Gavrilov	
2011	Brief Guide To A Happy Life	Vladimir Ivanovich	
2024	Commander	Viktor Cherikov	
