= Wittringen Castle =

Castle

Coordinates: 51°33′34.74″N 06°58′52.50″E

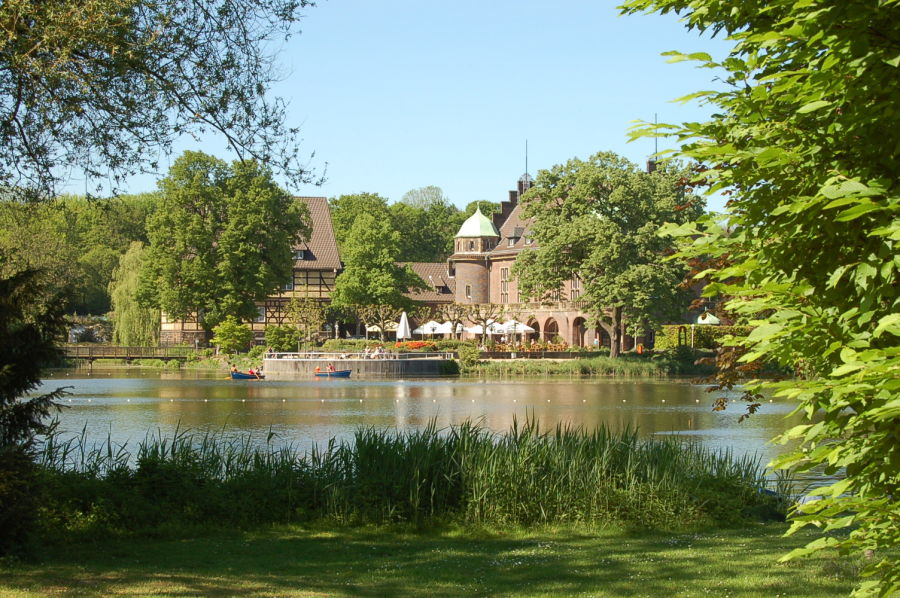
Wittringen Castle

Wittringen Castle or Wittringen House (German: Schloss Wittringen or Haus Wittringen) is a moated castle in Gladbeck, North Rhine-Westphalia, Germany.

== History ==
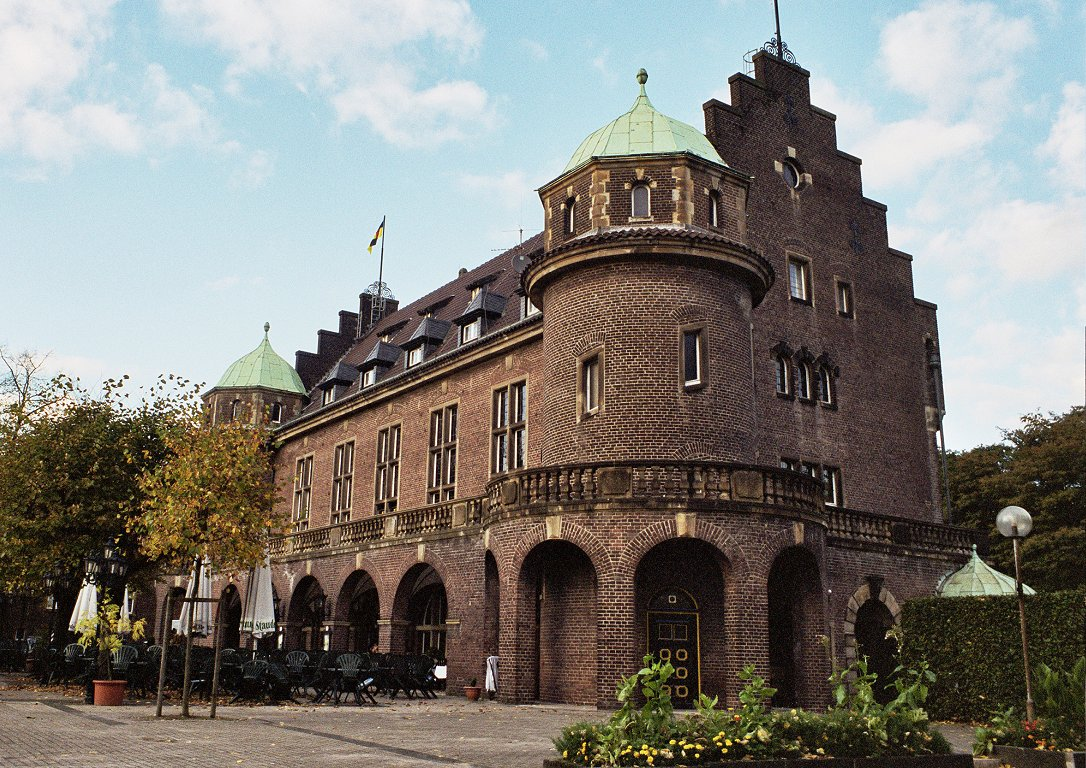
The manor house of Wittringen

The noble family von Wittringen was first mentioned in an official document from 1263. Knight Ludolfus de Witteringe is today believed to have erected the castle around that time. The exact date is, however, unclear. Another document from 1394 mentions Heinrich von Brachtbecke as the castle's owner. The three Wolfsangeln of Brachtbecke's family crest were later also included in the crest of the city of Gladbeck.

In 1438, the Herzog of Cleves granted the von Oeffte family enfeoffment of 50 percent of Wittringen. The family later acquired the other half and was thus the castle's sole possessor for the next 150 years. In the mid-sixteenth century, Wittringen was given to the family of the Knights von Capellen as a betrothal gift. During the Thirty Years' War, it was plundered by Hessian troops in 1642.

In 1922, Freiherr Vittinghoff-Schell, then the owner of Wittringen, sold the castle to the city of Gladbeck. In the following years, it was extensively overhauled, using historic maps and plans. The manor house was re-modelled in its original style of the Dutch Renaissance. Since 1928, Wittringen has been home to the museum of Gladbeck (Museum der Stadt Gladbeck) and today it also hosts a restaurant. The castle is surrounded by spacious forests, parks and the Gladbeck Stadium.
