= Final Solution (disambiguation) =

The Final Solution, short for "Final Solution to the Jewish Question", was the Nazi plan to commit genocide on Jews and culminated in the Holocaust.

Final Solution(s) or The Final Solution may also refer to:

== Film ==
- Final Solution (2001 film), a South African drama
- Final Solution (2004 film), an Indian documentary about the 2002 Gujarat Riots

== Literature ==
- The Final Solution (novel), a 2004 novel by Michael Chabon
- The Final Solution, a 1953 book by Gerald Reitlinger
- Final Solution: The Fate of the Jews 1933–1949, a 2016 book by David Cesarani
- Final Solutions, a 1993 play by Mahesh Dattani

== Music ==
- The Final Solution (American band), a 1960s garage rock band
- The Final Solution, a 1970s band that recorded the soundtrack album Brotherman
- "Final Solution", a song by Black Label Society from The Blessed Hellride
- "Final Solution", a 1976 single by Pere Ubu
- "Final Solution", a song by Rocket from the Tombs
- "The Final Solution", a song by Sabaton from Coat of Arms

== Other uses ==
- Final Solution (professional wrestler), a ring name of Robert "Jeep" Swenson
- Final Solution of the Czech Question, a Nazi Germany plan for a complete Germanization of Czech Lands
- Final Solution of the German Question, a post-war expulsion of Germans from Czechoslovakia, Final Solution was the term Czechoslovak President Edvard Beneš used to describe the deportations
- "Final solution to the Isaaq problem", a euphemism used during the Isaaq genocide in the late 1980s
- Final Solutions LLC, former name of parent company that owns the internet forum Kiwi Farms
- Term used by former Australian politician Fraser Anning

== See also ==
- Jewish question (disambiguation), the question for which the Final Solution was planned
- Ethnic cleansing, a policy of persecution of an ethnic or religious minority, through imprisonment, expulsion, or killing
- Ideal Final Result, a basic term in TRIZ, a problem solving methodology
- The Final Problem, a story by Sir Arthur Conan Doyle
