= Quarantine (2021 film) =

2021 dystopian drama film

- Directed by: Diana Ringo
- Written by: Diana Ringo
- Produced by: Diana Ringo
- Starring: Anatoliy Beliy, Aleksandr Obmanov
- Cinematography: Dmitry Strizhevsky
- Edited by: Diana Ringo
- Music by: Diana Ringo
- Production company: AElita Productions
- Release dates: 14 September 2021 (Amur Autumn Film and Theater Festival); 2 November 2021 (Amazon Prime)
- Running time: 74 minutes
- Countries: Russia, Ukraine, Finland
- Language: Russian

Quarantine (Russian: КАРАнтин, romanized: KARAntin) is a 2021 Russian-Finnish dystopian drama film written and directed by Diana Ringo. The film premiered on 14 September 2021 in Blagoveschensk, Russia. Moscow premiere was held on 4 October at KARO Oktyabr. The film is an official non-English language Golden Globes 2022 entry (Russia, Finland).

== Plot ==
In the near-future, the protagonist of the film, Felix, has not left his house for more than 20 years, since the whole world was placed under quarantine. After the quarantine was announced, a global catastrophe happened. Felix was one of the few who managed to hide underground, in a bunker, and survive. He is completely alone, without any means of communication. His only companions are the ghosts of the people he once knew. Felix is haunted by the idea that he could have stopped the disaster, since he had the opportunity to tell the truth to the world.

Felix recalls conversations with Kirill, his former friend, who said that during a crisis it is only possible to survive if one remains silent and does not interfere with the ongoing events. Felix's female friend on the other hand was convinced that it is possible to save the world and that Felix must disclose the secret information that he is in possession of.

== Cast ==
- Anatoliy Beliy as Felix
- Aleksandr Obmanov as Kirill
- Diana Ringo as Her
- Aleksey Sharanin as radio announcer (voice)

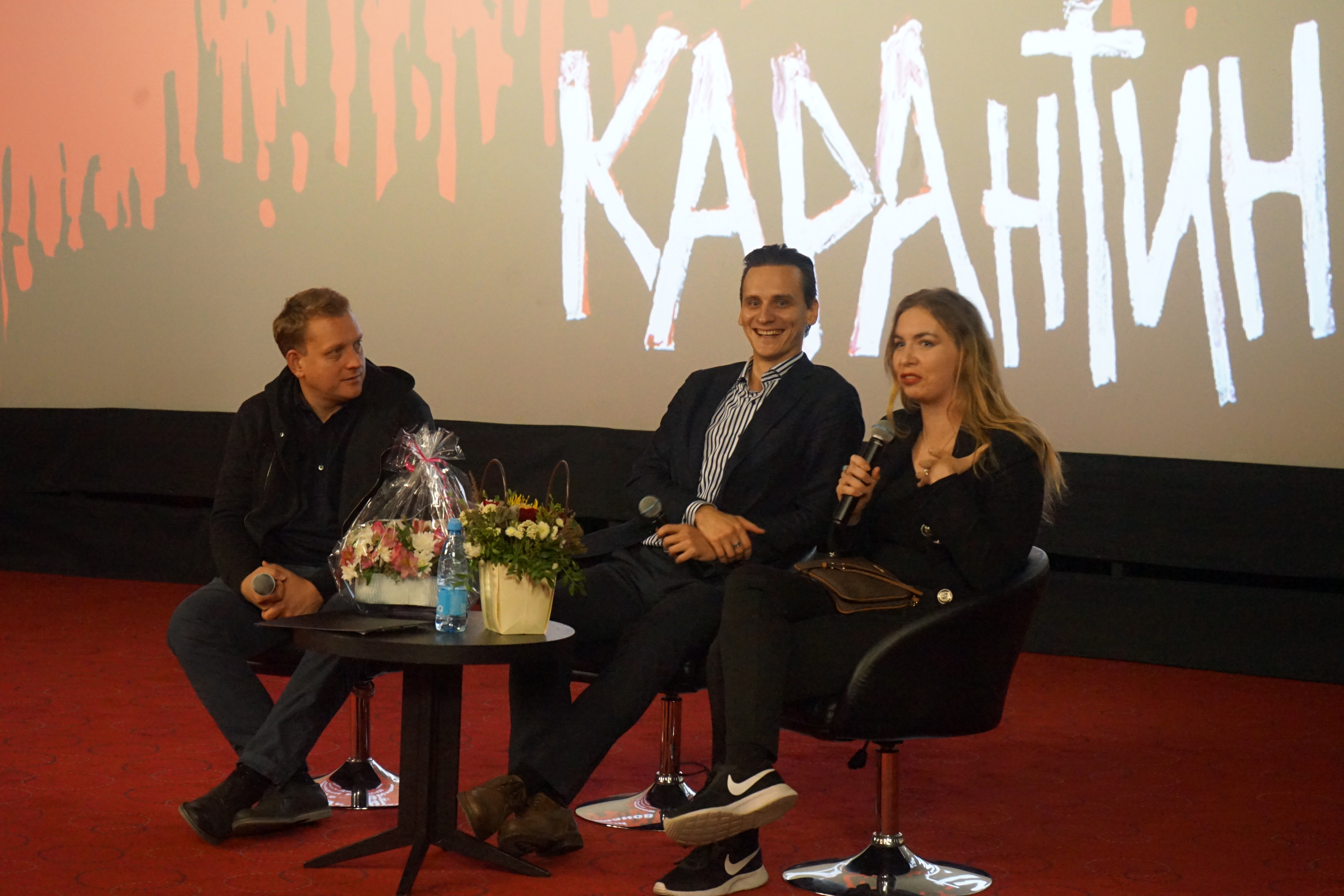
Aleksandr Obmanov and Diana Ringo at the film premiere of "Quarantine"

== Production ==
The film was shot in Russia, Ukraine, Finland and Austria. Quarantine is an independent film made without government support. The film is the directorial debut of composer Diana Ringo, who wrote the soundtrack and script for the film. She wrote the screenplay during the COVID-19 lockdown in Vienna, Austria. Merited Artist of the Russian Federation Anatoly Bely starred in the main role of the protagonist Felix in the film. For actor Aleksandr Obmanov, it was his first starring role in a feature film.

== Music ==
Besides directing, Diana Ringo has an extensive background as a pianist and composer. Quarantine soundtrack consists of classical style compositions combined with modern sounds of synthesizers which mirror the bleak and tormented inner world of the protagonist as envisioned by Diana Ringo. The original motion picture soundtrack was written by Diana Ringo using her keyboard and Logic Pro X with various VST plugins by Native Instruments.

The film's soundtrack consisting of 26 tracks covering a duration of 1:02:58 was made available on YouTube on 22 February 2021. In 2022 the soundtrack has been released on Bandcamp. In the film some of the music is shortened, while the released soundtrack album contains music in full-length, as originally recorded.

Piano Fantasia No. 1 from the film's soundtrack was featured on the Cinematic Sountracks program on BBC Radio 3 on 30 June 2025.

== Release ==
World premiere of the film was held on 14 September 2021 at the Amur Autumn Film and Theater Festival in Blagoveschensk, Russia. Moscow premiere was held on 4 October at the KARO Oktyabr cinema center.

The film was also screened in 2021 in Vienna, Austria, and Prague, Czechia.

In 2022 the film was selected for the main program of the 5th Ravno Selo Film Festival in Serbia. Founder of the festival is Lazar Ristovski.

Quarantine was released on digital streaming by Prime Video on November 2, 2021. In 2022 the film has also been released on the FilmDoo platform.

=== Reception ===
Quarantine was positively reviewed by WorldFilmGeek. He described it as a visually stunning and harrowing journey, highlighted Anatoliy Beliy's fantastic performance, commended Ringo's multifaceted talent, and praised the haunting score. Non-linear narrative of the film has been compared to the works of Andrei Tarkovsky, Terrence Malick and Aleksandr Sokurov.

=== Awards ===
Quarantine won the Best Visual Effects or Design award at the 2021 edition of ES Europe International Film Festival.
