= Gladbeck hostage crisis =

1988 event in West Germany

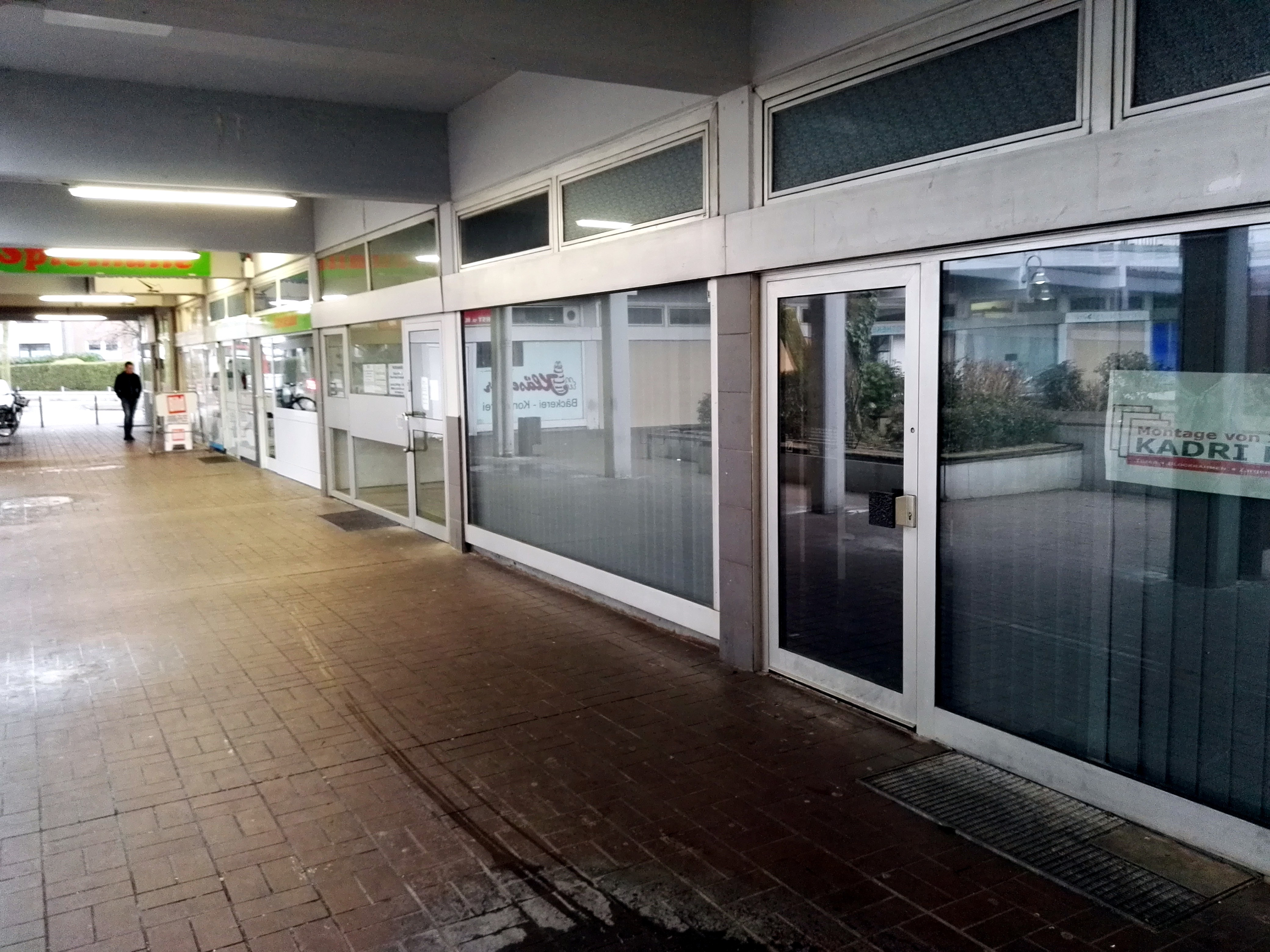
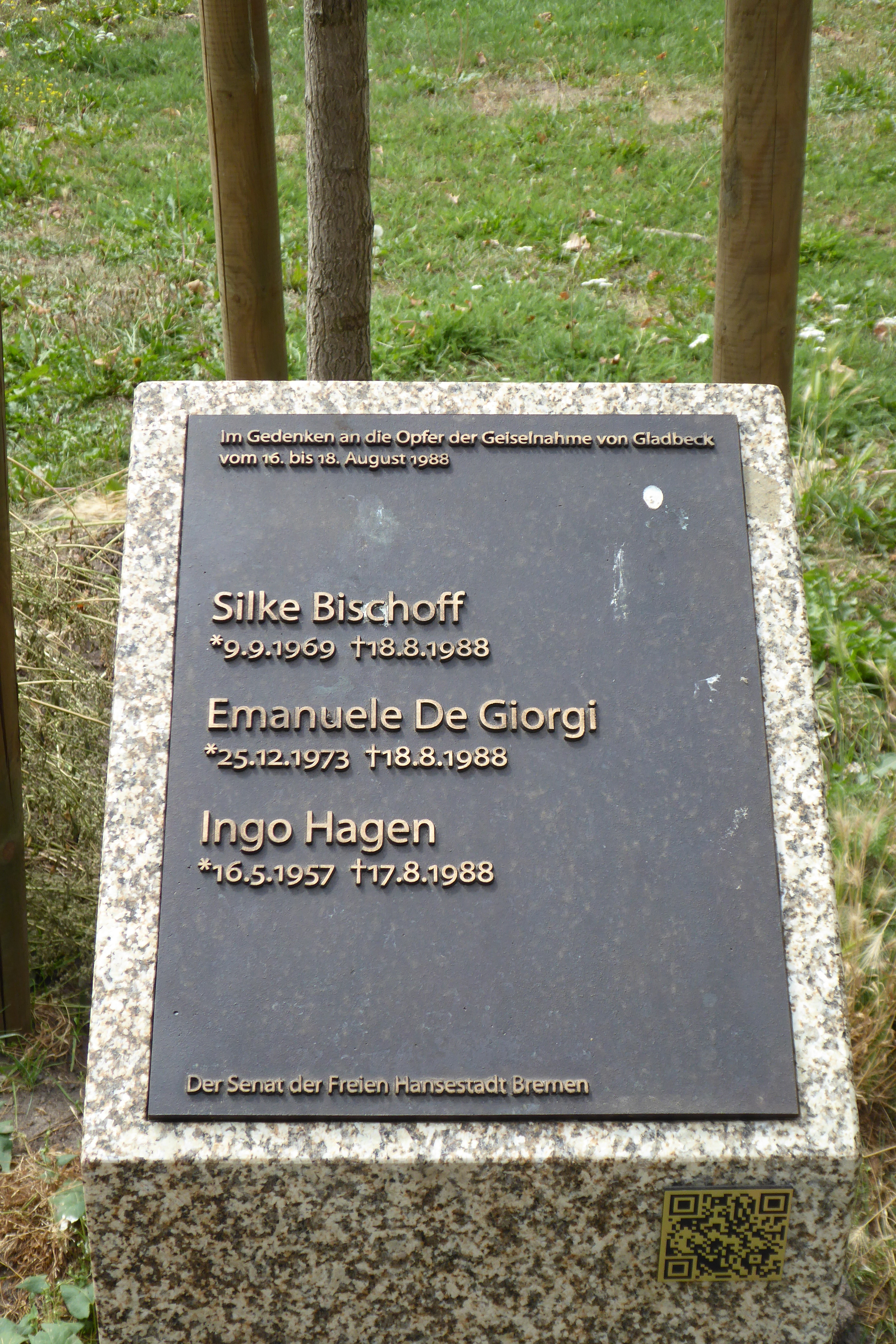
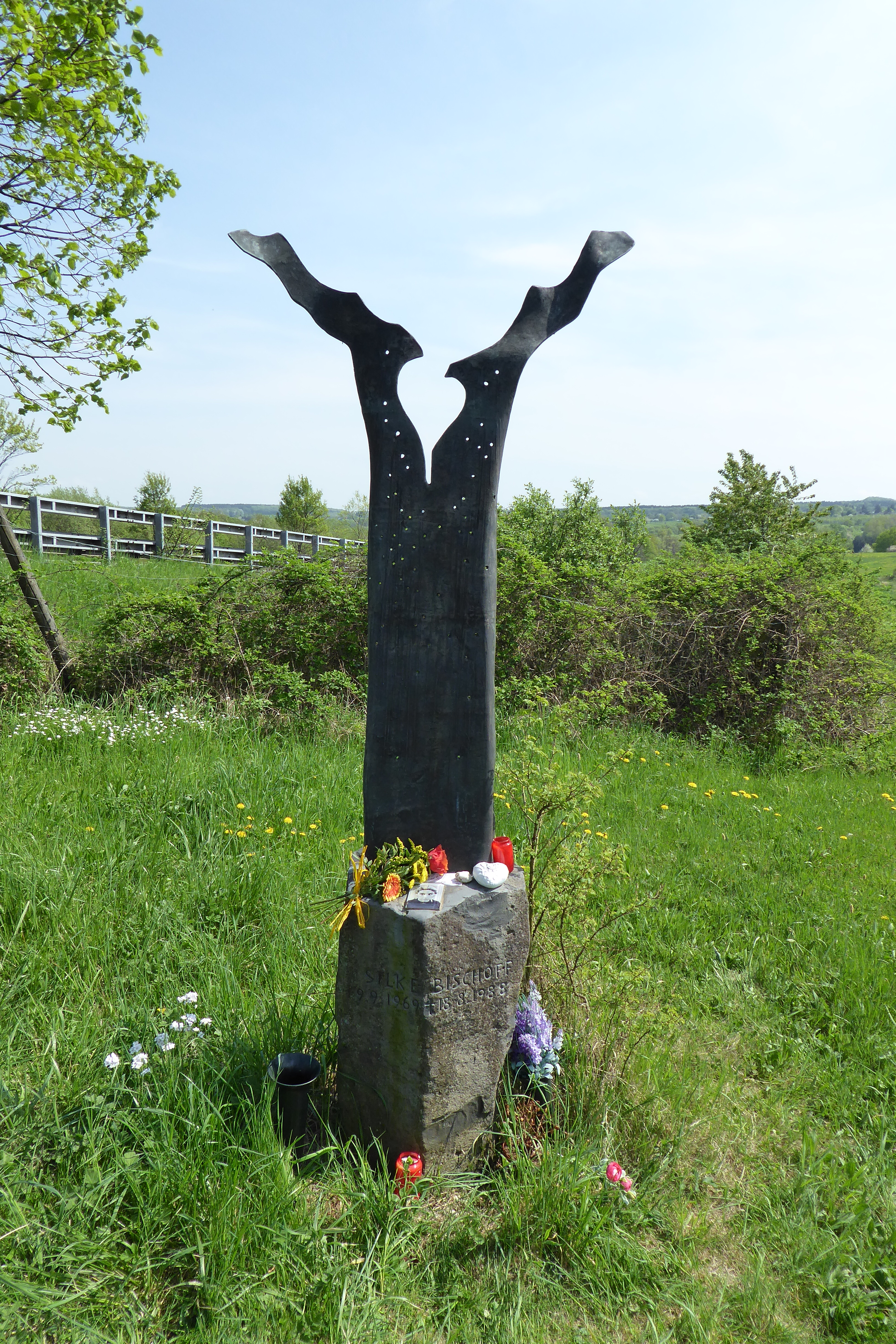
- From top down, left to right: Former Deutsche Bank branch in Gladbeck-Rentfort; Commemorative plaque at the Huckelriede bus stop in Bremen; Memorial for Silke Bischoff in Aegidienberg
- Location: Various places in North Rhine-Westphalia, Lower Saxony and Bremen, West Germany; Oldenzaal, Netherlands
- Date: 16–18 August 1988
- Attack type: Bank robbery, hostage-taking
- Weapons: 9mm Colt Government Model 1911A1 (Rösner); .357 Magnum Smith & Wesson Model 28 (Degowski); 9mm SIG Sauer P225 (Löblich)
- Deaths: 3
- Injuries: At least 7 (including the three perpetrators)
- Perpetrators: Hans-Jürgen Rösner; Dieter Degowski; Marion Löblich

Route taken by the hostage-takers: 1. 16 August, 07:55 – Bank robbery in Gladbeck-Rentfort. 16 August, 21:37 – Rösner and Degowski leave the bank with two hostages and are later joined by Löblich.; 2. 17 August, 19:11 – Bus hijacking in Bremen.; 3. 17 August, 23:07 – Degowski shoots Emanuele De Giorgi in the head.; 4. 18 August, 06:32 – Switch to getaway car with Silke Bischoff and Ines Voitle as hostages.; 5. 18 August, 10:53 – Stop in the city centre of Cologne.; 6. 18 August, 13:40 – The police ends the hostage-taking. Silke Bischoff is fatally shot.

The Gladbeck hostage crisis or Gladbeck hostage drama was a bank robbery and hostage-taking that took place in northwestern West Germany from 16 to 18 August 1988. Two men with prior criminal records – Hans-Jürgen Rösner and Dieter Degowski – robbed a branch of the Deutsche Bank in Gladbeck, North Rhine-Westphalia, taking two employees as hostages. During their flight, they were joined by Rösner's girlfriend Marion Löblich, with whom they hijacked a public transport bus in Bremen. With twenty-seven hostages aboard, they drove towards the Netherlands, where all but two hostages were released, and the bus was exchanged for a getaway car. The hostage-taking was finally ended when the police rammed the getaway car on the A3 motorway near Bad Honnef, North Rhine-Westphalia.

During the hostage crisis, a 14-year-old boy and an 18-year-old woman were killed. A third victim, a 31-year-old police officer, died in a traffic collision while chasing the hostage-takers. At the time, the unfolding of events was extensively covered by West German media, which quickly spiraled into a media circus. In the aftermath of the hostage crisis, journalists were criticised for conducting interviews with the hostage-takers, asking them to pose for photographs, and aiding them by giving them, among other things, coffee and road directions. This resulted in the German Press Council banning any future interviews with hostage-takers during hostage situations.

== Perpetrators ==
=== Hans-Jürgen Rösner ===
Hans-Jürgen "Hanusch" Rösner was born on 17 February 1957 in Gladbeck. He grew up in a family with three older sisters and one younger sister. His father, who was a World War II veteran, was often violent and physically abused him throughout his childhood. At the age of 8 or 9, an acquaintance of his father's reportedly taught him to shoplift. Rösner was a bedwetter until age 10 and had a pronounced stutter during his school years. His first conviction for theft was at the age of 14.

By his late 20s, Rösner had already committed numerous thefts and burglaries, and had spent a total of eleven years in prison. In August 1986, he disappeared while on furlough and went into hiding at his sister's house. One year later, he moved in with his girlfriend, Marion Löblich, and her teenaged daughter Nicole, in an apartment in the neighborhood of Rentfort-Nord. The police, having been tipped by Rösner's ex-wife Ursula regarding his whereabouts, planned to arrest him on 16 August 1988 – the day of the bank robbery and hostage-taking.

=== Dieter Degowski ===
Dieter Degowski was born on 4 June 1956 in Gladbeck; he was the fifth child in a family of six children. Like Rösner, he experienced domestic abuse as a child, causing him to develop a violent and anti-social character. The two met while attending a primary school for special education. In his early teens, he regularly committed minor crimes, such as shoplifting, and was first arrested at the age of 15 for stealing sedative drugs. He later started stealing cars, and developed an alcohol and Vesparax addiction.

In 1983, Rösner and Degowski crossed paths again when they shared a cell in Werl Prison for eight months. Shortly before the bank robbery in August 1988, Degowski agreed to be Rösner's accomplice on the premise that they would use the money to establish their own car recycling business near Münster. Degowski's IQ was assessed at 79.

=== Marion Löblich ===
Marion Irma Löblich (née Müller) was born on 14 April 1954 in Bremen; she was the second of eight children. During her childhood, her parents often coped with financial problems. In her late teens, she became pregnant with her first child and married the father. Some time after the birth of her daughter Leila, who is intellectually disabled, she caught her husband cheating with her best friend. She applied for a divorce in 1975, while pregnant with her second daughter, Nicole.

One year later, she married her second husband in Duisburg; they moved to Gladbeck and opened a bar. There, she met Ralf Löblich and divorced her husband in 1978 to marry a third time. In 1980, she gave birth to a son, named Pierre. The couple worked as taxi drivers for some time, but unsatisfied with her marriage, Löblich eventually left her husband to start a relationship with Hans-Jürgen Rösner.

== Timeline ==
=== 16 August 1988 ===
At 7:55 am, Degowski and Rösner broke into a branch of the Deutsche Bank in the district of Rentfort-Nord in Gladbeck before opening hours. The men were hooded and armed with a M1911 and a Smith & Wesson Model 27, respectively, and also carried a backup Luger pistol and 350 rounds of assorted .357, 9 mm and .45 ACP type ammunition in a plastic bag. At gunpoint, the employees gave the robbers 120,000 DM.

At 8:04 am, an emergency call was made to the police by a witness. A parked police car was seen by the offenders as they left the branch. They went back into the bank and took two clerks hostage, demanding a car and ransom money, firing their guns into the air several times.

Journalist Hans Meiser, then working for a RTL radio station, called the bank to interview the robbers, becoming the first member of the press to conduct an interview with them as the hostage crisis was happening. Negotiations were held over the next hours through Gladbeck branch bank director Wolfgang H. Schöning. The abductors were given 300,000 DM and a white Audi 100 as a getaway car by an unarmed police officer in his underwear. The vehicle had been equipped with tracking and listening devices, with which police intended to track them.

At 9:45 pm, the getaway started. The robbers took two bank employees with them as hostages. Police operated under the assumption that the robbers would release their hostages within the next hours before fleeing on their own, so the monitoring was lax and no rescue operation was planned ahead of time. Dieter Höhbusch, the officer in charge during the initial bank robbery stand-off, later recalled that he was convinced that the hostage crisis would be resolved "by the time I woke up the next morning", as they thought Rösner would be easily found in a statewide manhunt due to his numerous tattoos and "unimaginative mindset".

The robbers remained in town for several more hours, driving around aimlessly and stocking up on food and alcohol at local restaurants, paying while brandishing their guns. As Rösner correctly suspected that the car was rigged, he began to look around for another vehicle. Rösner first entered a pub and demanded the keys to a parked car outside at gunpoint, but left after no one admitted to being the owner. At a gas station, Rösner mugged a policeman, stealing his sidearm and radio. The pair successively stole two other cars, but abandoned them due to fears that they were police decoys, before settling on a final vehicle, which had in fact been planted by police and was also bugged. Before leaving Gladbeck, the group picked up Marion Löblich, the girlfriend of Hans-Jürgen Rösner, which initially went unnoticed by authorities. Via the A1 and A30 highways, they first drove north through Münster to Osnabrück, where they turned back south at Bad Oeyenhausen, passing through Bielefeld and Dortmund over A2 before ending up in Hagen. The robbers made frequent stops at rest areas and roadside cafés in company of the hostages.

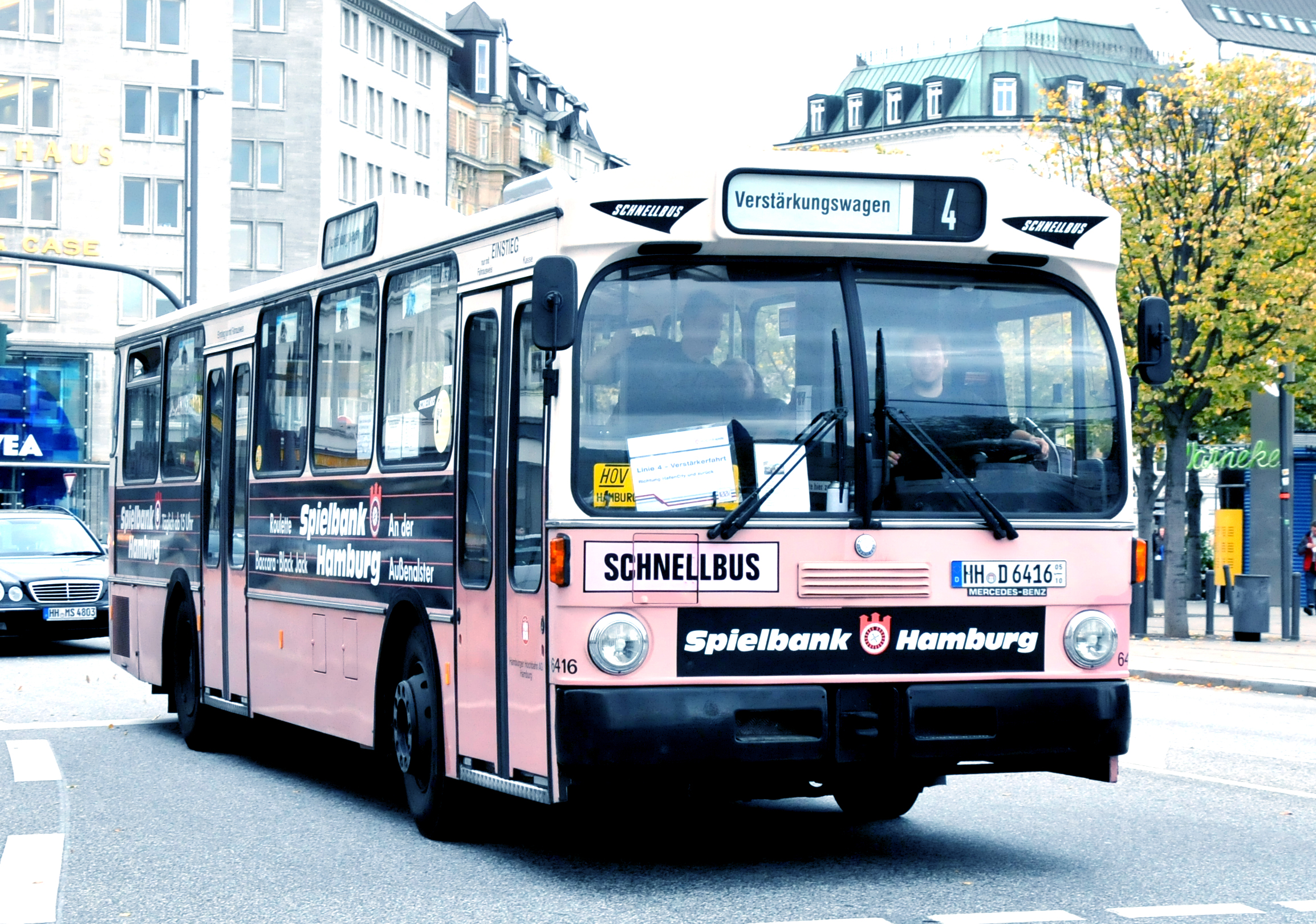

Above: a Mercedes-Benz O305 similar to the one that was hijacked. Below: livery of the hijacked BSAG bus.

=== 17 August ===
In the early hours of 17 August, after driving back north on the autobahn from Hagen to Bremen, the abductors arrived in the district of Vegesack. Rösner and Löblich left the car to visit the latter's family and shop in a commercial area while Degowski watched the hostages. By this point, Bremen Police had been notified of the abductors' presence, located their vehicle and kept it under close watch. As the trio believed that police had lost their trail, they were no longer vigilant and at one point, Degowski left the occupied car unattended for several minutes to urinate. Neither the observing police 250 meters away or the hostages themselves made any attempt to vacate the area. By the time Rösner, Degowski and Löblich continued their drive through Bremen, North Rhine-Westphalia Police arrived, but had difficulty following the location of the abductors' vehicle fed by local police as they were unfamiliar with the streets.

During the day, knowledge about the Gladbeck robbers' presence in Bremen spread to the public, with camera crews managing to track down the movement of the kidnappers, capturing footage of them at various stops as they discussed their next steps. The previous day, Friedhelm Meise of Recklinghausen Police had implored the press to not actively cover the ongoing hostage crisis until "the release of the hostages/arrest of the hostage takers" as to not risk the lives of those involved. Rösner and Degowski repeatedly called police to re-open negotiations, but no one at the station was willing to pick up the phone. Attempts by Rösner to have bank director Schöning act as a proxy once more again failed due to a lack of police response.

By midday, the kidnappers had stopped in the district of Huckelriede, where they parked their car at a vegetable market to again have a hostage call police. When the hostage complained that the dispatcher was refusing to talk with the hostage takers and remarked that police were likely watching them at the same moment, Rösner and Degowski became agitated. The men drew their guns, pointed them at the two hostages and walked to a nearby bus stop. Unlike in Gladbeck, where the buildings near the bank had been almost immediately evacuated after police arrival, traffic was entirely uninhibited despite Bremen Police knowing about the armed kidnappers. Only the trams had ceased operations, which only led to an increase in bus usage as substitute. At 7:00 pm, Rösner and Degowski hijacked a public-transit bus (Line 53) with 32 people inside, including five children. Bus driver Wolfgang Schweickart tried to drive off upon seeing the armed men approach, but he instinctively braked upon seeing the red light ahead. There were too few officers without adequate equipment to properly cordon off the scene so the media were able to get close and even into the bus interior with the permission of the abductors.

The abductors as well as the hostages were interviewed without any interference from the police, and photographers took pictures of both the robbers and passengers. Marksmen were placed in neighboring buildings while plainclothed MEK (Mobile Einsatzkommandos) was allowed on the bus without the abductors' knowledge, but police specifically ordered that no action was to be undertaken, claiming that the department lacked the training and resources to handle the situation. Uniformed officers kept their distance while passersby occasionally walked up to the open bus doors and freely talked to those inside the bus. Some hostages even had a pistol pressed against their throats. Five elderly hostages were released by the hostage takers' own accord, with no officers in the area to take them in. Police did not send in a negotiator, a role that was instead served by press photographer Peter Meyer, who relayed to on-site TV crews the demands of the kidnappers for another getaway car, more handcuffs, and a restrained police officer in exchange for the hostages. Rösner felt comfortable enough around the press to sometimes leave the bus with Degowski and Löblich, who had armed herself with the leftover Luger, to be interviewed outside by journalists. During interviews, Rösner frequently demanded direct police contact, reiterated his demands, and openly talked about his willingness to kill the hostages, at one point putting the pistol in his mouth to underline his readiness to commit suicide afterwards. Rösner ended up using a reporter's car phone to communicate with police, who continued to refuse contact. Rösner had left his pistol on his lap during the calls, with reporter Rainer Fromm recalling that everyone was close enough to grab it. In the evening hours, in response to spotting a figure in a building opposite of the bus, Rösner shouted for police to leave the premises and put his gun to the head of 9-year-old Tatiana De Giorgi in view of TV cameras as a threat while also crouching behind her to avoid being targeted by police snipers.

The bus was driven out of Bremen. Both state police and the media, in private cars and taxis, followed behind the bus. Rösner fired on a taxi occupied by journalist Manfred Protze, as it was closing in on the driver's side, leading Rösner to falsely believe that it was being used by a police officer, but the shots missed. The bus made several stops for the next 35 kilometers, until it came to the autobahn service area of Grundbergsee near Sottrum. The two bank clerks were released there. Degowski stepped out for a TV interview while holding Silke Bischoff hostage with his gun under her chin.

At the rest stop, two Bremen MEK officers arrested Löblich, who was using the toilet, without authorization by upper command. Demanding an exchange, at 11:02 pm, Degowski and Rösner threatened to kill a hostage every five minutes. Bus driver Paul Mikolajczak, who was sent to replace his colleague Schweickart, and de facto negotiator Peter Meyer convinced the officers to return Löblich, who had been brought to the other end of the rest area, but she arrived too late because of a broken handcuff key and the arresting officer turning off his radio. After the expiration of the ultimatum Degowski shot 14-year-old Emanuele De Giorgi in the head. De Giorgi had been travelling on the bus with his parents, guest workers from Surbo, Apulia, and was said to be protecting his sister, who Degowski was about to grab in place of him. Löblich re-entered the bus 20 seconds after the fatal shot. Paramedics from Rotenburg only arrived 20 minutes later when patrons of the adjacent convenience store called emergency services, as police had neglected to have an ambulance on site. As officers and civilian bystanders dragged De Giorgi indoors to provide first aid, reporters photographed the bleeding boy. He died two hours later in hospital.

At around 11:45 pm, the bus was driven towards Oldenzaal in the Netherlands. Rösner had decided on this detour on a whim after being told that "police were friendlier" there. Passengers were now required by the hostage takers to stand around the windows as human shields. During the chase a police car collided with a truck, leaving 31-year-old police officer Ingo Hagen dead and another injured.

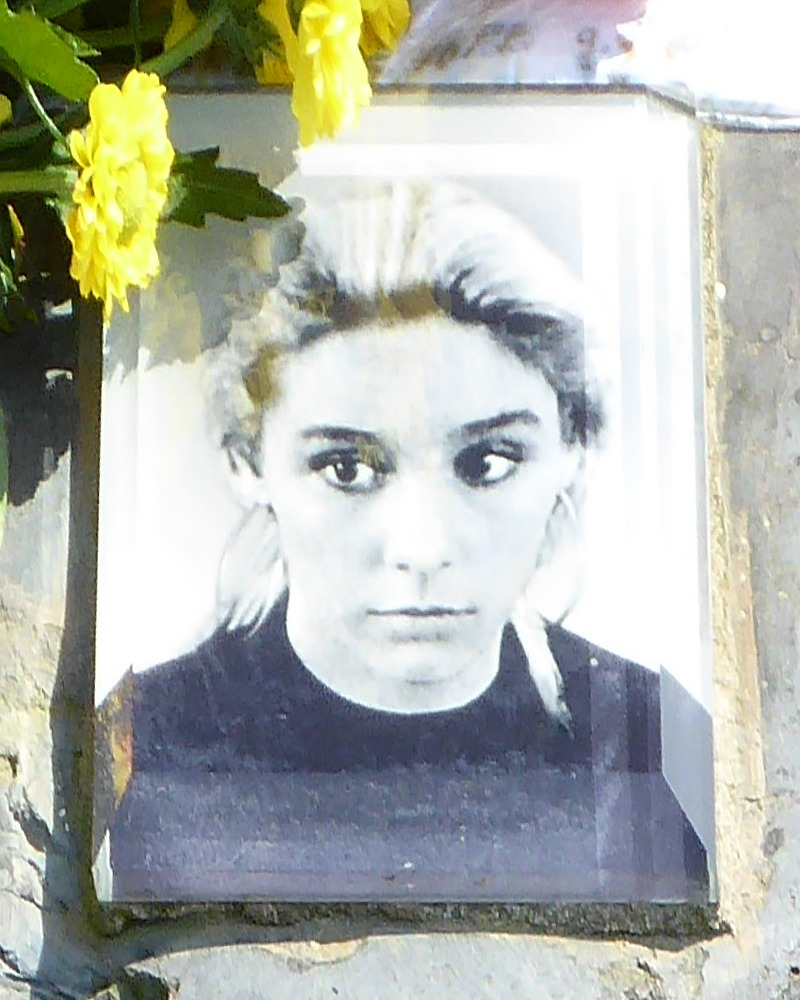
Silke Bischoff, one of the three victims

=== 18 August ===
At 2:28 am on 18 August 1988, the bus crossed the border into the Netherlands. Most press vehicles were stopped at the border by armed Dutch police. At 5:15 am, the women and children were released after the Dutch police refused to negotiate as long as children were being held hostage. Rösner accidentally fired a shot that hit Löblich in the thigh and the bus driver in the hand. Dutch officers opened fire on the bus in response, injuring no one. At 6:30 am Rösner and Degowski got a BMW 735i. The getaway car had been prepared by the police so that the engine could be stopped by remote control, which would ultimately not come into use because officers reportedly forgot to bring the remote. All remaining hostages were also released, barring two, 18-year-olds Silke Bischoff and Ines Voitle, who were chosen to remain by the hostage takers; Voitle later stated that Degowski had "gained interest" in Bischoff, early on telling her "I'm taking you with me" while still in Bremen. Police did not monitor the car and instead placed officers in two hospitals in Gronau near the highway, falsely assuming Rösner would want to have Löblich's gunshot wound treated immediately. For around 5 hours, police presence disrupted the proceedings at the hospitals, with plainclothed police dressed as doctors in the entry halls as well as heavily armed officers hiding in the bushes outside. Instead driving through Münster, Rösner headed for Cologne, reportedly to "see the cathedral".

During a stop in Wuppertal the abductors went shopping in a pharmacy, a bakery, and a photography store, where they paid with money from the bank robbery.

In Cologne, Rösner and Löblich, the former visibly armed with a handgun in his waistband, went shopping for clothes, watched by police and journalists. Patrol cars had difficulty pursuing the kidnappers due to the journalist vehicles blocking their paths. At 10:30 am, the car was surrounded by media and shoppers in a pedestrian area in Breite Straße, directly in front of the WDR Arkaden, the Cologne headquarters of Westdeutscher Rundfunk. Some reporters offered to guide the abductors on their way or to hand them pictures of police officers to prevent trickery if hostages were exchanged. There were orders to launch a rescue effort to secure the hostages, which were contradicted by regular protocol that mandated that firearm usage was not permissible due to the close proximity and abundance of civilians near the hostage takers. Against the orders of Cologne Police, a troop of plainclothed SEK officers were among the crowd planning to rescue the hostages, with team leader Rainer Kesting briefly engaging Rösner in conversation. Kesting planned to restrain Rösner as other officers positioned behind the rear window would fire on Degowski, but he relented when he remembered that his officers were required to leave their firearms in the squad car before approaching the pedestrian area. Rösner was eventually told by journalists about the plainclothed police, after which he stepped out of the car to point his gun at the crowd. Some bystanders dispersed while most of the media remained to take pictures of the abductor pointing his weapon at them. At this point, Kölner Express reporter Udo Röbel, who had interviewed Rösner a few minutes earlier after giving him coffee, shouted for people to step away from the car and make way for the group to drive off. Rösner asked for directions to the autobahn before offering to have Röbel board to act as a guide for the abductors. Röbel agreed and accompanied them for several kilometres before being dropped off at Siegburg shortly after entering A3.

On A3, still followed by both police and the media, the hostage takers told their hostages that they would be let go at dawn. At this point, police officers in pursuit received orders to "act" i.e. arrest the perpetrators, with the lives of the hostages being "a risk to accept". Near Bad Honnef, a few kilometres before the state border between North Rhine-Westphalia and Rhineland-Palatinate, a police car driven by officer Willi Rupieper rammed the getaway car at 1:40 pm and rendered it immobile. Because the abductors' car had accelerated seconds before impact, the car was not tipped to the side as intended. Degowski had lost consciousness during the crash and Löblich ducked down in the legroom of the passenger seat. Rösner, lying prone on the front seats, exchanged fire with SEK. Officers fired 62 shots on the car. Hostage Ines Voitle was struck in the back by a police ricochet, but managed to escape the car. However, Silke Bischoff was fatally shot by Rösner's gun in the heart and died. After five minutes of shooting, Rösner and Löblich surrendered by throwing their guns out the side window and were arrested shortly after.

== Aftermath ==
On 22 March, 1991, Rösner and Degowski were pronounced guilty by the regional superior court of Essen and received life sentences. Löblich was sentenced to nine years. In 2002 the Higher Court in Hamm ascertained "guilt of a very serious nature" and Degowski's sentence was increased to 24 years. In 2004 the same Higher Court refused an application for parole and a request by Rösner to shorten his sentence. As the court also declared a state of Sicherungsverwahrung (preventive detention), Rösner is unlikely to be freed after the end of his sentence.

On 20 November 1988, the Minister of the Interior of Bremen Bernd Meyer resigned over mistakes by the police.

Several years after the incident, there was a public discussion at a local police academy about the incident with the judge who had sentenced Rösner and Degowski to life in prison and journalists including Udo Röbel, a reporter who had gotten into the vehicle with the hostage-takers and gone with them, giving them directions out of Cologne. The judge praised Röbel for having prevented a potential bloodbath in Cologne by getting into the car. This was not a view expressed in the official report into the incident by a parliamentary enquiry in the state of the North Rhine Westphalia, which commented negatively on the journalists' ethics.

In August 2018 it was announced by the regional court in Arnsberg that Dieter Degowski was to be released on conditional parole after serving 30 years in prison.

=== Media conduct ===
This was the first incident in Germany with direct interference by representatives of the media. The media were severely criticised for their handling of this situation and for conducting interviews with hostages (one of the journalists acting this way was Frank Plasberg). As a result, the German Press Council (Deutscher Presserat) banned any future interviews with hostage-takers during hostage situations. The head of Germany's largest journalists' union (DJV), Michael Konken, has referred to the incident as "the darkest hour of German journalism since the end of WWII".

== Media ==
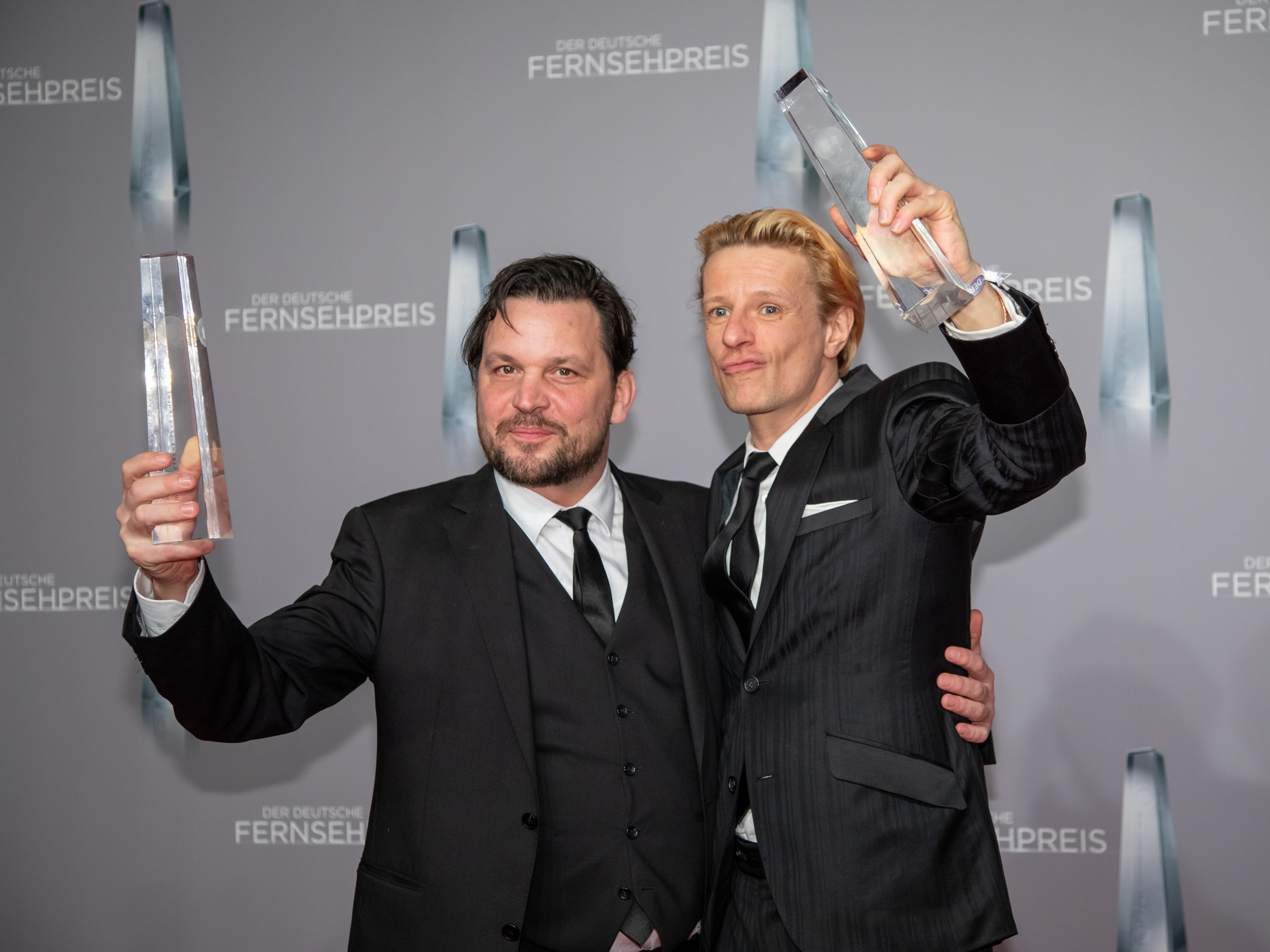
Sascha Alexander Geršak and Alexander Scheer, who portray Rösner and Degowski in the two-part dramatisation 54 Hours

A two-part dramatisation of the events, titled 54 Hours (German: Gladbeck), was broadcast by ARD in March 2018. The Australian crime podcast Casefile also covered the case in March 2021.

A documentary titled Gladbeck: The Hostage Crisis was released in 2022 on Netflix, documenting the events throughout the entire 54 hours using raw footage, without commentary.

== See also ==
- 1973 Stockholm hostage crisis
- 1975 Wijster train hijacking
- 1977 De Punt train hijacking
- 1988 Ordzhonikidze bus hijacking
