= Gladbeck =

Town in North Rhine-Westphalia, Germany

- Town
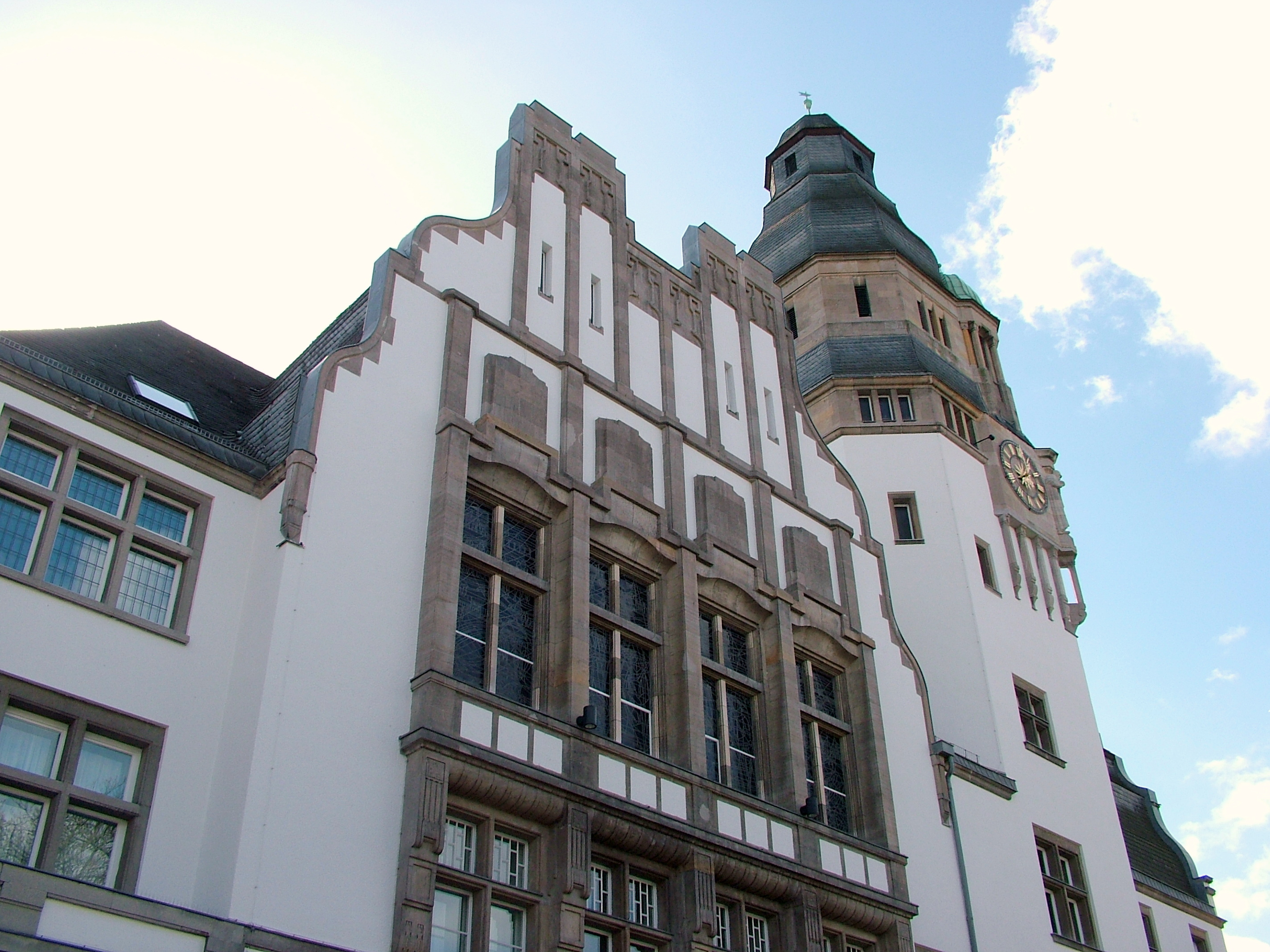
- Old town hall

- Coat of arms

- Location of Gladbeck within Recklinghausen district
- Interactive map of Gladbeck
- Location within Germany Location within North Rhine-Westphalia
- Coordinates: 51°34′N 6°58′E
- Country: Germany
- State: North Rhine-Westphalia
- Admin. region: Münster
- District: Recklinghausen

Government
  - Mayor (2025–30): Bettina Weist (SPD)
  - Governing parties: SPD/ CDU

Area
  - Total: 35.97 km^{2} (13.89 sq mi)
- Elevation: 52 m (171 ft)

Population (2025-12-31)
  - Total: 75,647
  - Density: 2,103/km^{2} (5,447/sq mi)
- Time zone: UTC+01:00 (CET)
  - Summer (DST): UTC+02:00 (CEST)
- Postal codes: 45964–45968
- Dialling codes: 02043
- Vehicle registration: RE, CAS, GLA
- Website: www.gladbeck.de

Gladbeck (German pronunciation: [ˈɡlatbɛk]) is a town in the district of Recklinghausen in North Rhine-Westphalia, Germany.

Gladbeck is quite a young town, first recognised 21 July 1919 when it was given town rights. The town established itself around five farming villages, Brauck, Butendorf, Ellinghorst, Rentfort and Zweckel.

== Geography ==
Gladbeck is located in the northern part of the Ruhr Area and belongs to the so-called Emscherzone in which mining started late in relation to other towns of this area. Gladbeck is predominantly surrounded by Bottrop, Gelsenkirchen, Dorsten and by Essen in the south.

== History ==
=== Pre-industrial society ===
Early archeological finds prove that the region of Gladbeck was already populated as early as 2000 BC. It was first mentioned in 1020 as Gladbeki and was originally a small village of 300 inhabitants. The village with its five peasantries (Butendorf, Brauck, Rentfort, Ellinghorst and Zweckel, now quarters of Gladbeck) was arranged around St. Lamberti cathedral.

From 1180 to 1802 Gladbeck belonged to the Vest Recklinghausen and was thus linked with the Electorate of Cologne. A certificate from 1236 mentions Knight Ludolfus de Wittering who is most likely to have erected Wittringen Castle around that time. Especially during the first years of the Thirty Years' War (1618–48) many cornfields in and around Gladbeck were destroyed by marauding soldiers. Additionally, the Black Death killed many inhabitants of Gladbeck during the Thirty Years' War.

At the 1815 Congress of Vienna the Kingdom of Prussia acquired the area and administered it within the Province of Westphalia. Before the Revolutions of 1848 there were three bad food crises in Gladbeck in 1816/17, 1830/31 and 1846/47. However, the "March Revolution" had no consequences on Gladbeck.

=== Time of coal mining ===
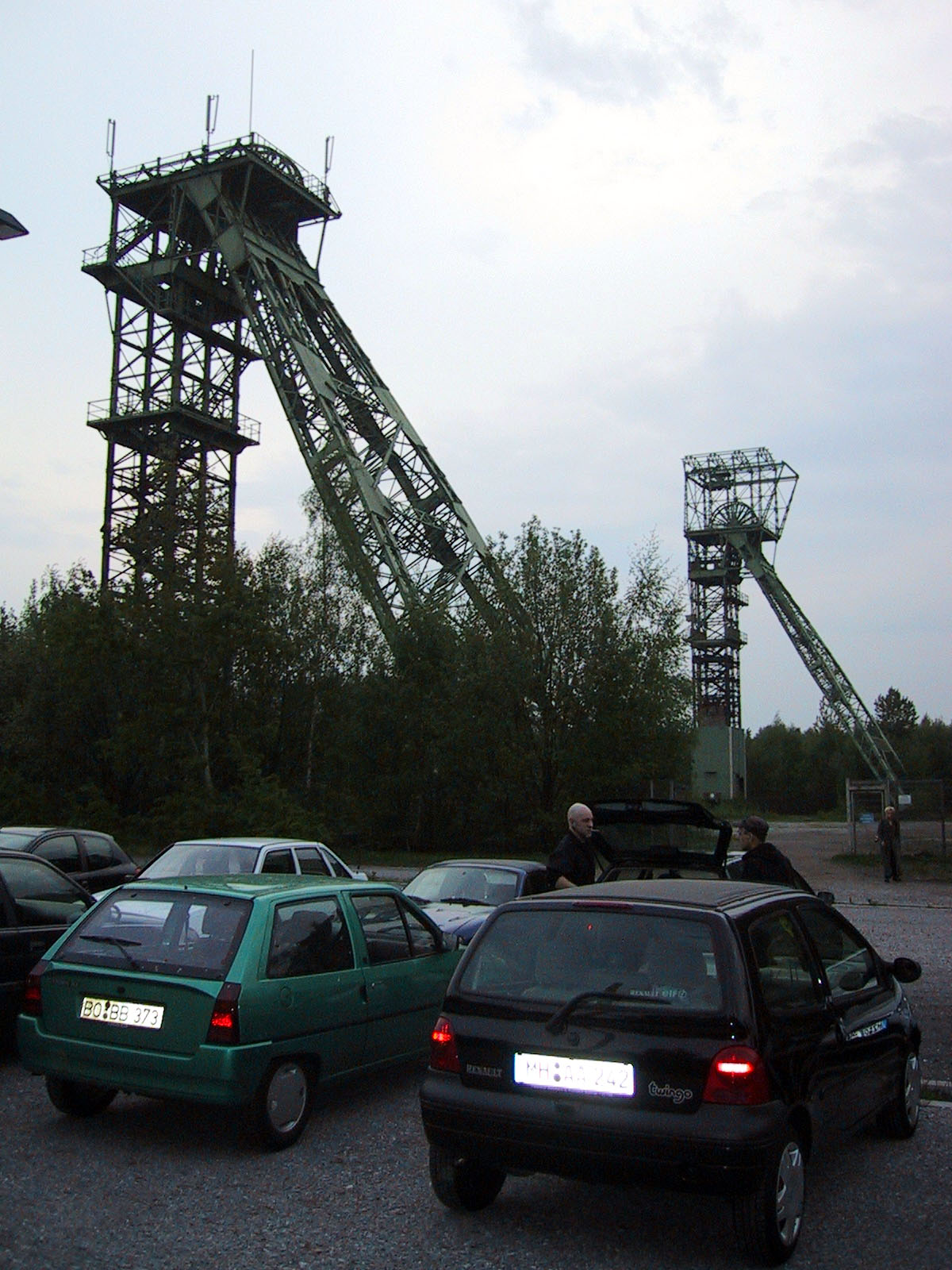
The two remaining shaft towers

Coal was found in the 1870s and the first coal was produced in 1878. Depending on additional workers, the coal mines attracted many people. Therefore, Gladbeck rapidly grew by immigration from surrounding Westphalia, the Rhine Province, and from the eastern provinces of Prussia including citizens with Polish as their native language.

The little village quickly turned into an establishment of industry and was given town privilege in July 1919. Also Gladbeck benefited from the general boom in the years 1925 to 1929 when important building projects were realised in spite of all troubles, such as the open-air bath as well as the stadium, in which Adolf Hitler delivered a speech in 1932.

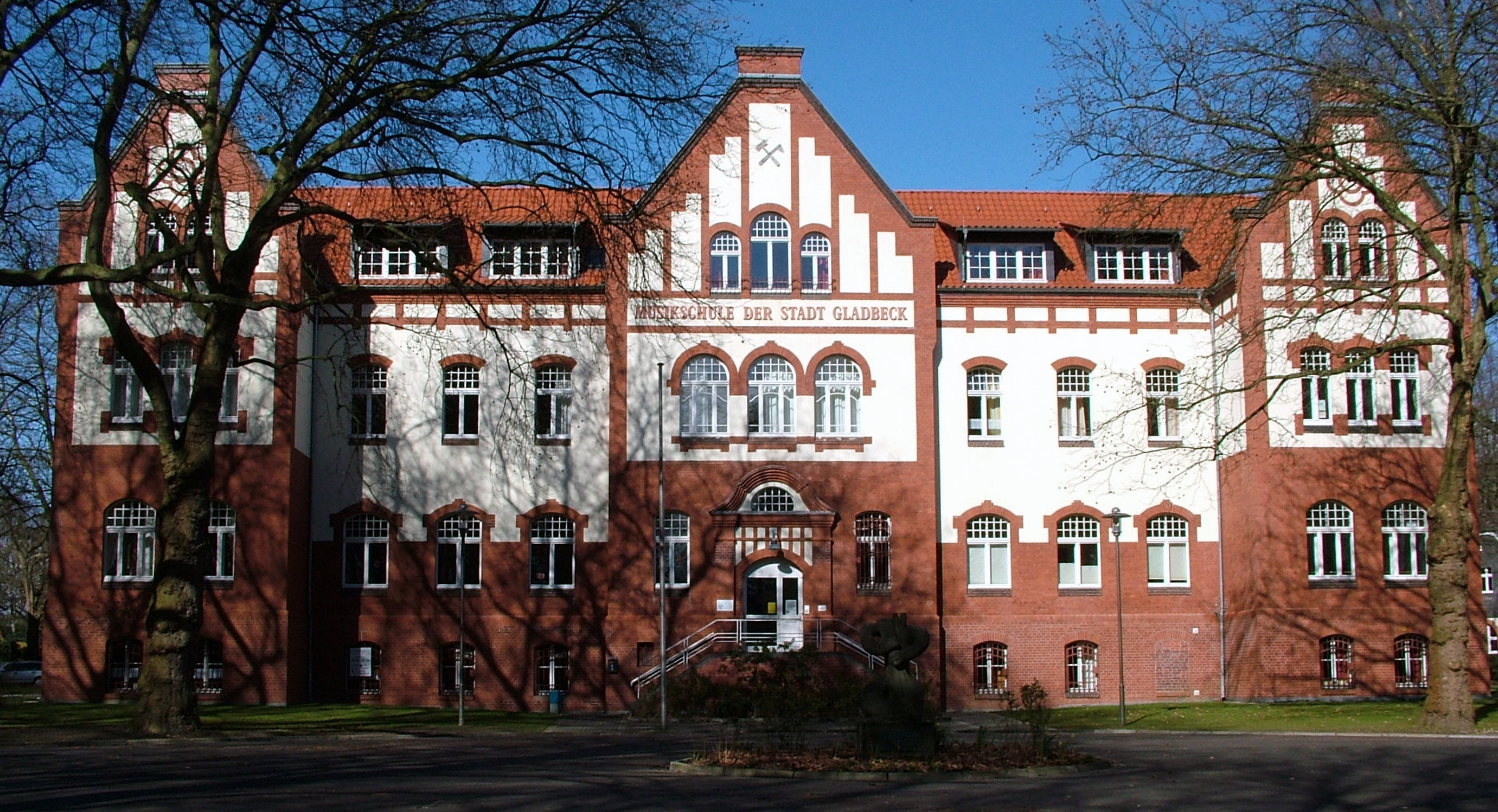
Former mining supervision (1905), now school for music

As with all German towns, Gladbeck was brought into line after Adolf Hitler was named Reichskanzler. This took place under the earlier elected conservative mayor Bernhard Hackenberg, immediately joining the Nazi Party. In World War II Gladbeck was heavily damaged and around 43% of the buildings in the center were destroyed, making it as one of the most destroyed towns in the Ruhr Area. After the war the town became part of the new state of North Rhine-Westphalia.

During the 1960s the coal industry went into a substantial crisis, resulting in widespread unemployment. Apart from this Gladbeck's population reached 85,927 inhabitants in 1969, which is unique in the history of this town. Since the last coal mine was closed in 1971 Gladbeck is fighting against a high rate of unemployment, activating the structural change.

=== Communal realignment and history since 1975 ===
In the course of the communal realignment in North Rhine-Westphalia (1975) Gladbeck, original a county borough, and the village Kirchhellen were incorporated into the neighbouring town Bottrop. Opponents of the realignment criticized the low population density at the border between Gladbeck and Bottrop and emphasized that Bottrop was not much bigger than Gladbeck. "GlaBotKi is nich" (Glabotki is not) was their catchphrase. With the help of a court decision Gladbeck successfully left Bottrop, thereby cancelling the merger. Since July 1976 Gladbeck is part of the district of Recklinghausen.

On 16 August 1988, the town received international attention when two thieves robbed a branch of the Deutsche Bank in Gladbeck. They kidnapped two bank employees and held them hostage, along with 32 people in a transport bus in Bremen and drove through West Germany and the Netherlands. In what was called the Gladbeck hostage crisis, the crisis ended in just over 2 days, with one police officer and two victims dead, and the arrest of the three individuals (Hans-Jürgen Rösner & Dieter Degowski, along with Marion Löblich for her involvement in the crime as an accomplice).

== Politics ==
The current mayor of Gladbeck is Bettina Weist of the Social Democratic Party (SPD) since 2020. The most recent mayoral election was held on 13 September 2020, with a runoff held on 27 September, and the results were as follows:

Candidate	Party	First round		Second round	
Candidate	Party	Votes	%	Votes	%
Bettina Weist	Social Democratic Party	11,452	42.6	10,728	62.8
Dietmar Drosdzol	Christian Democratic Union	6,308	23.4	6,357	37.2
Simone Steffens	Alliance 90/The Greens	2,423	9.0		
Marco Gräber	Alternative for Germany	2,110	7.8		
Markus Kellermann	Independent	1,460	5.4		
Olaf Jung	The Left	771	2.9		
Michael Tack	Free Democratic Party	686	2.6		
Habib Ay	Alternative Citizens' Initiative	608	2.3		
Ulas Polat	Independent	379	1.4		
Udo Flach	Citizens in Gladbeck	365	1.4		
Gerhard Dorka	German Communist Party	355	1.3		
Valid votes		26,917	99.3	17,085	99.0
Invalid votes		204	0.7	172	1.0
Total		27,121	100.0	17,257	100.0
Electorate/voter turnout		56,978	47.6	56,947	30.3
Source: City of Gladbeck (1st round, 2nd round)

=== List of mayors ===
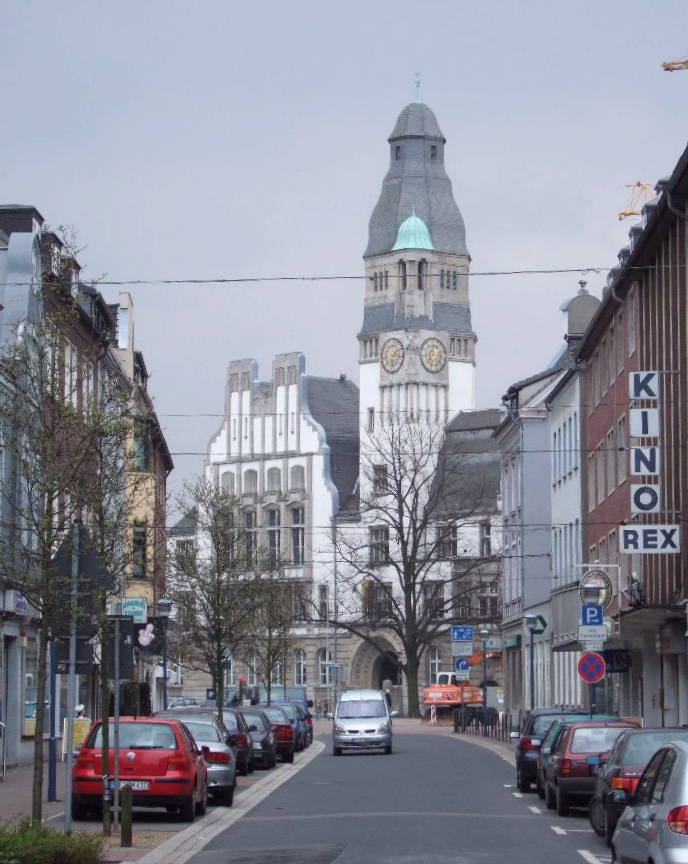
View at the historical townhall

Gladbeck possesses a mayor since it gained town privilege in July 1919. Yet, the official term was lord mayor as Gladbeck was a county borough by 1974. Since then it has a mayor and since 1994 the position as Gladbeck's mayor is a full-time function.

The mayor is the chairman of the town council and employer of administration. Gladbeck has had the following mayors:

- 1919–1931: Michael Jovy, non party
- 1931–?: Bernhard Hackenberg, joined the NSDAP in 1933
- 1948–1952: Johann Harnischfeger, CDU
- 1946–1958: Friedrich Lange, SPD
- 1958–1963: Heinrich Kliem, SPD
- 1963–1965: Hans Wuwer, SPD
- 1965–1971: Günter Kalinowski, SPD
- 1971–1974: Norbert Aust, SPD
- 1976–1994: Wolfgang Röken, SPD
- 1994–2004: Eckhard Schwerhoff, CDU
- 2004–2020: Ulrich Roland, SPD
- since 2020: Bettina Weist, SPD

In 1994 Eckhard Schwerhoff was elected mayor by the town council after the SPD had governed Gladbeck for 48 years. The SPD failed the absolute majority only barely and because the mayor has one voice too it would have led to a stalemate.

As a result, the Alliance '90/The Greens and a new founded local party (BIG) made the decision to support Eckhard Schwerhoff, a CDU party member but not involved in the politics of Gladbeck until then. In 1999 Eckhard Schwerhoff was re-elected after a reform according to which mayors should be elected directly.

In the ballot on 10 October 2004 he no longer stood for the mayor and thereupon Ulrich Roland (SPD) was elected mayor.

=== City council ===
The Gladbeck city council governs the city alongside the Mayor. The most recent city council election was held on 13 September 2020, and the results were as follows:

Party	Votes	%	+/-	Seats	+/-
Social Democratic Party (SPD)	9,783	36.5	▼10.8	19	▼3
Christian Democratic Union (CDU)	7,044	26.3	▲1.1	14	▲3
Alliance 90/The Greens (Grüne)	3,285	12.3	▲6.5	7	▲4
Alternative for Germany (AfD)	2,595	9.7	New	5	New
The Left (Die Linke)	1,121	4.2	▼1.8	2	▼1
Free Democratic Party (FDP)	899	3.4	▲0.7	2	▲1
Alternative Citizens' Initiative (ABI)	663	2.5	▲0.9	1	±0
Citizens in Gladbeck	617	2.3	▼0.3	1	±0
German Communist Party (DKP)	385	1.4	▲0.1	1	±0
Gladbeck Citizens' List	267	1.0	▼0.3	0	▼1
Independent Markus Kellermann	144	0.5	New	0	New
Independent Nilüfer Akcay	12	0.0	New	0	New
Valid votes	26,815	98.9			
Invalid votes	301	1.1			
Total	27,116	100.0		52	▲6
Electorate/voter turnout	56,978	47.6	▲0.5		
Source: City of Gladbeck

The list below gives an overview about the results of the last eight council elections:

Year	SPD	CDU	DKP (German Communist Party)	FDP	Alliance '90/The Greens	BIG (Citizens in Gladbeck)	The Left
1976	56.9	32.9	5.6	4.7			
1979	52.9	33.8	8.7	4.6			
1984	55.2	29.6	6.7		6.8		
1989	54.2	27.7	8.0	3.1	7.1		
1994	44.3	34.8	4.7		9.4	5.1	
1999	39.7	46.4			4.3	5.1	
2004	40.6	37.1	4.5	3.6	5.9	6.2	
2009	46.1	27.1	1.8	4.3	5.8	4.7	6.5
2014	47.3	25.2	1.4	2.7	5.8	2.6	6.0

=== Coat of arms ===
Gladbeck's city arms is portrayed in black, red and yellow and has a red battlement as a sign of the received municipal law from 1919. The black field and the yellow hammer as well as the yellow beater on the left side represent the coal that had a major position in Gladbeck's history. The black clasps on the right side are taken from the blazon of the Lords of Brabeck, having possessed the moated castle Wittringen at the end of the 14th century.

== Population ==
Historical population

Year	Pop.	±% p.a.
1575	1,500	—
1800	2,000	+0.13%
1900	11,704	+1.78%
1916	48,302	+9.26%
1946	59,439	+0.69%
1965	82,843	+1.76%
1970	83,132	+0.07%
1975	81,218	−0.46%
1980	79,742	−0.37%

Year	Pop.	±% p.a.
1985	76,597	−0.80%
1990	80,267	+0.94%
1995	79,605	−0.17%
2000	77,789	−0.46%
2005	76,861	−0.24%
2010	75,253	−0.42%
2015	75,455	+0.05%
2020	75,518	+0.02%
2025	75,647	+0.03%

Source: Landesdatabank Nordrhein-Westfalen (1965-2025)

== Culture and sights ==
=== Museum ===
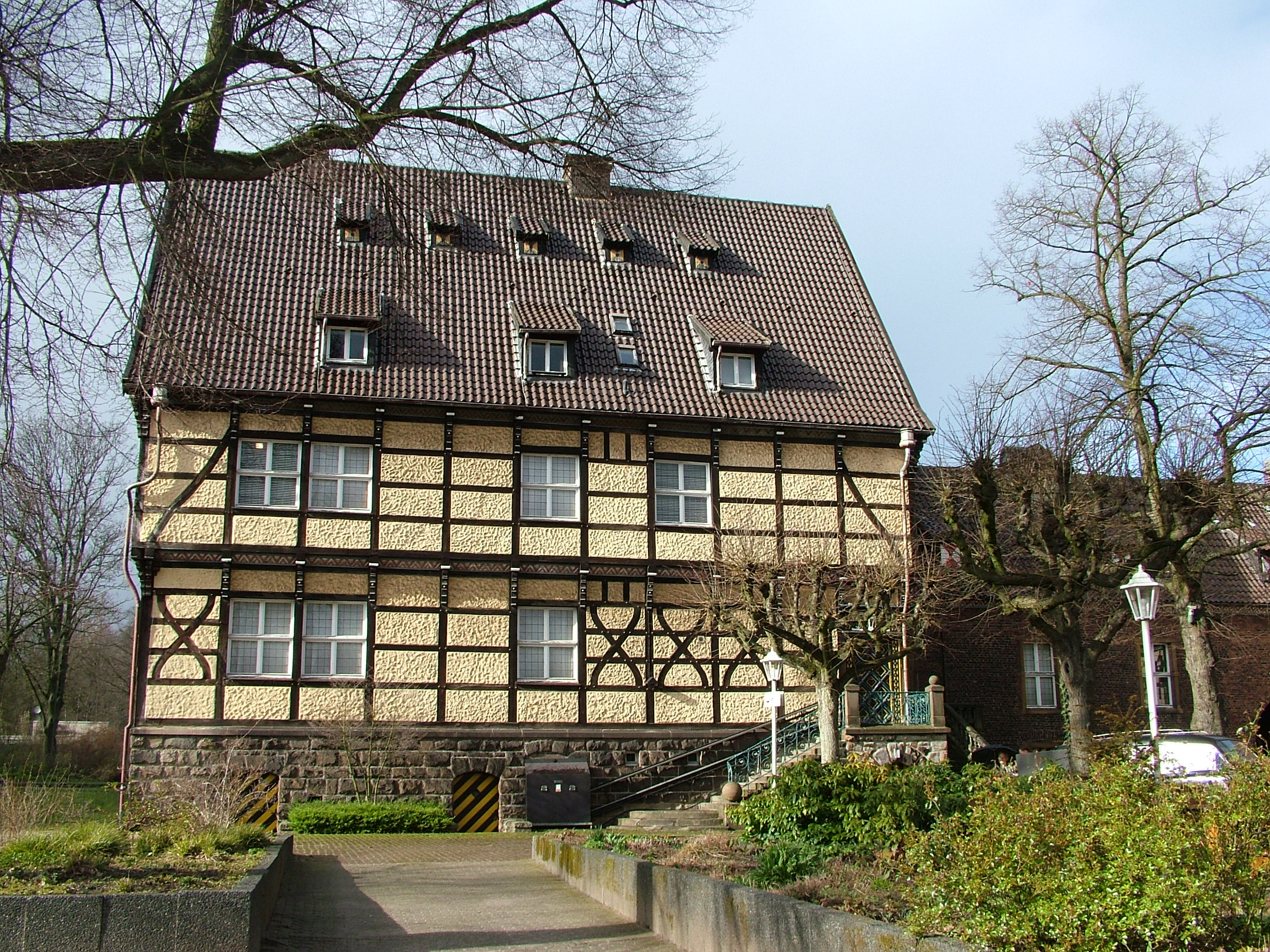
Museum

The moated castle Wittringen houses the town's museum. It contains collections and exhibitions on the history of Gladbeck. The museum shows the development of the region from the geological origins of its rich coal supplies to the first inhabitants and the present days. A major exhibit is a skeleton of a bison found in the district of Brauck. Other exhibits are:

- A coin collection and an offertory of Roman coins.
- A cemetery of the Bronze Age.
- Several rooms inform about the time of the coal mining.
- Moreover, the museum collects modern art, such as works by Joseph Beuys.

=== Religious communities ===
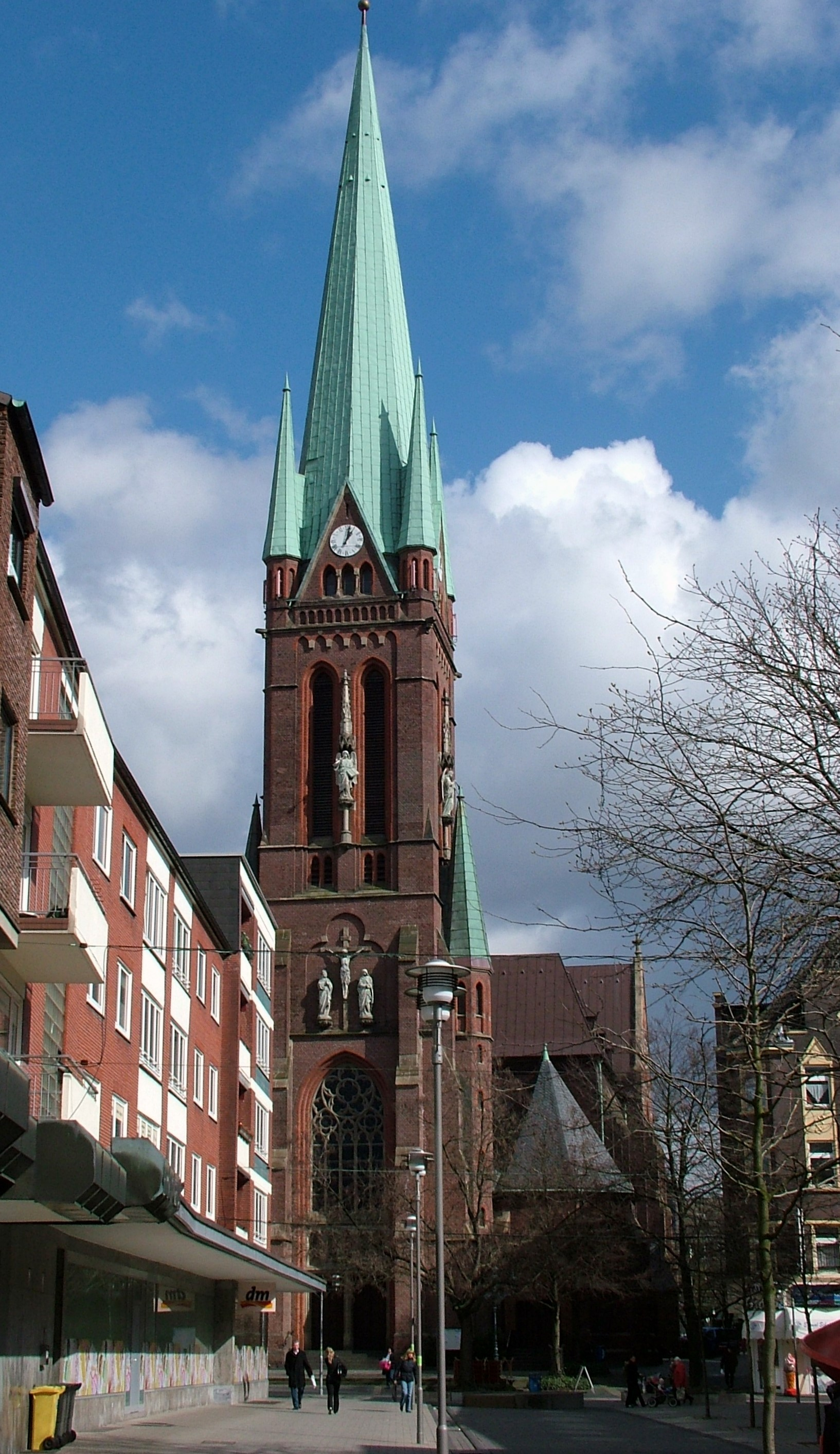
St. Lamberti, Catholic church

According to information of the town council 30,906 of 77,436 inhabitants were Catholics and 22,121 inhabitants were Protestants in December 2006. There are 11 churches, 5 are Protestant and 6 are Catholic.

In school pupils are allowed to choose between Catholic and Protestant lessons. Alternatively, pupils can be taught in Philosophy likewise if they want to. Visits to churches are included to the lessons in basic school. However, there is a Muslim minority in Gladbeck due to the immigration of the 1960s.

=== Theater and music ===
Several events, for example jazz festivals, take place regularly. There is also one library in Gladbeck and theater courses are normally offered in the three grammar schools. From time to time theater plays can be visited in the municipal hall, even well known plays like Emilia Galotti written by Gotthold Ephraim Lessing. There is one school of music where one can participate in different courses.

== Transport ==
=== Roads ===
Gladbeck is connected to the network of trunk roads through the following Autobahn:

- A 2: Oberhausen–Dortmund–Hannover–Berlin
- A 31: Bottrop–Gronau–Emden
- A 52: Marl-North–Gelsenkirchen–Gladbeck
- B 224: Raesfeld–Erle–Dorsten–Gladbeck–Essen–Velbert–Wuppertal–Solingen

=== Rail ===
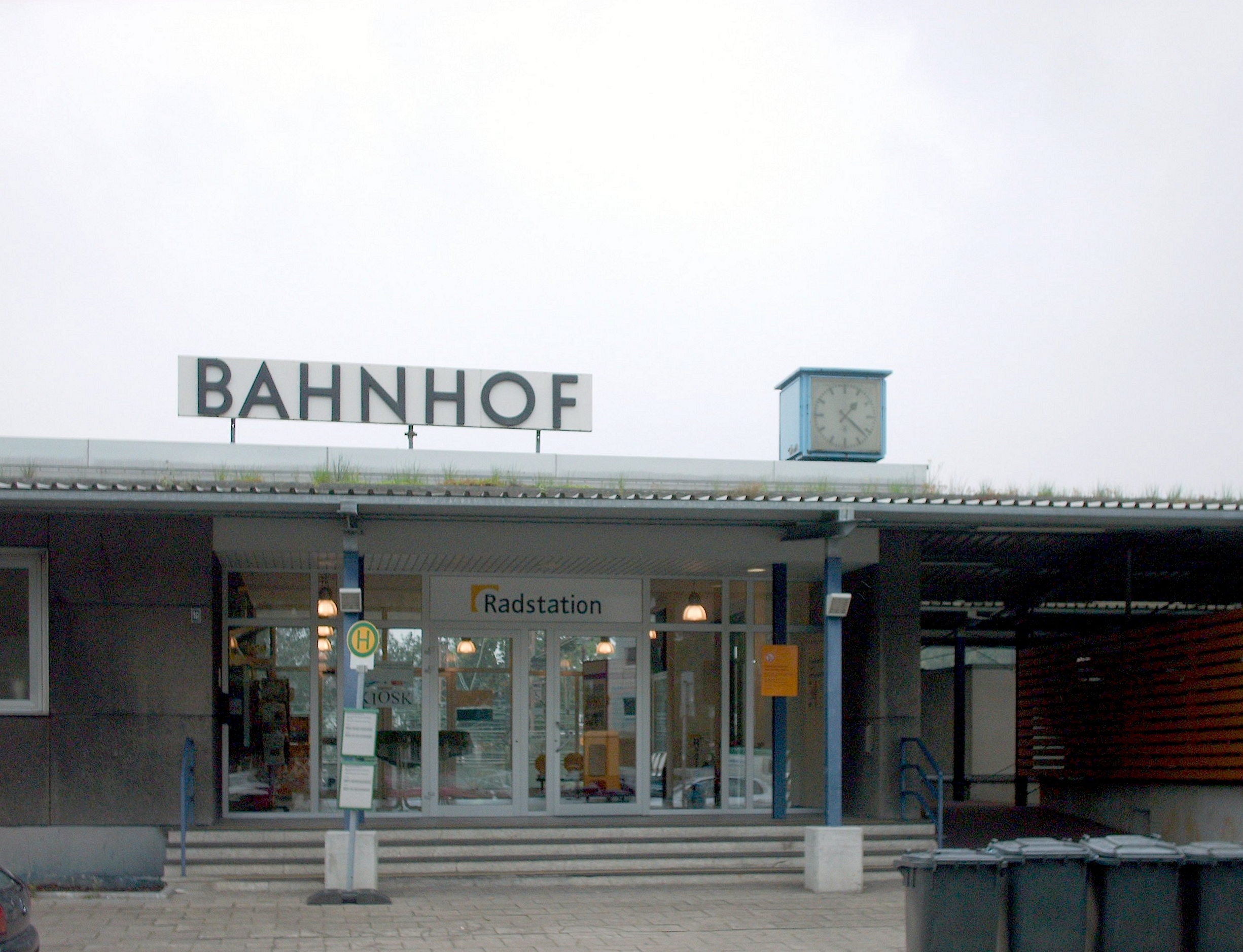
Gladbeck West station

Gladbeck has three railway stations:

- the centrally located Gladbeck West station on the Oberhausen-Osterfeld Süd–Hamm line, which includes a bike parking facility,
- Gladbeck Ost station on the Winterswijk–Gelsenkirchen-Bismarck line,
- Gladbeck-Zweckel station on the Winterswijk–Gelsenkirchen-Bismarck line.

The Gladbeck stations are served by the following services:

- the Regional-Express 14 "Emscher-Münsterland-Express":
  Essen – Bottrop – Gladbeck West – Gladbeck-Zweckel – Dorsten – (Coesfeld (Westf)* / Borken (Westf)* ) *Flügelzug
- the Regionalbahn 43 "Emschertal-Bahn":
  Dortmund – Herne - Wanne-Eickel – Gladbeck Ost – Gladbeck-Zweckel – Dorsten
- and Rhine-Ruhr S-Bahn line S 9:
  Recklinghausen / Haltern am See – Gladbeck West – Bottrop – Essen – Velbert - Wuppertal - Hagen

== Notable people ==
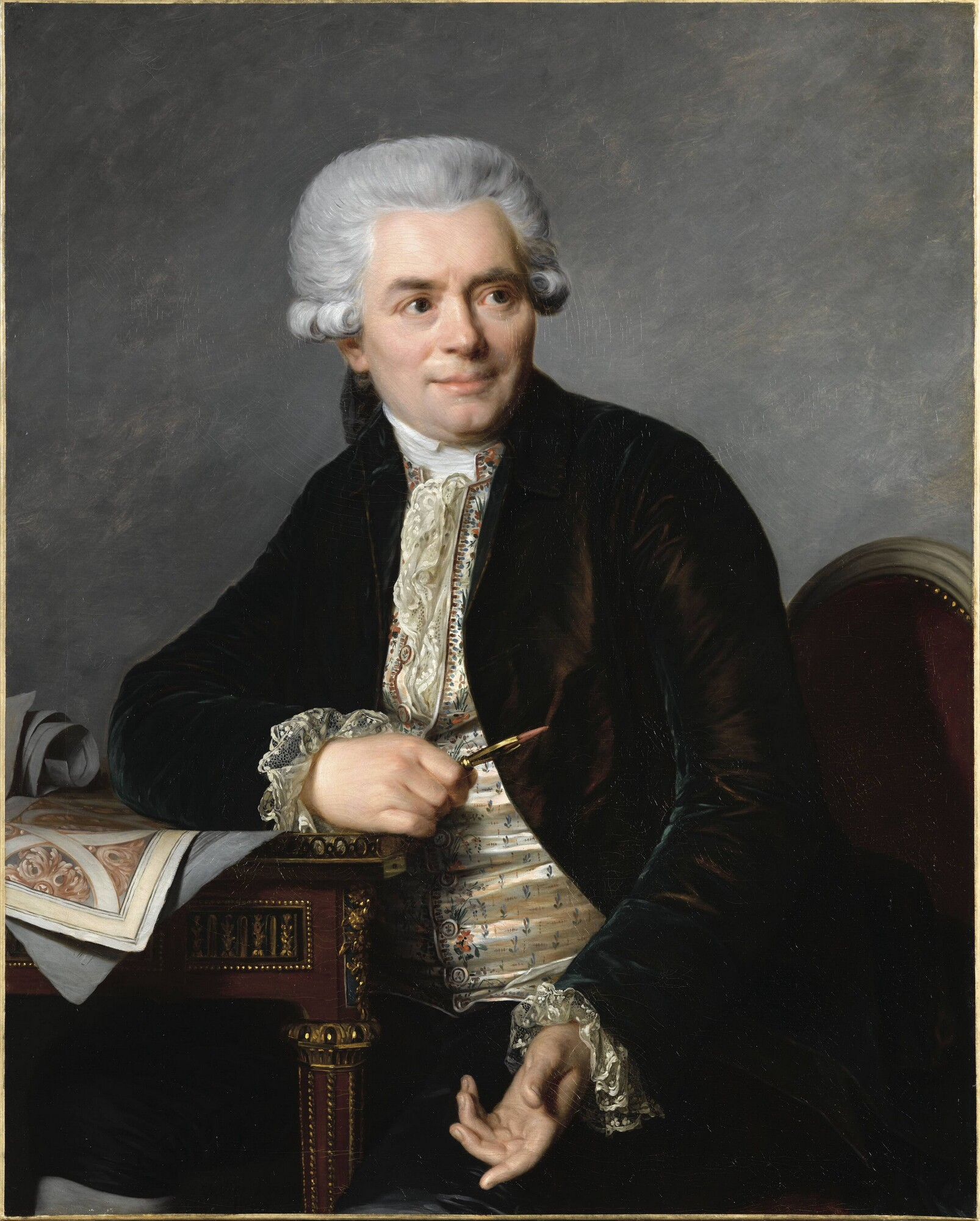
Johann Heinrich Riesener 1785

- Jean-Henri Riesener (German: Johann Heinrich Riesener, 1734–1806 in Paris), cabinetmaker having worked at the French household in the 18th century. A grammar school, a fountain in front of the townhall as well as a street are dedicated to him.
- Hermann Nattkämper (1911–2005), footballer, won the German cup 1934 and 1935 as a player of the FC Schalke 04
- Willy Kaiser (1912–1986), boxer, Olympic champion 1936
- Joseph Jadrzejczak (1918–1990), French football national player
- Harald Deilmann (1920–2008), architect
- Heinz Wewers (1927–2008), footballer
- Helmut Janz (1934–2000), athlete and Olympic athlete 1960
- Gerhard Prokop (1939–2002), football goalkeeper
- Werner Müller (born 1946), historian
- Claudia Lux (born 1950), librarian, General Director of the Zentral- und Landesbibliothek Berlin 1997–2012
- Berthold Possemeyer (born 1951), concert singer (baritone) and university lecturer
- Armin Rohde (born 1955), actor
- Michael Kraus (born 1955), swimmer
- Sebastian Fricke (born 1987), Bronze Medal winner at the paralympics in Rio de Janeiro 2016
- Caroline Masson (born 1989), professional golfer
- Pierre-Michel Lasogga (born 1991), German footballer
- Julian Draxler (born 1993), footballer for Paris Saint Germain and Germany national team
- Annika Drazek (born 1995), bobsledder and former track & field athlete

== Twin towns – sister cities ==
Gladbeck is twinned with:

- Alanya, Turkey
- Enfield, England, United Kingdom
- Fushun, China
- Marcq-en-Barœul, France
- Schwechat, Austria
- Wodzisław Śląski, Poland

== See also ==
- Gladbeck hostage crisis
