= The Curse of Modigliani =

- Directed by: Diana Ringo
- Written by: Diana Ringo
- Produced by: Diana Ringo
- Starring: Edward Pishiyski; Diana Ringo; Aksel Spencer
- Music by: Diana Ringo
- Release date: 7 December 2025
- Running time: 102 minutes
- Country: Finland
- Language: English

The Curse of Modigliani is a 2025 English-language Finnish psychological drama film directed by Diana Ringo and starring British actor Edward Pishiyski. It follows a struggling painter in Helsinki whose obsession with the Italian artist Amedeo Modigliani begins to dominate his personal life.

== Cast ==
- Edward Pishiyski as Max
- Diana Ringo as Julia
- Aksel Spencer as Leo
- Ilkka Hautala as gallerist
- Sakari Viittala as art collector
- Tuure Ollila as doctor

== Plot ==
The story follows Max (Edward Pishiyski), a struggling painter living in Helsinki, Finland. Burdened by financial instability and deepening self-doubt, Max's life takes a turn when he discovers an antique diary he believes once belonged to the Italian painter Amedeo Modigliani. As Max becomes increasingly preoccupied with the diary and Modigliani himself, his grip on reality weakens, and despite the efforts of his girlfriend Julia and his friend and manager Leo to support him, his mental state deteriorates and leads him down a path of self-destruction.

== Production ==
The film was entirely shot in Helsinki. The production features eight original oil paintings created specifically for the film by artist Elena Ringo.

== Release and reception ==
The trailer was released on 22 February 2025. The film was released on 7 December 2025 on Amazon Prime. It was positively reviewed by critic WorldFilmGeek, who praised the acting of Pishiyski and the direction by Ringo.

The soundtrack consisting of 37 tracks was released on 2 January 2026.
