= George Orwell on Screen =

2018 non-fiction book by David Ryan

George Orwell on Screen: Adaptations, Documentaries and Docudramas on Film and Television
- Author: David Ryan
- Subject: History of literature
- Publication date: June 2019 McFarland & Company
- Pages: 255
- ISBN: 9781476673691

George Orwell on Screen: Adaptations, Documentaries and Docudramas on Film and Television is a book-length comprehensive exploration written by British writer and journalist David Ryan, delving into the cinematic and televisual adaptations of the works of British author and essayist George Orwell. It was published by McFarland & Company in 2018. Ryan's analysis is supported by interviews with key industry figures, including actors, writers, directors, and producers, providing a perspective on the evolution of Orwellian themes in visual media.

The book was one of the Times Literary Supplement's books of the year in 2018. On the strength of this book, The Criterion Collection interviewed David Ryan for its Blu-ray of Michael Radford's film 1984. Reviewer Scott Stalcup wrote that Ryan's book "very well may be the most important contribution to the field since Michael Shelden's authorized literary biography".
