= 1988 Ordzhonikidze bus hijacking =

Bus hijacking event in the Soviet Union

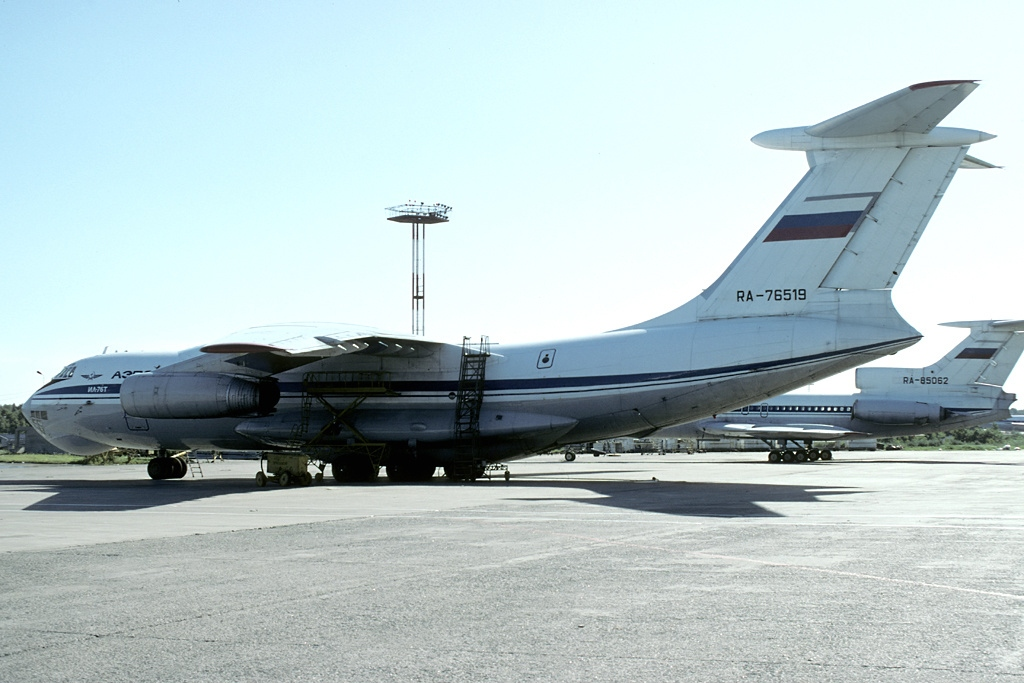
- The aircraft involved in the incident in 1994
- Location: Ordzhonikidze, Soviet Union (Now Vladikavkaz, Russia)
- Date: 1–2 December 1988
- Target: LAZ-697 bus with schoolchildren
- Attack type: Hijacking, hostage taking
- Deaths: None
- Perpetrators: Pavel Yakshiyants; Vladimir Muravlev; German Vishnyakov; Vladimir Anastasov; Tofiy Jafarov

On 1 December 1988, a LAZ-697 bus carrying around thirty pupils and one teacher from school 42 in Ordzhonikidze, Soviet Union (now Vladikavkaz in Russia) was hijacked by five-armed criminals, led by Pavel Yakshiyants.

The local authorities conceded to the hijackers' demands and provided an Ilyushin Il-76 aircraft to fly the hijackers to Israel. Upon landing at Tel Aviv's Ben Gurion Airport, however, the hijackers surrendered to local troops and police without resistance. They were extradited to the Soviet Union and sentenced to prison terms, although at that time Israel and the Soviet Union had no extradition treaty as relations were still severed. All hostages were released. The Defense Minister of Israel at the time, Yitzhak Rabin, criticized Soviet authorities for providing the hijackers with an aircraft and flying them to Israel in exchange for the release of the hostages.

== Perpetrators ==
The five hijackers were Pavel Levonovich Yakshiyants, Vladimir Alexandrovich Muravlev, German Lvovich Vishnyakov, Vladimir Robertovich Anastasov, and Tofiy Jafarov.

Yakshiyants and Muravlev were already ex-convicts before the incident. Yakshiyants, an Armenian, was first convicted at age 17 and sentenced to two years in prison for theft. Later, he was sentenced to four years in prison for robbery. In 1972, he was sentenced to ten years, again for robbery, but released on parole in 1979.

== Hijacking ==
The group of 30–31 schoolchildren had finished a field trip to a local printing plant when a man approached them saying he was the driver sent to take them home. Subsequently, the teacher and her 10- and 11-year-old pupils boarded the bus to find themselves the hostages of five-armed people. The children were used as a human shield and bargaining chip. The hijackers rode to the local obkom and demanded about 2 million rubles (about US$3.3 million at the time) and an aircraft. The bus windows were curtained so that the law enforcement units could not see what was happening inside.

The authorities conceded, but the airport of Ordzhonikidze was unable to handle the large Ilyushin Il-76 cargo aircraft that was sent. The hijackers drove to the airport of Mineralnye Vody with free passage. Russia's Alpha Group was mobilized for a possible hostage rescue. It was learned that the hijackers were planning to land in Tashkent to pick up a friend then fly to Pakistan, but changed their mind and chose Israel instead. According to Israeli Army commander Maj. Gen. Amram Mitzna, the hijackers believed they would be safe in Israel because they had heard that recent Israeli elections had produced an anticommunist government.

The aircraft, escorted by Israeli fighter aircraft, landed on a remote darkened runway. It was surrounded by army and police vehicles and ambulances. According to an Ilyushin Il-76 crew member, the hijackers asked whether they had landed in Israel or Syria, and if it was Israel they would stay. Mitzna told that the hijackers demanded proof that they were actually in Israel, wanting to hear Yiddish or see a Star of David. When a soldier on the runway spoke a few words in Yiddish, the hijackers left the aircraft with their hands in the air. The hostages were flown back to Ordzhonikidze.

Perpetrators have been arrested by Israeli police and sent to Soviet Union for sentencing. In March 1989, Yakshiyants was sentenced to 15 years in prison, and Murlav to 14 years. The remaining defendants received sentences ranging from three to fourteen years.

== Media ==
The 1990 film Frenzied Bus was based on the hijacking.

The 2024 biographical film Komandir was based on the hijacking.
