= Risto Lauriala =

Finnish classical pianist

Risto Vilho Johannes Lauriala (born 21 November 1949) is a Finnish classical pianist.

== Education ==
Lauriala was born in Oulu, Finland. He studied at the Sibelius Academy (1969–1972), and completed a master's degree in piano in 1972. He graduated from the University of Helsinki, majoring in the humanities, and received a bachelor's degree in musicology in 1973. In addition, he studied piano privately in London with Ilona Kabos and Maria Curcio, as well as at the University of Music and Performing Arts, Vienna, attending masterclasses with Professor Dieter Weber (1973–1975).

== Career ==
Lauriala has performed as soloist with almost all symphony orchestras in Finland. He has performed in solo recitals, in chamber music groups and as an accompanist for Lieder, both at home and abroad. He has worked as a teacher and accompanist at the Sibelius Academy since 1976, specializing in piano and chamber music. He has been a lecturer in accompaniment at the Sibelius Academy since 1982.

== Awards ==
In 1970, Lauriala received a first prize at the Maj Lind Piano Competition in Finland, and in 1974, at the Stepanow Competition in Vienna. In addition, he was a semi-finalist at the International Johann Sebastian Bach Competition in 1980.

== Recordings ==
He has made several recordings with the labels Alba (incl. Bach, L.v. Beethoven, Schubert and Schubert-Liszt), Fuga and Naxos (incl. Sibelius, S. Palmgren, J. Suk and transcriptions of Bach's works for violin and organ).
