= Josef Ringo =

Russian scientist, inventor, and writer

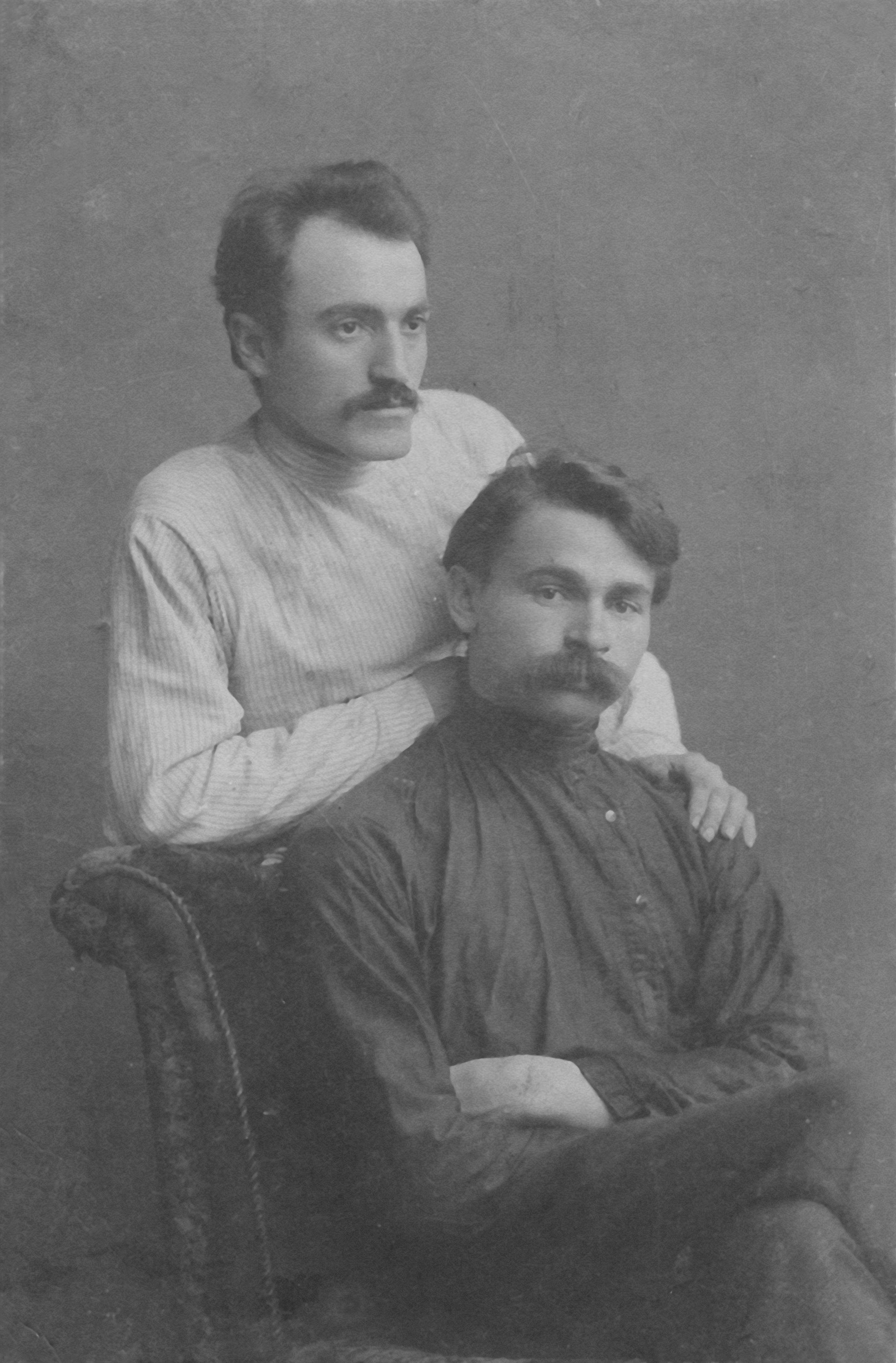
- Josef Ringo (sitting on the right)
- Born: Josef Ringo; 1883; Vitebsk, Russian Empire
- Died: 1946 (aged 62–63); Moscow, Soviet Union
- Education: University of Bern
- Occupations: Electrical engineer, inventor, writer

Josef Abramovich Ringo (Russian: Иосиф Абрамович Ринго) was a Russian electrical engineer, inventor, and writer.

== Life and career ==
Josef Ringo was born in Vitebsk in 1883. From 1905 until 1918 he studied and worked in both Switzerland and France. Ringo graduated from the Universities of Bern, Zurich and Nancy, received an education as an engineer and philosopher. He was fluent in five languages.

In 1917 in Switzerland he published the book Jewish Question in its Historical Context and its Proposed Solution (German: Die Judenfrage in ihrem geschichtlichen Zusammenhang und Vorschläge ihrer Lösung). In his work Josef Ringo explores the possibility of creating a Jewish state. The work offers a critical analysis of the Jewish question, arguing that centuries of continuous ethnic mixing and an over-reliance on trade fractured the people's national unity and social cohesion. This lack of a unified people and cohesive society casts doubt on the immediate feasibility of an independent state. To overcome these internal obstacles, Ringo suggests that a Jewish state could only become a reality through a fundamental transformation of the people; this transformation would require a shift toward productive physical labor, specifically agriculture, within a new, suitable territory designed to rebuild their national character.

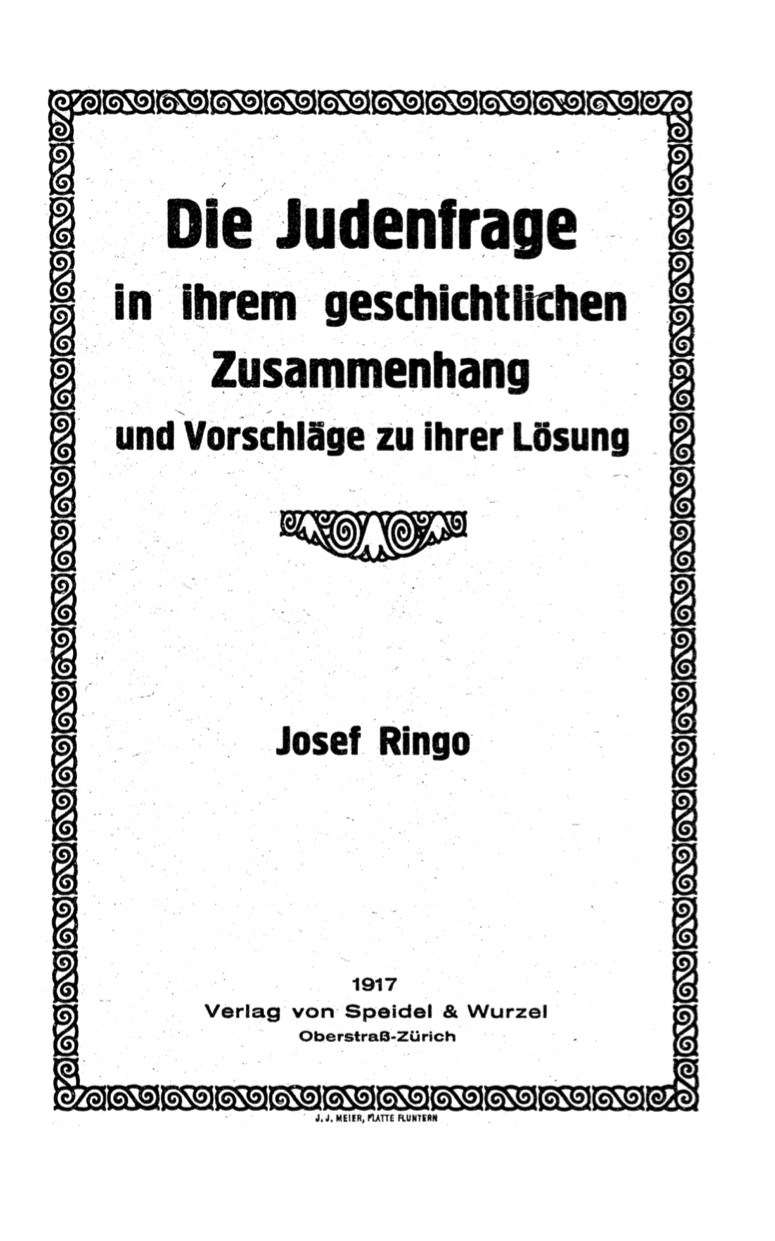
Title page of Die Judenfrage in ihrem geschichtlichen Zusammenhang und Vorschläge ihrer Lösung. 1917

In Switzerland Josef met Vladimir Lenin. Lenin invited Ringo to come to Moscow to take part in the plan of electrification of Moscow. From 1918 to 1922 he worked as the head of the electric department of Moscow and the Moscow region, provincial electrical engineer, then director of the electrical installation office of the Moscow Sovnarkhoz and the department of small-scale electrification of the Supreme Soviet of the National Economy. Later he was employed as a worker in the chemical industry. In 1921 under Lenin's order Ringo managed to electrify the residence of Lenin in Gorki in an extremely short amount of time. Ringo patented a large number of inventions, including patents in the field of lightning protection.

== Links ==
- Lenin's archive. November 1920 (third decade). (in Russian)
- Lenin's archive. April 1921 (second decade). (in Russian)
- Lenin's archive. Январь 1921 (second decade til 22). (in Russian)
