= Quirrenbach =

Quirrenbach may refer to:

- 58098 Quirrenbach, a Hungaria asteroid
- Quirrenbach (Pleisbach), a river of North Rhine-Westphalia, Germany
