= Ölberg =

Ölberg is German for "oil hill" and may refer to:

Hills:

- Großer Ölberg, a hill in the Siebengebirge, Germany
- Ölberg (Görlitz), a hill on the Görlitz Holy Tomb site, Germany
- Ölberg (Nuremberg), the site of Nuremberg Castle, Germany
- German name for the Mount of Olives, east of Jerusalem's old town

Places:

- Ölberg (Rottenbuch), village in the municipality of Rottenbuch, county of Weilheim-Schongau, Bavaria, Germany
- Ölberg (Schöllnach), village in the market municipality of Schöllnach, county of Deggendorf, Bavaria, Germany
- Ölberg (Wuppertal) ciudad Renania del norte
- Ölberg (Innsbruck), place in Innsbruck, Austria
