= Rolandseck =

Borough of Remagen, Germany

Coordinates: 50°38′N 7°12′E

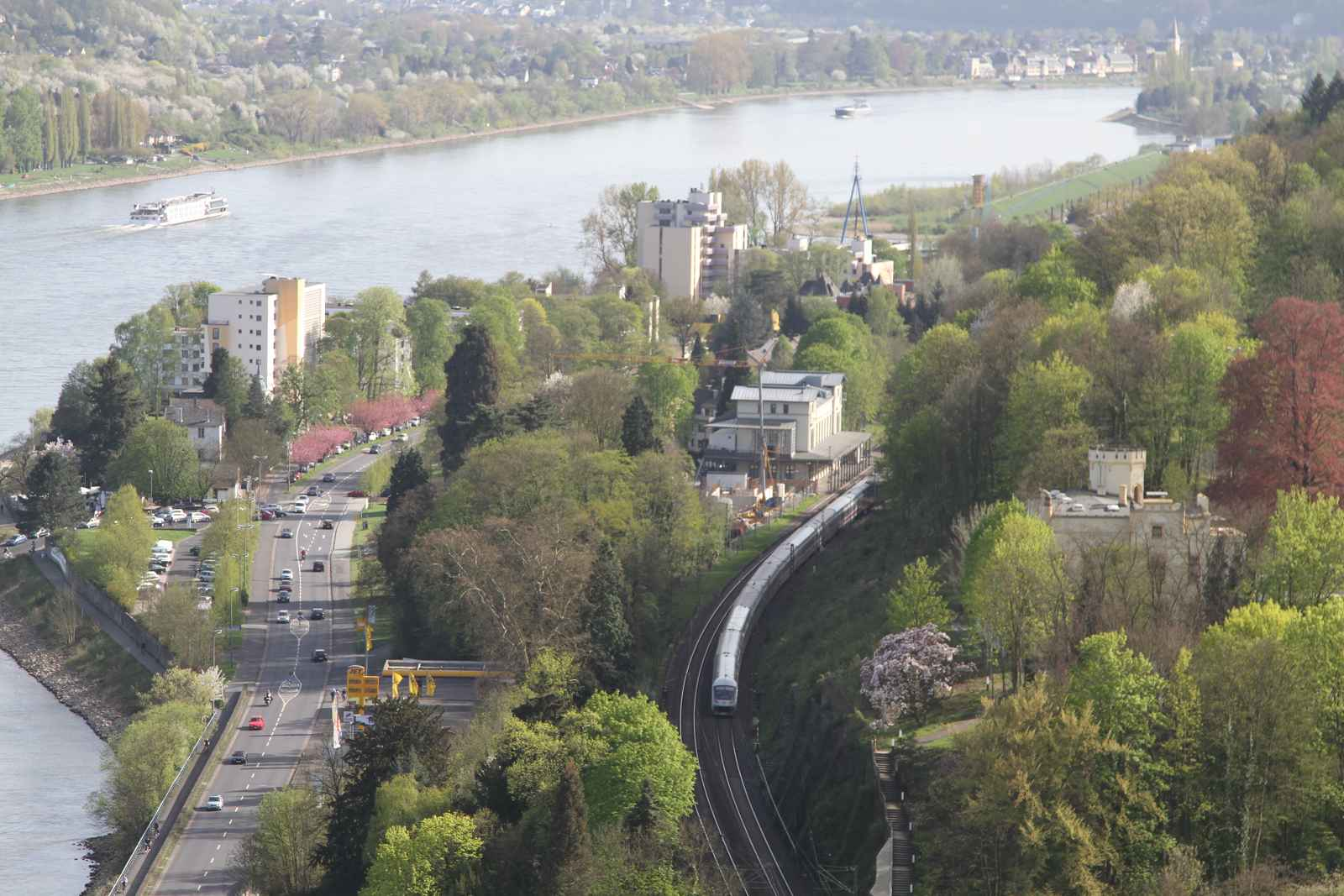
Rolandseck in 2011

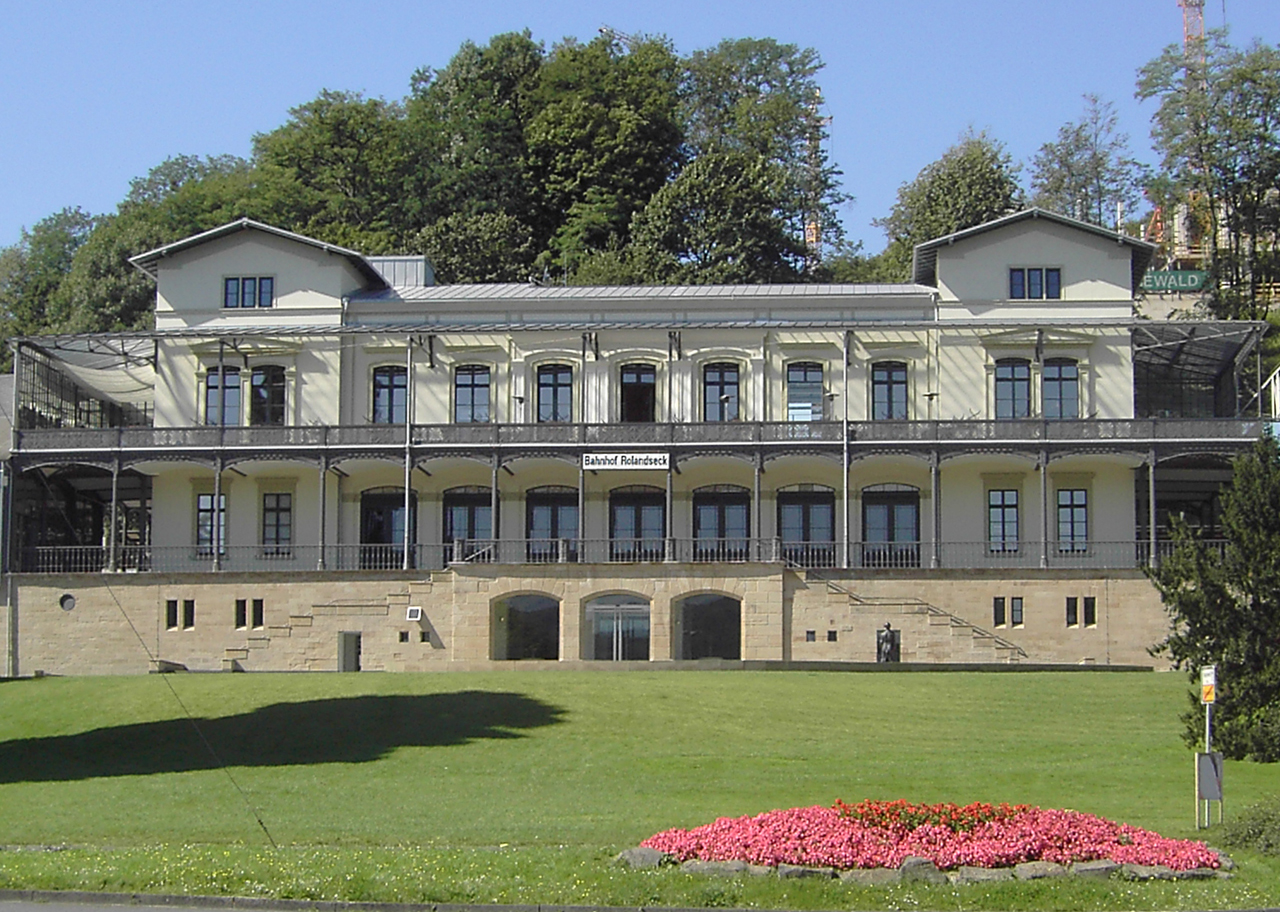
Rolandseck station

Rolandseck is a borough in the town of Remagen in Rhineland-Palatinate, Germany.

The place consists almost entirely of villas and is a favorite summer resort. Crowning the vine-clad hills behind it lie the ruins of the castle, a picturesque ivy-covered arch, whence a fine view is obtained of the Siebengebirge and the Rhine valley as far as Bonn. Rolandseck is connected to Bad Honnef by a car ferry, with the Lohfelderfähre district on the opposite bank of the Rhine. Immediately below Rolandseck in mid-river is the island of Nonnenwerth, on which is a nursing school under the conduct of Franciscan nuns, established in 1850. The convent which formerly stood here was founded in 1122 and secularized in 1802. Tradition assigns the foundation of the castle of Rolandseck to Charlemagne's paladin, Roland. It was certainly built at a very early date, as it was restored by Frederick I, archbishop of Cologne, in 1120, and it was a fortress until the end of the 15th century.

== Transport links ==
Rolandseck station is served by the lines RB26 and RB30. Rolandseck is located in the area of the transport association Verkehrsverbund Rhein-Mosel (VRM), fare zone number 819.
