= Aegidienberger =

Breed of horse

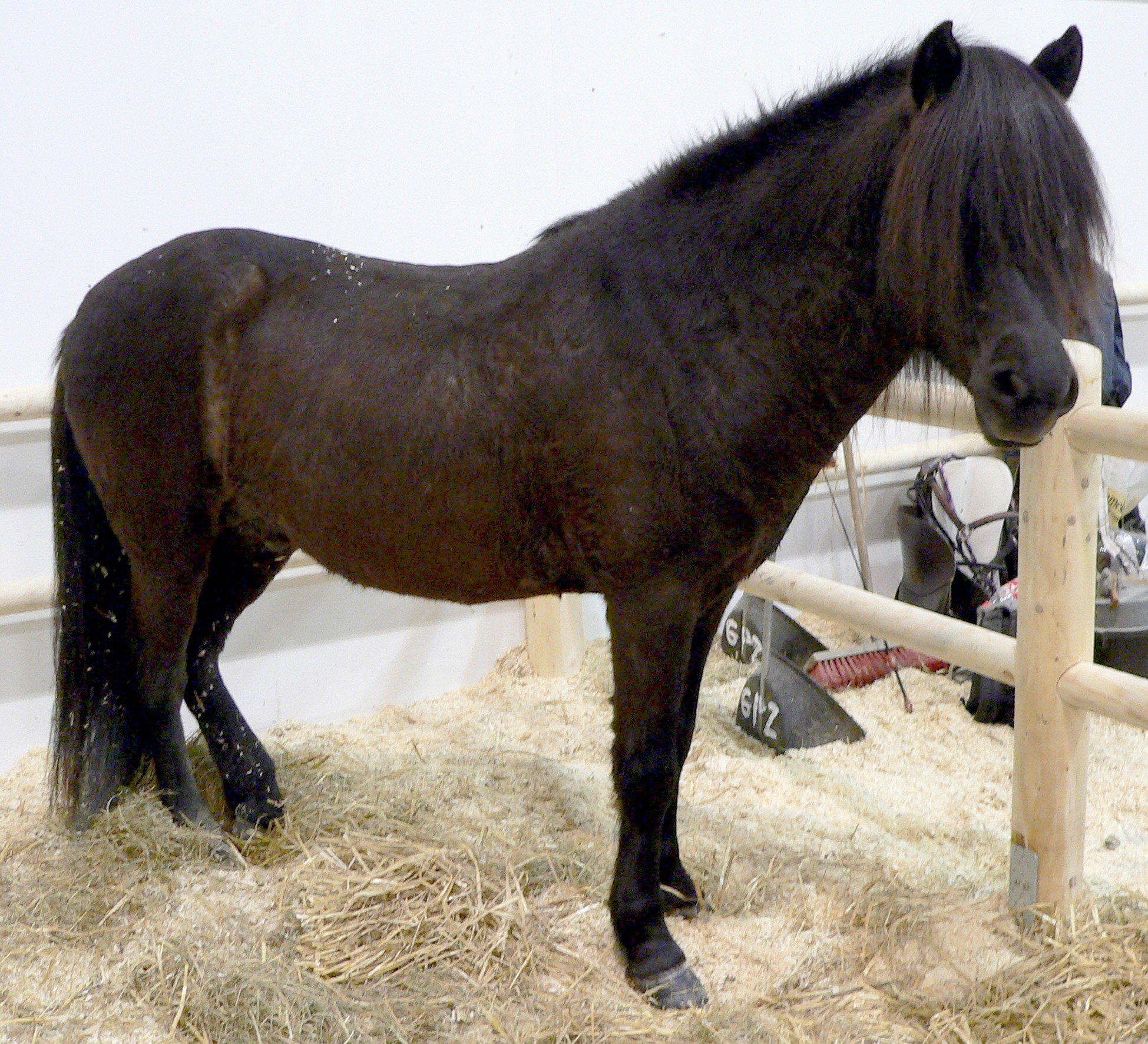
- Conservation status: TiHo (2004): potentially endangered; FAO (2007): critical; DAD-IS (2022): at risk/critical
- Other names: Aegidienberg
- Country of origin: Germany

Traits
- Height: 143–152 cm
- Colour: any

The Aegidienberger is a modern German breed of riding horse. It is named for the borough of Aegidienberg in the Rheinland, where it was bred in the latter part of the twentieth century. It is a cross of two foreign breeds, the Peruvian Paso and the Icelandic. Like the Icelandic horse, it can perform the tölt, a fast ambling gait.

== Characteristics ==
The Aegidienberger has a short, muscular, and upright neck with a head that is carried proudly. Overall, it has a strong and sturdy build.

== History ==
The Aegidienberger is a cross between two breeds foreign to Germany, the Peruvian Paso and the Icelandic horse. Selection was specifically for the ability to perform the tölt, a fast ambling gait; horses without this ability are excluded from registration. A breed society or interest group, the Interessengemeinschaft und Förderverein für Aegidienbergerpferde, was formed in 1994.

In the twenty-four years from 1997 to 2020, numbers reported for the breed have never exceeded 60; in 2020 the breeding population was reported to be 29, consisting of 23 mares and 6 stallions. Its conservation status is critical.

== Use ==
The Aegidienberger was bred to be a comfortable riding horse with the tölt gait of the Icelandic, but rather larger and with better adaptation to warmer climates.

== See also ==
- List of German horse breeds
