= Lohfelderfähre =

Coordinates: 50°37′54.69″N 7°12′51″E

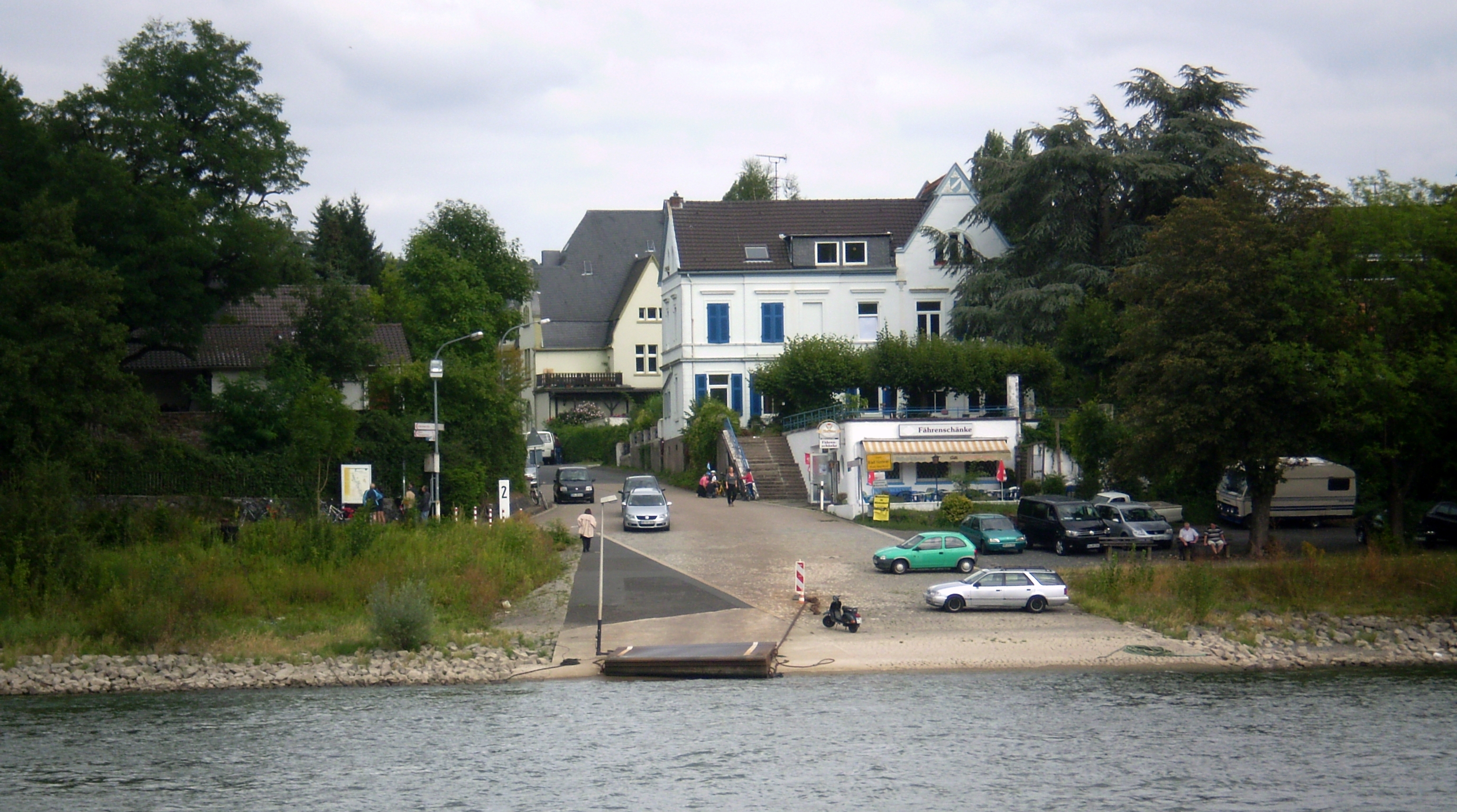
Lohfelderfähre

Lohfelderfähre is a district of Bad Honnef, Germany. It evolved around the eastern bank pier of the car ferry across the Rhine between Bad Honnef and Rolandseck.
