= Quirrenbach (Pleisbach) =

River in Germany

Location
- Country: Germany
- States: North Rhine-Westphalia

Physical characteristics
- Mouth
  - location: Pleisbach
  - coordinates: 50.6868°N 7.2971°E

Basin features
- Progression: Pleisbach→ Sieg→ Rhine→ North Sea

Quirrenbach is a small river of North Rhine-Westphalia, Germany. It is 7.5 km (4.7 mi) long and is a right tributary of the Pleisbach in Hüscheid.

== See also ==
- List of rivers of North Rhine-Westphalia
