= Bad Honnef =

- Town
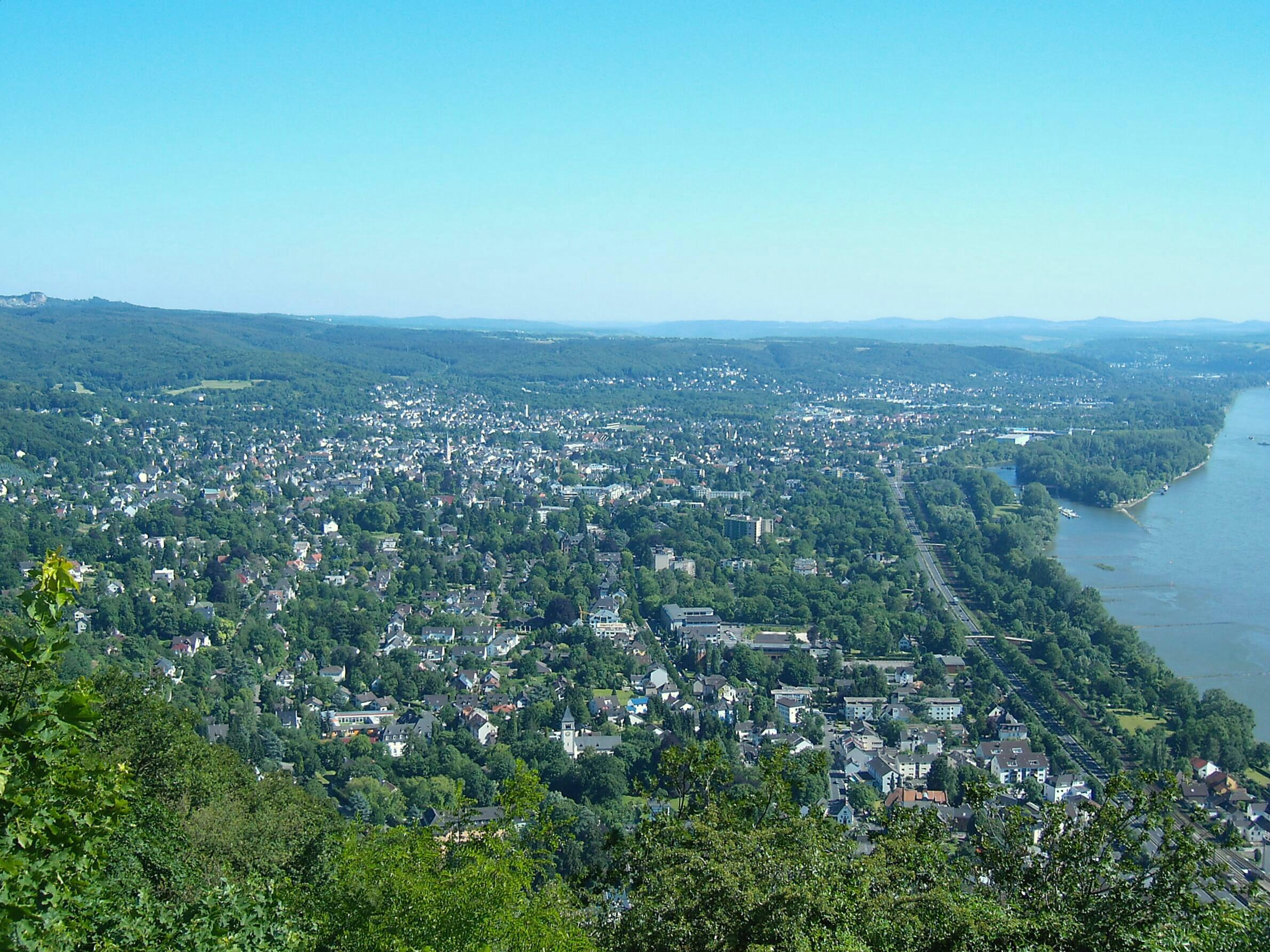
- Bad Honnef seen from the Drachenfels

- Coat of arms

- Location of Bad Honnef within Rhein-Sieg-Kreis district
- Interactive map of Bad Honnef
- Location within Germany Location within North Rhine-Westphalia
- Coordinates: 50°38′42″N 7°13′37″E
- Country: Germany
- State: North Rhine-Westphalia
- Admin. region: Köln
- District: Rhein-Sieg-Kreis
- Subdivisions: 20

Government
  - Mayor (2025–30): Philipp Herzog

Area
  - Total: 48.17 km^{2} (18.60 sq mi)
- Elevation: 53–455 m (174–1,493 ft)

Population (2025-12-31)
  - Total: 24,930
  - Density: 517.5/km^{2} (1,340/sq mi)
- Time zone: UTC+01:00 (CET)
  - Summer (DST): UTC+02:00 (CEST)
- Postal codes: 53604
- Dialling codes: 02224
- Vehicle registration: SU
- Website: www.bad-honnef.de

Bad Honnef (German pronunciation: [baːt ˈhɔnɛf]) is a spa town in Germany near Bonn in the Rhein-Sieg district, North Rhine-Westphalia. It is located on the border of the neighbouring state Rhineland-Palatinate. To the north it lies on the slopes of the Drachenfels (“Dragon's Rock”) mountain, part of the Siebengebirge.

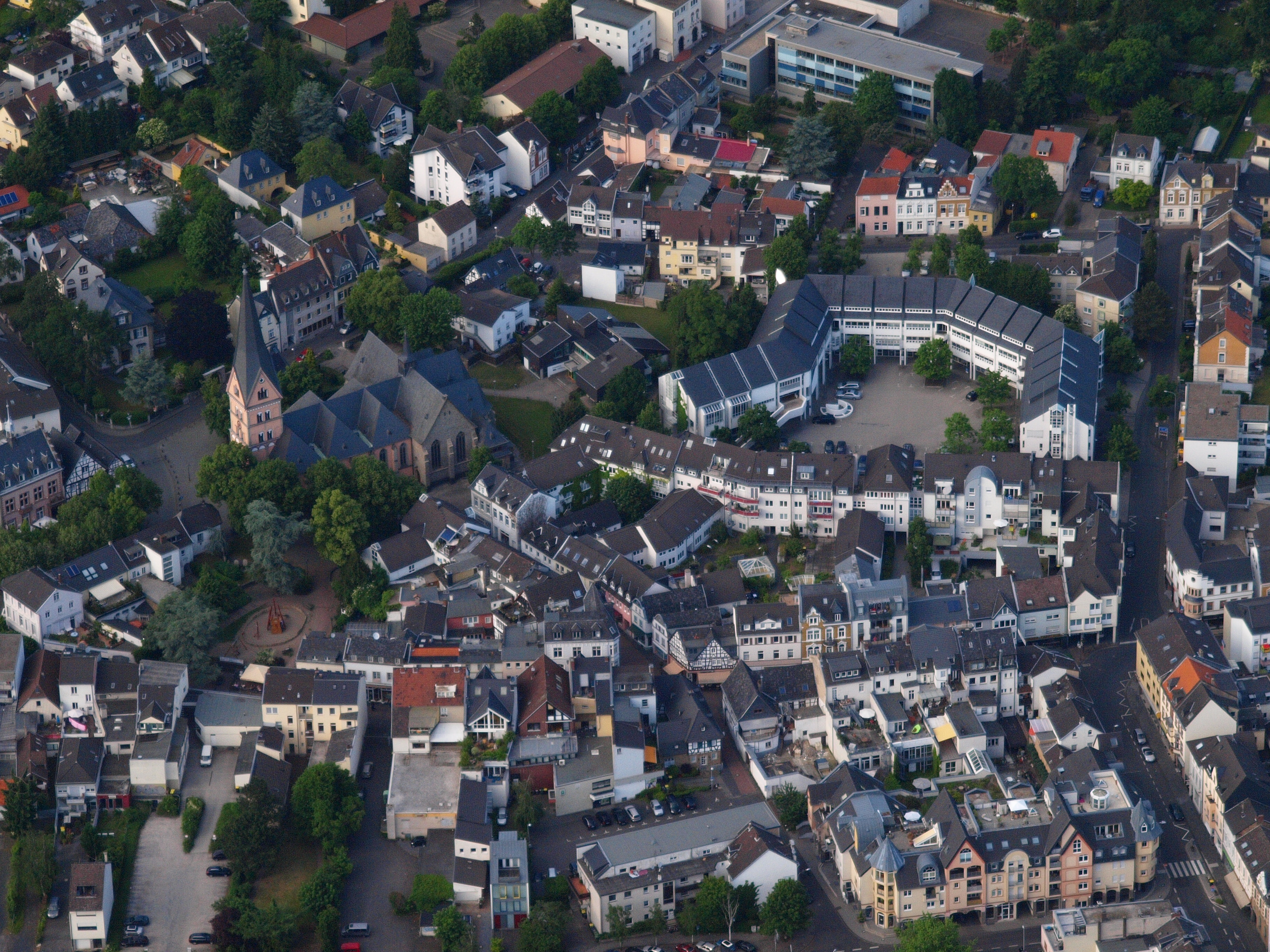
Honnef, Aerial view

== Overview ==
Bad Honnef is home to a mineral spring called the Drachenquelle ("Dragon Spring") which was discovered in 1897. This discovery led to Honnef, as the town was called at the time, transforming from a wine-growing town to a spa town, adding the prefix Bad to its name. The mineral spring has been used for both drinking and bathing, and its existence has historically been a big draw for visitors including Queen Sophie of Sweden, who visited from 1892 to 1906.

Bad Honnef includes several districts, such as Aegidienberg, Rhöndorf, and Lohfelderfähre, which is located near the Rhine ferry crossing to Rolandseck. During his term as first chancellor of the Federal Republic of Germany (then West Germany), Konrad Adenauer lived (and died) in Bad Honnef, as it was near Bonn, then the capital of the republic. Also, German politician and leader of the Free Democratic Party Guido Westerwelle was born in Bad Honnef.

Since the 1980s Bad Honnef has developed into an important place for conferences in Germany. Because of the close proximity to the still internationally important Federal City of Bonn, a number federal institutions used to be located in Bad Honnef. A number of important politicians, such as Willy Brandt and Konrad Adenauer, lived in Bad Honnef while active in politics.

The head office of the Nationalpark Siebengebirge project was also planned to be in Bad Honnef; however the project was rejected in a referendum on 27 September 2009.

Bad Honnef has the highest purchasing power of all towns in North Rhine-Westphalia; its percentage of millionaires is also one of the highest. With 26.5% it has one of the highest percentage populations over 65 years old in North Rhine-Westphalia.

== Population ==
Historical population

Year	Pop.	±% p.a.
1965	18,842	—
1970	19,943	+1.14%
1975	20,898	+0.94%
1980	20,906	+0.01%
1985	20,471	−0.42%
1990	22,577	+1.98%
1995	24,462	+1.62%

Year	Pop.	±% p.a.
2000	25,004	+0.44%
2005	25,241	+0.19%
2010	25,213	−0.02%
2015	25,654	+0.35%
2020	25,759	+0.08%
2025	24,930	−0.65%

Source: Landesdatabank Nordrhein-Westfalen

== Politics ==
=== City council ===
After the 2025 local elections, the Bad Honnef city council is composed as follows:

Party	Votes	%	+/-	Seats	+/-
Christian Democratic Union (CDU)	5,406	42.2	▲9.6	17	▲7
Alliance 90/The Greens (Grüne)	2,663	20.8	▼7.5	8	▼1
Social Democratic Party (SPD)	1,694	13.2	▼4.5	5	▼1
Citizens' Block Bad Honnef e.V. (BB)	1,401	10.9	▼4.4	4	▼1
Volt (Volt)	565	4.4	New	2	New
Alternative for Germany (AfD)	551	4.3	New	2	New
Free Democratic Party (FDP)	546	4.3	▼2.0	2	±0
Valid votes	12,826	98.7			
Invalid votes	176	1.4			
Total	13,002	100.0		40	▲8
Electorate/voter turnout	20,497	63.4			
Source: City of Bad Honnef

=== Mayors ===
Term of office	Mayors
1862–1876	Clemens Joseph Adams (1831–1876)
1877–1889	Aloys Hubert Schumacher
1889–1907	Theodor Waechter
1907–1919	Peter Joseph Brenig
1919–1929	Albert Berns
1929–1933	Alfred von Reumont (1898–1984)
1933–1934	Heinrich Behr
1934–1935	temporary von Wittich
1935–1945	Johannes „Hans“ Schloemer
1945–1946	Heinrich Goertz
1946–1949	Jakob Mölbert
1949–1952	Peter Rustemeyer
1952–1962	Jakob Mölbert
1962–1964	Albert Weidenbach
1964–1972	Jakob Mölbert
1972–1982	Franz Josef Kayser (1928–2015)
1982–1990	Werner Osterbrink
1990–1999	Franz Josef Kayser
1999–2004	Hans-Peter Brassel
2004–2014	Wally Feiden (born 1940)
2014–2025	Otto Neuhoff
since 2025	Philipp Herzog

== Twin towns – sister cities ==
Bad Honnef is twinned with:

- Berck, France
- Cadenabbia (Griante), Italy
- Ludvika, Sweden
- Wittichenau, Germany

== Notable people ==
- Curt Haase (1881–1943), general in World War II
- Boris Papandopulo (1906–1991), composer and conductor
- Franz Brungs (born 1936), football player and coach
- Peter Frankenberg (born 1947), professor and politician (CDU), minister in Baden-Württemberg
- Peter Hintze (1950–2016), politician (CDU), 2013–2016 Vice-President of the Bundestag
- Guido Westerwelle (1961–2016), politician (FDP), Foreign Minister and Vice Chancellor of Germany (2009–2013)
- Sydney Lohmann (born 2000), football player for the Germany national team
- Alfred Nourney (1892–1972), socialite and Titanic survivor
- Joshua Filler (born 1997), professional pool player
