= Pleisbach =

River in Germany

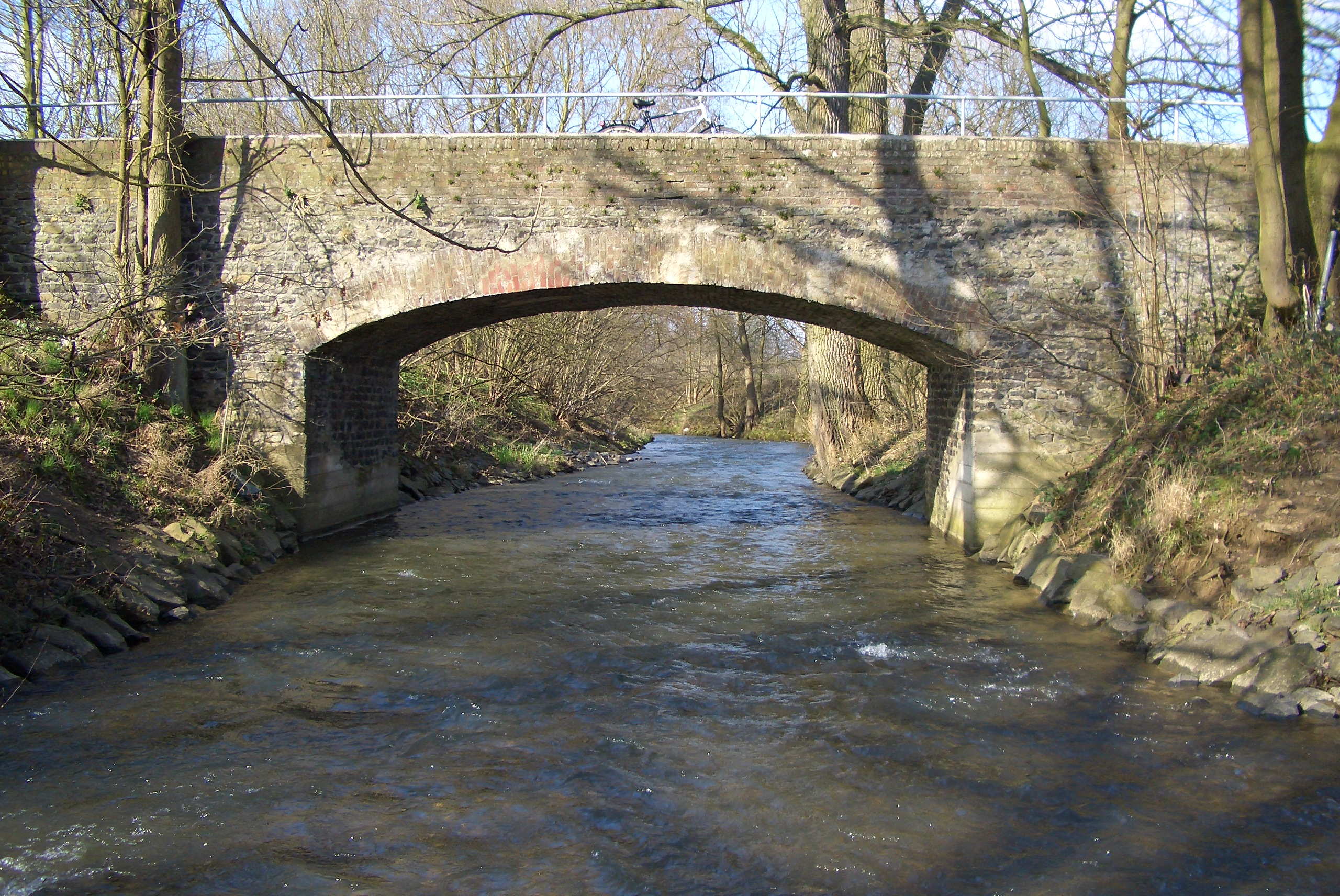

Location
- Country: Germany
- State: North Rhine-Westphalia

Physical characteristics
- Mouth
  - location: Sieg
  - coordinates: 50.7824°N 7.2132°E
- Length: 24.3 km (15.1 mi)

Basin features
- Progression: Sieg→ Rhine→ North Sea

Pleisbach (in its upper course also: Logebach) is a river of North Rhine-Westphalia, Germany. It is a left tributary of river Sieg near Siegburg.

== See also ==
- List of rivers of North Rhine-Westphalia
