= Großer Ölberg =

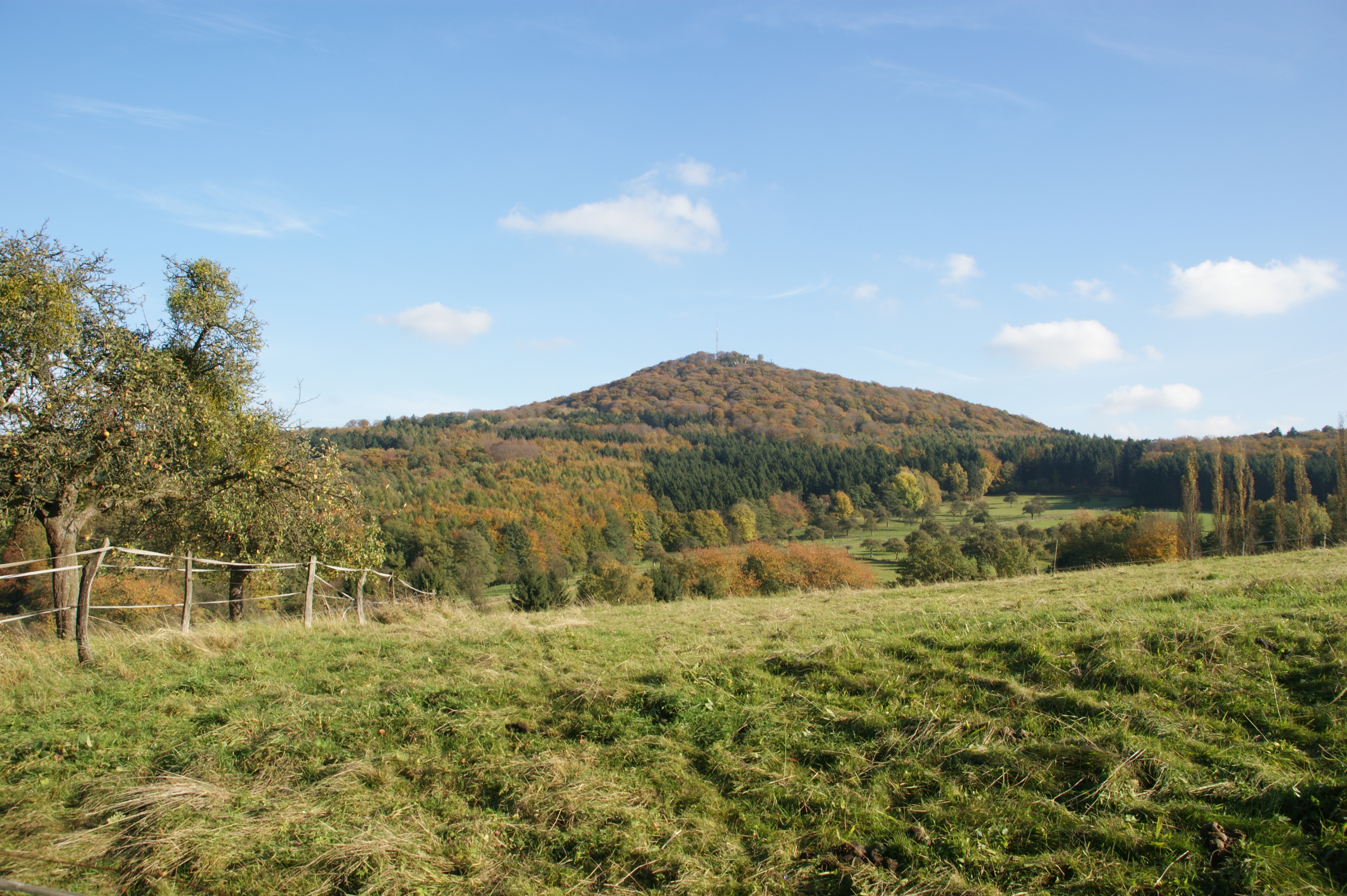
- Großer Ölberg

Highest point
- Elevation: 460 m above sea level (NN) (1,510 ft)
- Prominence: 200 m ↓ Buchholz
- Isolation: 22.4 km → North(-northeast) outlier of the Häuschen (Eifel)
- Coordinates: 50°40′56″N 7°14′54″E

Geography
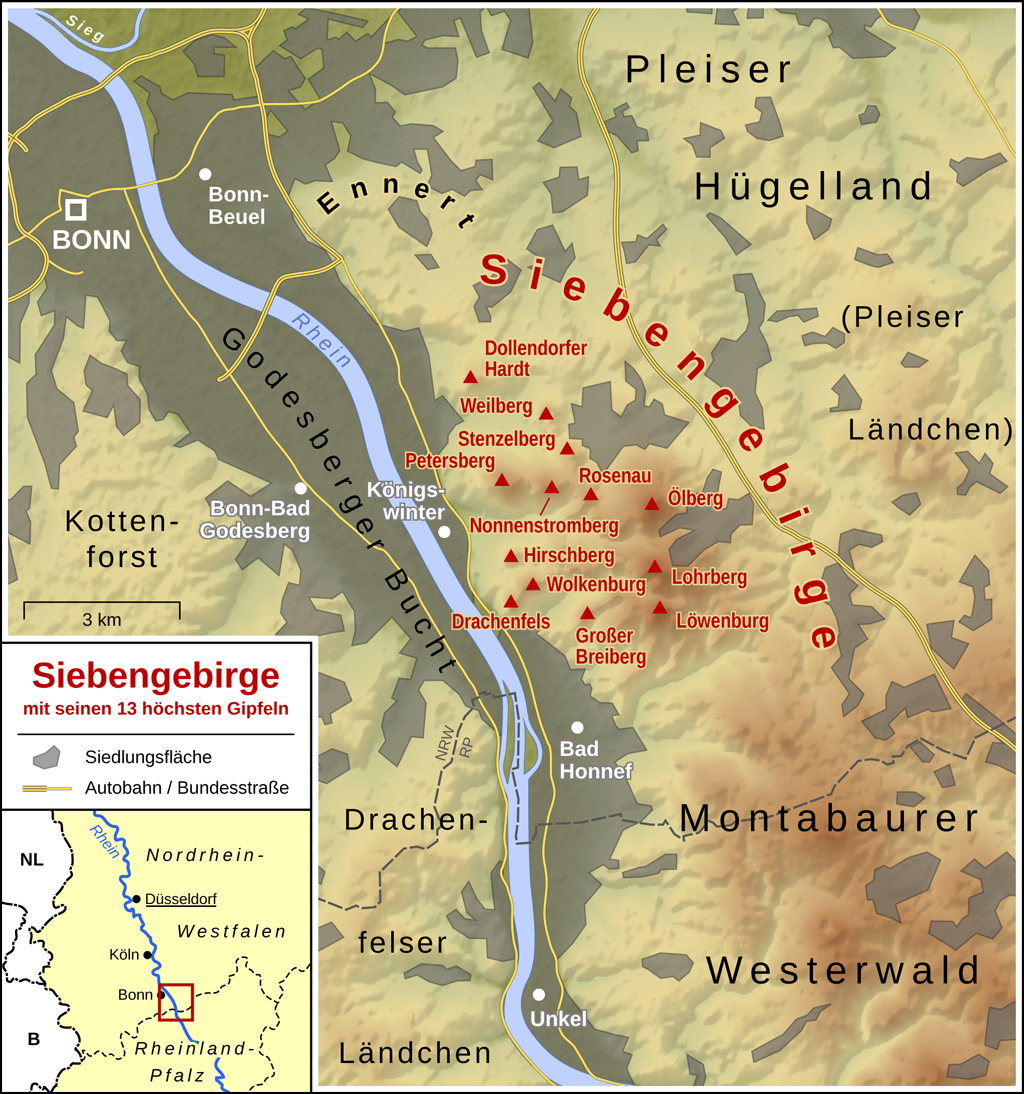
- Location: Königswinter-Ittenbach
- Parent range: Siebengebirge

The Großer Ölberg (also: Oelberg), at 460 metres above sea level, is the highest hill in the Siebengebirge range in Germany. It is located in the borough of Königswinter near the village of Ittenbach and south of a subpeak known as the Kleiner Ölberg (331.7 m above sea level (NN)).

Thanks to the transmission mast on the summit, it is visible from a long way off, for example from the A 3 motorway, and is easily distinguishable from its neighbours. At the summit is a restaurant and observation terrace that offers a very good view of the Siebengebirge as well as the High Eifel, including the Hohe Acht, as well as good views to the west.

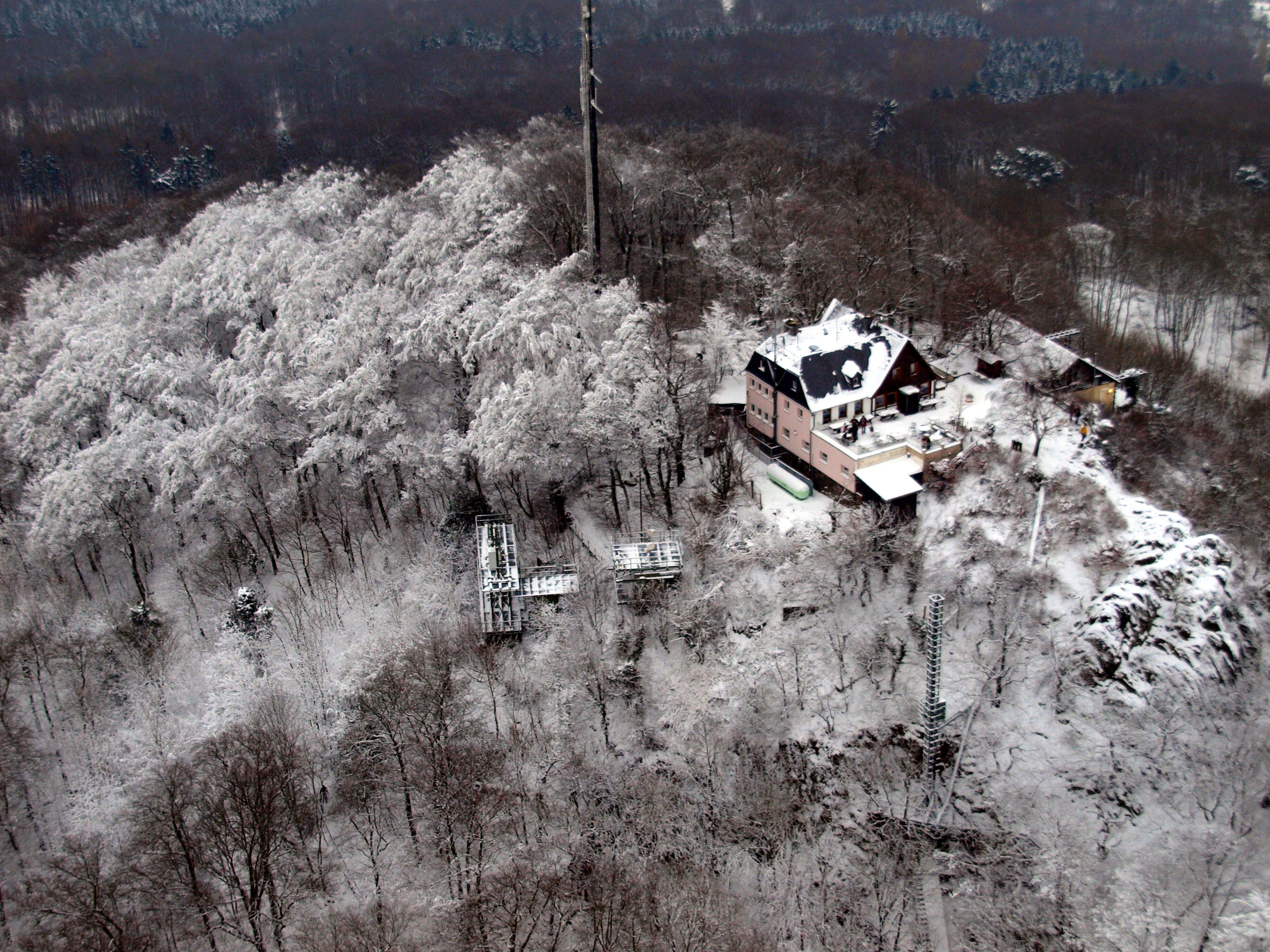
The Ölberg in the Siebengebirge with its restaurant
