= Clash of Futures =

2018 TV documentary series

- Genre: Documentary, Drama
- Created by: Jan Peter; Gunnar Dedio
- Directed by: Jan Peter; Frédéric Goupil
- Countries of origin: Germany; Luxembourg; France
- Original languages: English; French; German
- No. of seasons: 1
- No. of episodes: 8

Production
- Executive producers: Gunnar Dedio; Serge Lalou; Nicolas Steil
- Producers: Regina Bouchehri; Valérie Guérin; Sandra Naumann
- Production locations: Luxembourg; France; Belgium; Germany
- Running time: 52 minutes
- Production companies: LOOKSfilm; Les Films d'Ici

Original release
- Release: September 11, 2018

Clash of Futures is a documentary drama series by Jan Peter and Gunnar Dedio. The series is the continuation of 14 - Diaries of the Great War (2014) and tells the personal stories of thirteen people from all over Europe during the interwar period. The series was part of the eponymous project Clash of Futures. In addition to the series, the project included a theatrical and a radio piece, a book, various Europe-wide special exhibitions and a social media campaign. In the anniversary year of the end of the First World War, the eight-part series first aired September 11, 2018, on Arte.

== Plot ==
Clash of Futures depicts the history of Europe between the end of the First World War in 1918 and the German invasion of Poland in September 1939. The multilingual, documentary drama series condenses history into the subjective experience of individuals. It focuses on the fate of thirteen people from nine nations. The protagonists include the Communist Hans Beimler, the silent film star Pola Negri, the later Auschwitz commander Rudolf Höß and the French anarchist May Picqueray. In addition, there is a continuation of the story of the Russian child soldier Marina Yurlova and the war reporter Charles Edward Montague from 14 - Diaries of the Great War (2014).

== Production ==
The source for the scripts were the protagonists' diaries, letters and memoirs. The series was co-produced by LOOKSfilm (Germany), IRIS Group (Luxembourg) and Les Films d'Ici (France), with Fortis Imaginatio (Germany) and in association with Wajda Studio (Poland). The shooting took place in Luxembourg, France, Belgium and Germany.

== Episodes ==
No.	Title	Original release date
1	"Surviving"	September 11, 2018
2	"Peace"	September 11, 2018
3	"Decisions"	September 11, 2018
4	"Revolution"	September 12, 2018
5	"Crash"	September 12, 2018
6	"Promises"	September 12, 2018
7	"Betrayal"	September 13, 2018
8	"War"	September 13, 2018

== Awards and nominations ==
2019

- Nominated for the Grimme-Preis in the category "Information & Culture"
- Award of the French film composer association UMCF (Union des compositeurs de musiques de films) for Laurent Eyquem in the category: "Best Music for a Documentary"
- Civis - Europe's Media Prize for Integration (Europas Medienpreis für Integration) in the category "Entertainment (fictional)"
- Nominated for the German-French Journalist Award 2019 (Deutsch-Französischen Journalistenpreis)
- Nominated for the DAFF Award of the German Academy for Television (Deutsche Akademie für Fernsehen) in the categories "Screenplay" and "VFX / Animation"
