= A Siege Diary =

- Блокадный дневник
- Directed by: Andrey Zaytsev
- Written by: Andrey Zaytsev
- Produced by: Olga Granina; Andrey Zaytsev
- Starring: Olga Ozollapinya; Sergey Dreyden; Andrey Shibarshin; Darya Rumyantseva; Alexandra Granina; Vasilina Makovtseva; Sonya Uritskaya; Olga Granina
- Cinematography: Irina Uralskaya
- Edited by: Andrey Zaytsev
- Production company: September Film Studio
- Distributed by: INSIDE DSTR
- Release dates: October 2020 (Moscow International Film Festival); September 8, 2021 (Russia)
- Running time: 118 minutes
- Country: Russia
- Language: Russian

A Siege Diary (Russian: Блокадный дневник, romanized: Blokadnyy dnevnik) is a 2020 Russian drama film directed by Andrey Zaytsev. The film is the winner of the Moscow International Film Festival.

== Plot ==
The film takes place at the beginning of the Great Patriotic War in snow-covered Leningrad. A young woman named Olga buried her husband, she thinks that she too did not have long to live and she went to her father to say goodbye to him.

== Cast ==
- Olga Ozollapinya as Olga
- Sergey Dreyden as Olga's Father
- Andrey Shibarshin as Lieutenant Gunther
- Darya Rumyantseva as Gretchen
- Alexandra Granina as Olga as a child
- Vasilina Makovtseva as Lyuba
- Sonya Uritskaya as ice cream girl
- Olga Granina as Olga's mother
- Aleksey Filimonov as gravedigger
- Polina Filonenko as evil vigilante

== Critical response ==
In her positive review, Ekaterina Barabash noted: "The film's main focus is the faces. There are quite a few of them, they follow one another, and the camera focuses on each character the heroine encounters". At the same time, Victor Matizen was dissatisfied with the film: "The inner world of the siege survivor is reduced to simple, incidental observations, containing nothing that hasn't been previously shown in numerous 'siege' films. Although there is some similarity: the similarities between Zaytsev's siege survivors and the zombies from George Romero's apocalyptic fantasies".

== See also ==
- Siege of Leningrad
