= LOOKSfilm =

German film production company

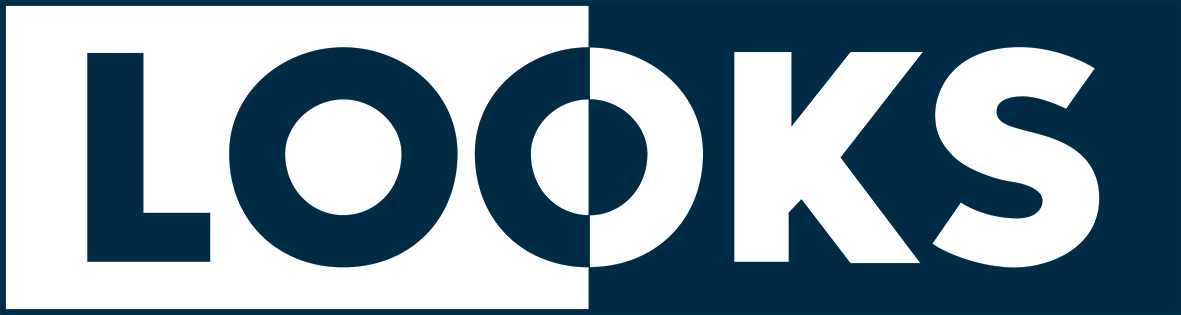
- Company type: GMbH
- Industry: Film
- Founded: 1995; 31 years ago
- Founder: Gunnar Dedio
- Headquarters: Leipzig, Berlin, Hamburg and Magdeburg, Germany
- Website: Official website

LOOKSfilm is a German film production company, based in Leipzig, Berlin, Hamburg and Magdeburg.

The company was founded in 1995 by Gunnar Dedio. It develops, produces and distributes series as well as documentary and feature films for the international market. LOOKSfilm possesses its own archives department, which researches and restores photo and film material for historical productions. Furthermore, LOOKSfilm operates as a music publisher and is the initiator of event productions.

== Productions ==
In 2004, for the 15th anniversary of the Fall of the Berlin Wall, LOOKSfilm produced the series Life Behind the Wall, which was awarded the Adolf-Grimme-Preis. Accompanied by archive material and newly developed amateur films, photos and documents, contemporary witnesses have their say. Their different perspectives and stories trace a personal image of the GDR.

The company co-produced Age of Uprising: The Legend of Michael Kohlhaas, starring Mads Mikkelsen and Bruno Ganz. Arnaud des Pallières' adaptation of the Kleist-Novella Michael Kohlhaas was nominated for the 2013 Palme d'Or at the Cannes Film Festival. In 2014, the film won the French César Award for Best Sound and Best Music.

Based on diaries and letters, the international co-production 14 – Diaries of the Great War (2014) retold the experiences of real people as dramas and interwoven these with archive material. 14 – Diaries of the Great War was the first production by LOOKSfilm for which Netflix acquired license rights. More LOOKSfilm productions and co-productions followed, such as: My Friend Rockefeller (2015), The Cuba Libre Story (2016), and Age of Tanks (2018). With Bobby Kennedy for President (2018), LOOKSfilm co-produced with Netflix directly, among others.

In 2017, LOOKSfilm produced the documentary film Hitler's Hollywood. The film, directed by Rüdiger Suchsland, examines the significance of German cinema during the Nazi era. Based on selected film clips, the film illustrates how the German film industry aimed at creating a second Hollywood. Between 1933 and 1945, the roughly 1,000 Nazi productions served not only as entertainment, but also as a tool for the indoctrination of the population.

Clash of Futures (2018), the continuation of 14 – Diaries of the Great War, recounts the interwar period in Europe on the basis of 13 fates. As of 2019, it is the company's largest international co-production, with over 20 international partners and channels.

== Filmography ==
- 2001: Hangman – Death has a face (theatrical documentary, directed by Jens Becker)
- 2003: Genesis II et l'homme créa la nature (documentary series, directed by Frédéric Lepage)
- 2003: Checkmate (documentary, awarded the Romy
- 2004: Life Behind the Wall (documentary series, won the Grimme-Preis in 2005)
- 2004: Monuments (documentary series, directed by Piotr Trzaskalski, Alice Nellis, Peter Kerekes, Ferenc Török and others)
- 2006: Life Under Napoleon (documentary series)
- 2007: Living with the Enemy (documentary series)
- 2007: Hitler & Mussolini (documentary)
- 2008: Life in East Prussia (documentary series)
- 2008: Hitler & Stalin (documentary)
- 2008: In Search of America (documentary series)
- 2008: Of Sharks and Men (documentary series, directed by Dirk Steffens)
- 2009: Comrade Couture (documentary)
- 2010: Molotow (documentary, directed by Ullrich Kasten)
- 2010: Life After the Wall (documentary series)
- 2010: La vie sauvage des animaux domestiques (documentary)
- 2010: Mein Germany (documentary)
- 2010: On the Road in Southern Africa (documentary series)
- 2010: Hans Zimmer – The Sound of Hollywood (documentary)
- 2011: Churchill's betrayal of Poland – The Mysterious Death of General Sikorski (documentary)
- 2011: Brick by Brick – The Making of the Iron Curtain (documentary)
- 2012: Hindenburg & Hitler (documentary, directed by Christoph Weinert)
- 2012: Lenin – The End of the Myth (documentary, directed by Ullrich Kasten)
- 2013: Michael Kohlhaas (feature film, directed by Arnaud des Pallières), awarded two Césars (for Best Music and Best Sound) at the 39th César Awards.
- 2013: Spies of Mississippi (documentary, directed by Dawn Porter)
- 2013: Michel Petrucciani – Body and Soul (documentary, directed by Michael Radford)
- 2013: Lyndon B. Johnson- Succeeding Kennedy (documentary)
- 2013: 1913: The Emperor's Last Dance (documentary)
- 2014: 14 – Diaries of the Great War (documentary drama series, directed by Jan Peter)
- 2014: Small Hands in a Big War (drama series for children, directed by Matthias Zirzow)
- 2014: Inside the War (3D documentary, directed by Niko Vialkowitsch)
- 2014: Annihilation (documentary series, directed by William Karel)
- 2015: Erich Mielke – Master of Fear (scenic documentary, directed by Jens Becker, Maarten van der Duin)
- 2016: The Cuba Libre Story (documentary drama series, director/written by: Emmanuel Amara, Kai Christiansen, Florian Dedio)
- 2016: My friend Rockefeller (documentary, directed/written by: Steffi Kammerer)
- 2016: A Gentle Creature (feature film, directed by: Sergei Loznitsa)
- 2017: Dreams of a New World (documentary drama series, directed by Kai Christiansen)
- 2017: Mademoiselle Paradis (feature film, directed by: Barbara Albert)
- 2018: Bobby Kennedy for President (documentary, directed by Dawn Porter)
- 2018: Clash of Futures (documentary drama series, directed by Jan Peter)
- 2018: Age of Iron (documentary series, directed by Philippe Bérenger, Henrike Sandner)
- 2019: Inside Europe (German version)
- 2019: The Cold War Story (documentary series, written & directed by Kai Christiansen, Matthias Schmidt)
- 2019: Countdown to 1961/1989 (documentary, directed by Henrike Sandner)
- 2019: Solidarnosc – How Solidarity Changed Europe (documentary, written & directed by Ania Szczepanska, with Agnieszka Holland)
- 2020: Colonia Dignidad (documentary series, written & directed by Annette Baumeister, Wilfried Huismann, won DAfF Award 2020 (Deutsche Akademie für Fernsehen), nominated for Grimme-Preis 2021)
- 2020: Frenemies: Putin and Trump (documentary, directed by Claire Walding)
- 2020: Afghanistan: The Wounded Land (directed by Marcel Mettelsiefen, Mayte Carrasco, won The Jane Mercer Researcher of the Year (FOCAL International Awards 2021), nominated for: Grimme-Preis 2021, Rose d'or 2020, Realscreen Awards 2021, The Buzzies 2020)
- 2020: The Pope and Hitler - Opening the secret files on Pius XII (documentary, written & directed by Lucio Mollica, Maria Perotti)
- 2020: I want my country Back (documentary feature, written & directed by Lucio Mollica, Mayte Carrasco, Marcel Mettelsiefen, History Film Festival: Best TV Film 2021, Audience Award 2021)
- 2020: 1870/71 - The Franco-Prussian War (documentary, written & directed by Hermann Pölking, Linn Sackarnd)
- 2020: Countdown to 1990 (documentary, written & directed by Henrike Sandner)
- 2020: Expulsion. Odsun - The Sudetenland (documentary, directed by Matthias Schmidt, German-Czech Journalist Award 2021)
- 2021: A War on Trial - Justice for Ex-Yugoslavia (documentary, written & directed by Lucio Mollica, Nominated for DAfF Award 2021 (Deutsche Akademie für Fernsehen),Grimme-Preis 2022)
- 2021: The Pipeline of the Century - How Soviet Natural Gas Came to the West (documentary, written & directed by Matthias Schmidt)
- 2021: Strawalde. A Life in Pictures (documentary feature, written & directed by Johannes Blume)
- 2021: A Sinister Sect: Colonia Dignidad (Netflix documentary series, written & directed by Wilfried Huismann, Annette Baumeister)
- 2021: Seapower - The History of Warships (documentary series, written & directed by Riley Dedio, Michaela McMahon, Marie Perrin, Anna Schwarz)
- 2021: War in Europe – Drama in Ukraine (documentary, written & directed by Claire Walding)
- 2021: Dig Deeper: The Disappearance of Birgit Meier (Netflix documentary series, written & directed by Nicolas Steiner)
- 2022: Queen Elizabeth II - The Fateful Years (documentary, written & directed by Claire Walding)
- 2022: Zelenskyj - A President at War (documentary, directed by Dirk Schneider, Claudia Nagel)
- 2022: The Natural History Of Destruction (documentary, written & directed by Sergei Loznitsa, Festival de Cannes 2022 official selection)
- 2022: Terror at the Games – The Munich Massacre (documentary series, written & directed by Bence Máté, Lucio Mollica)
- 2022: Merkel (documentary, written & directed by Eva Weber, Telluride Film Festival 2022 (premiere), International Documentary Film Festival Amsterdam 2022, with Hillary Clinton, Tony Blair)
- 2023: Ukrainian Storybox - Voices of War (documentarý, written & directed by David Belton)
- 2023: The Duel - Zelensky vs. Putin (documentary, written & directed by Claire Walding)
- 2023: Chernobyl - Utopia in Flames (documentary, written & directed by Dirk Schneider, Ariane Riecker)
- 2023: King Charles III - Coming of Age (documentary, written & directed by Claire Walding)
- 2023: Working for the Enemy - Forced Labour in the Third Reich (documentary, written & directed by Matthias Schmidt)
- 2023: My Dream. My Story (series, directed by Marco Gadge, Second Prize at Prix Jeunesse International 2024, nominated for Goldener Spatz 2024)
- 2023: John F. Kennedy - The Man and the Myth (documentary series, written & directed by Tamara Erde)
- 2023-2024: Der Fall (YouTube series for funk, with Lydia Benecke, authors: Riley Dedio, Knut Holburg, Ella Luz, Matthias Hambsch, Johanna Hesselbarth, Vera Drude)
- 2024: A Nation Denied - Ukraine's Battle for History (documentary, written & directed by Andreas Fauser, Dirk Schneider)
- 2024: Trotz und Treue - Das Phänomen Sarah Wagenknecht (documentary, directed by Henrike Sandner)
- 2024: Angela Merkel - Schicksalsjahre einer Kanzlerin (documentary, written & directed by Tim Evers, with Annegret Kramp-Karrenbauer, Thomas de Maizière, Christoph Dieckmann, Marina Weisband, Tilo Jung)
- 2024: HARRY - Royalty and Beyond (documentary, written & directed by Claire Walding, Andreas Fauser)
- 2024: Female Power - Europe's Strong Women (documentary, written & directed by Claire Walding, with Alice Bah Kuhnke, Christine Lagarde)
- 2024: MAO (documentary, written & directed by Annette Baumeister, Paul Wiederhold)
- 2024: A World Divided (documentary drama series, directed by Olga Chajdas, Frank Devos, with Delia Mayer, Lara Mandoki)
- 2024: Warum verbrannte Oury Jalloh? (written & directed by Bence Máté, Anna Herbst)

== Awards ==
- 2025: three nominations for the Grimme-Preis 2025 (für A World Divided, My Dream. My Story, Warum verbrannte Oury Jalloh?)
- 2024: Prix Jeunesse (for My Dream. My Story)
- 2022: nominated for the Grimme-Preis 2022 (for A War on Trial. Justice for Ex-Yugoslavia)
- 2021: nominated for the Deutsche Akademie für Fernsehen Award (for A War on Trial. Justice for Ex-Yugoslavia)
- 2021: German-Czech Journalist Award (for Expulsion. Odsun. The Sudetenland)
- 2021: The Jane Mercer Researcher of the Year Award - FOCAL International Awards (for Afghanistan. The Wounded Land)
- 2021: Grimme-Preis 2021 (for Afghanistan.The Wounded Land)
- 2021: nominated for Grimme-Preis 2021 (for A Sinister Sect: Colonia Dignidad)
- 2021: nominated for The Banff (Banff World Media Festival) Rockie Award 2021 (for Afghanistan.The Wounded Land)
- 2020: nominated for Realscreen Awards 2021 (for Afghanistan.The Wounded Land)
- 2020: nominated for The Rose d’Or Award (for Afghanistan.The Wounded Land)
- 2020: nominated for The Buzzies – by WCSFP (for Afghanistan.The Wounded Land)
- 2020: Deutsche Akademie für Fernsehen Award (for A Sinister Sect: Colonia Dignidad)
- 2020 Taiwan International Children's Film Festival TICFF Award, categorv TV/Web Program (for Kids of Courage)
- 2020: Prix Jeunesse (for Kids of Courage)
- 2019: nominated for International Emmy Kids Awards (for Kids of Courage)
- 2019: nominated for Japan Prize (NHK) (for Kids of Courage)
- 2019: Der weiße Elefant (for Kids of Courage)
- 2019: Civis Media Prize in the category "Entertainment (fictional)" (for Clash of Futures)
- 2019: nominated for Banff World Media Festival Rockie Awards (for Kids of Courage)
- 2019: nominated for Grimme-Preis (for Clash of Futures)
- 2015: Prix Italia, Special Mention for International TV Coproduction (for 14 – Diaries of the Great War)
- 2014: nominated for German Television Award (for 14 – Diaries of the Great War)
- 2014: nominated for Japan Prize (International Contest for Educational Media) in the category "Continuing Education" (for 14 – Diaries of the Great War)
- 2014: nominated for Japan Prize (International Contest for Educational Media) in the category "Youth" (for Small Hands in a Big War)
- 2005: Grimme-Preis (for Life Behind the Wall)
- 2003: Romy TV-Award (for Checkmate – The Superpowers Behind the Rumanian Revolution)
- 2000: Axel-Springer-Preis (for Fit for Jesus)
