= Zelensky: A President in War =

2022 German documentary film

- Selenskyj: Ein Präsident im Krieg
- Directed by: Claudia Nagel, Dirk Schneider
- Starring: Volodymyr Zelenskyy (archival footage and interviews)
- Release date: 2022 (Germany)
- Country: Germany
- Language: German

Zelensky: A President in War or in German Selenskyj: Ein Präsident im Krieg is a 2022 German documentary film directed by Claudia Nagel and Dirk Schneider. The film follows Volodymyr Zelenskyy from his early life to his present-day occupation as the President of Ukraine. The film focuses on Zelenskyy's quick rise to power in the political world, coming from a former comedian who jokingly played the part of the Ukrainian President in a TV show, to becoming the actual President of Ukraine.

== Synopsis ==
The film begins with a pre-invasion interview of Zelenskyy in May 2021. Zelenskyy talks about how there will be no war in Ukraine without it leading to a potential third World War and perhaps millions of people dying. From there, the film explores Zelenskyy's life before politics and how it shaped him into becoming a man. From his family life to his early work as a comedian, the film explores how these experiences made Zelenskyy the person he is today. The film dives into how Zelenskyy soon became an overnight sensation. The film then explores Zelenskyy's occupational shift from comedian to politician and how that has affected him. Next, the film jumps into the future, just before the start of the war. Zelenskyy's transition from a somewhat unknown figure that was losing support at home to the hero of the Ukrainian people is showcased. The last 10–15 minutes of the film shows Zelenskyy's determination to continue to fight and hold off the Russians no matter the cost. Towards the end of the movie, pictures of the evacuation as well as images of the current situation of Ukraine are shown. At the very end of the film, two children are seen riding their bikes together through a Ukraine that seems very distant from the war-torn Eastern part of the country.

== Production ==
The film crew relied on archival footage to complete the documentary. This includes two interviews with President Volodymyr Zelenskyy, one before the war and one once the war had started. The film also extensively uses interviews by experts in specific geopolitical fields. These include Eastern Europe expert Marieluise Beck, political scientist Orysia Lutsevych from Chatham House, London, and Ukrainian activist and lawyer Mykhailo Zhernakov to explain Zelenskyy's decisions in the war as well as his personal traits that led him to this position. The film was made in March 2022, only a month after the war began. Production was quick but a plan to develop such a film relating to the war in Ukraine had already been in development for quite some time.
