= Gunnar Dedio =

German film producer and author

Gunnar Dedio (born November 16, 1969, in Rostock, Germany) is a German film producer and media entrepreneur. He is the founder and managing director of the film production company LOOKSfilm.

== Life ==
In 1995, Gunnar Dedio founded the media production company LOOKSfilm. Parallel to his work as a producer and managing director, he completed executive training at INSEAD, the International Institute for Management Development (IMD), and the MIT Sloan School of Management. At INSEAD he studied with Manfred F.R. Kets de Vries, Roger Lehman and Erik van de Loo and in 2016, he received the Executive Master in Consulting and Coaching for Change (EMCCC Wave 21).

== Producer ==
Dedio became internationally known with the 10-part documentary series Life Behind the Wall (2004), for which he received the Adolf-Grimme-Preis in 2005.

In 2011, Dedio produced the documentary drama series 14 - Diaries of the Great War (2014), developed by him and director Jan Peter. The award-winning series was first aired on ARTE and ARD, followed by other international channels. In the US, 14 - Diaries of the Great War was shown on Netflix.

The Cuba Libre Story (2016), Age of Tanks (2017), and Bobby Kennedy for President (2018) are other productions and co-productions by Dedio, in collaboration with Netflix.

Clash of Futures (2018), the continuation of 14 – Diaries of the Great War, was also developed by Dedio and Jan Peter and produced by LOOKSfilm. The series about the interwar period was created in collaboration with 23 international channels and was aired on ARTE in September 2018.

Since 2010, Dedio has also produced feature films such as the multi-award-winning co-productions Age of Uprising: The Legend of Michael Kohlhaas (2013) with Mads Mikkelsen and Bruno Ganz, Mademoiselle Paradis (2017) with Maria Dragus and Devid Striesow and A Gentle Creature (Krotkaya, 2017) by Sergei Loznitsa.

== Social commitment ==
Together with the AWO Rostock, Prof. Henning Wode and the Institut français, Dedio founded the bilingual kindergarten Rappelkiste in 1995, based on the principle of immersion, with the aim of promoting multilingualism and alternative perspectives from an early age.

From 1998 - 2008 Dedio was involved in development cooperation in cooperation with GTZ and DED. On behalf of the GTZ, Dedio produced a documentary in Peru about solutions in the field of drinking water supply. In cooperation with GTZ in Botswana, Dedio led a multi-year training program for media designers in Gaborone. In cooperation with DED, Dedio conducted a social marketing campaign for HIV awareness in Tanzania using locally produced TV spots.

== Filmography ==
- 2001: Hangman - Death has a face (theatrical documentary, directed by Jens Becker)
- 2003: Genesis II et l'homme créa la nature (documentary series, directed by Frédéric Lepage)
- 2003: Checkmate (documentary, awarded the Romy
- 2004: Life Behind the Wall (documentary series, won the Grimme-Preis in 2005)
- 2004: Monuments (documentary series, directed by Piotr Trzaskalski, Alice Nellis, Peter Kerekes, Ferenc Török and others)
- 2006: Life Under Napoleon (documentary series)
- 2007: Living with the Enemy (documentary series)
- 2007: Hitler & Mussolini (documentary)
- 2008: Life in East Prussia (documentary series)
- 2008: Hitler & Stalin (documentary)
- 2008: In Search of America (documentary series)
- 2008: Of Sharks and Men (documentary series, directed by Dirk Steffens)
- 2009: Comrade Couture (documentary)
- 2010: Molotow (documentary, directed by Ullrich Kasten)
- 2010: Life After the Wall (documentary series)
- 2010: La vie sauvage des animaux domestiques (documentary)
- 2010: Mein Germany (documentary)
- 2010: On the Road in Southern Africa (documentary series)
- 2010: Hans Zimmer - The sound of Hollywood (documentary)
- 2011: Churchill's betrayal of Poland - The mysterious death of General Sikorski (documentary)
- 2011: Brick by Brick - The Making of the Iron Curtain (documentary)
- 2012: Hindenburg & Hitler (documentary, directed by Christoph Weinert)
- 2012: Lenin - The End of the Myth (documentary, directed by Ullrich Kasten)
- 2013: Michael Kohlhaas (feature film, directed by Arnaud des Pallières), awarded two Césars (for Best Music and Best Sound) at the 39th César Awards.
- 2013: Spies of Mississippi (documentary, directed by Dawn Porter (filmmaker))
- 2013: Michel Petrucciani – Body and Soul (documentary, directed by Michael Radford)
- 2013: Lyndon B. Johnson- Succeeding Kennedy (documentary)
- 2013: 1913: The Emperor's Last Dance (documentary)
- 2014: 14 - Diaries of the Great War (documentary drama series, directed by Jan Peter)
- 2014: Small Hands in a Big War (drama series for children, directed by Matthias Zirzow)
- 2014: Inside the War (3D documentary, directed by Niko Vialkowitsch)
- 2014: Annihilation (documentary series, directed by William Karel)
- 2015: Erich Mielke - Master of Fear (scenic documentary, directed by Jens Becker, Maarten van der Duin)
- 2016: The Cuba Libre Story (documentary drama series, director/written by: Emmanuel Amara, Kai Christiansen, Florian Dedio)
- 2016: My friend Rockefeller (documentary, directed/written by: Steffi Kammerer)
- 2016: A Gentle Creature (feature film, directed by: Sergei Loznitsa)
- 2017: Dreams of a New World (documentary drama series, directed by Kai Christiansen)
- 2017: Mademoiselle Paradis (feature film, directed by: Barbara Albert)
- 2018: Bobby Kennedy for President (documentary, directed by Dawn Porter)
- 2018: Clash of Futures (documentary drama series, directed by Jan Peter)

== Books ==
- with Jens Becker: Die letzten Henker. Das Neue Berlin, Berlin 2002, ISBN 978-3-360-00969-2.
- with Florian Dedio: The Great War Diaries, BBC Books, 2014, ISBN 978-1849906746.

== Awards (selection) ==
- 2019: nominated for Grimme-Preis (for Clash of Futures)
- 2018: Goldener Spatz (for Kids of Courage)
- 2015: Prix Italia, Special Mention for International TV Coproduction (for 14 - Diaries of the Great War)
- 2014: Robert-Geisendörfer-Preis (for 14 - Diaries of the Great War)
- 2014: nominated for Deutscher Fernsehpreis (for 14 - Diaries of the Great War)
- 2014: nominated for Japan Prize (for 14 - Diaries of the Great War)
- 2014: nominated for Japan Prize (for Small Hands in a Big War)
- 2005: Grimme-Preis (for Life Behind the Wall)
- 2004: Hans-Klein-Medienpreis (for Life Behind the Wall)
- 2003: Romy TV-Award (for Checkmate - The superpowers behind the Rumanian revolution)
- 2000: Axel-Springer-Preis (for Fit for Jesus)
