= Caroline Cooper =

Caroline Cooper may refer to:

- Caroline Cooper (Hollyoaks), a character from the soap opera Hollyoaks
- Caroline Ethel Cooper (1871–1961), Australian musician and diarist
