= Scott Froschauer =

American artist (1968–2026)

- Born: October 26, 1968; Chicago, Illinois, U.S.
- Died: September 30, 2026 (aged 57)
- Education: Syracuse University (BA)
- Style: Multimedia, fabrication
- Movement: Public art
- Spouse: Kymber Blake (m. 2010)
- Website: scottfroschauer.com

Scott Paulette Froschauer (October 26, 1968 – September 30, 2026) was an American artist, sculptor and key grip. He was primarily known for his public art installations, especially those that modified traditional traffic signs to spread optimism, a series entitled The Word on the Street. Highly regarded for his large-scale art installations at Burning Man, Froschauer's work was featured at the Smithsonian American Art Museum as part of the 2018 No Spectators exhibition.

== Early life and education ==
Scott Froschauer was born and raised in Chicago, Illinois. He graduated from Staples High School in Westport, Connecticut, in 1988. He went on to Syracuse University, where he graduated with a degree in theoretical linguistics, before relocating to Los Angeles in 1994.

== Career ==
Froschauer initially established himself as a grip in the film industry, working on films including The Lost World: Jurassic Park (1997) and television series such as Bobby Kennedy for President (2018).

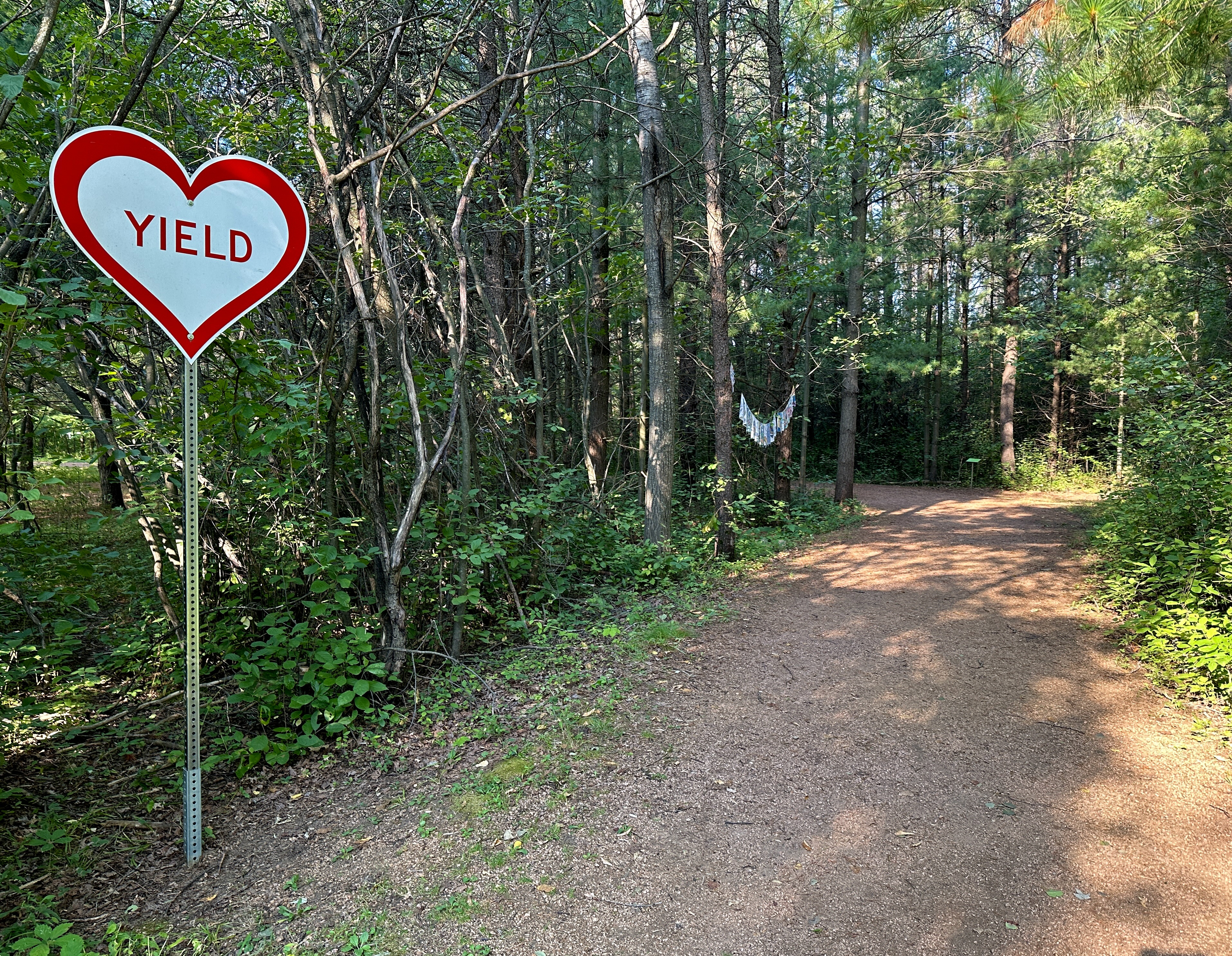

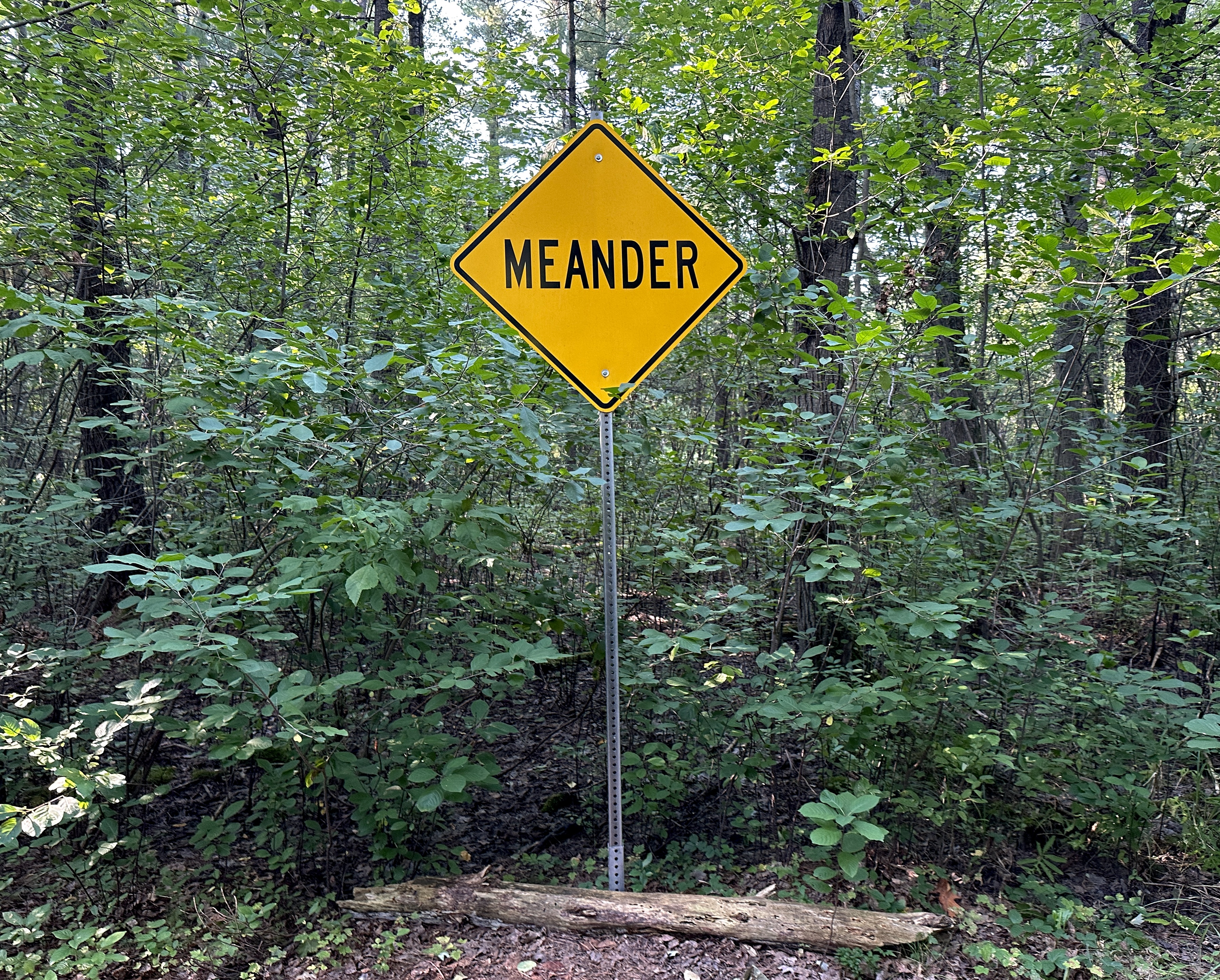

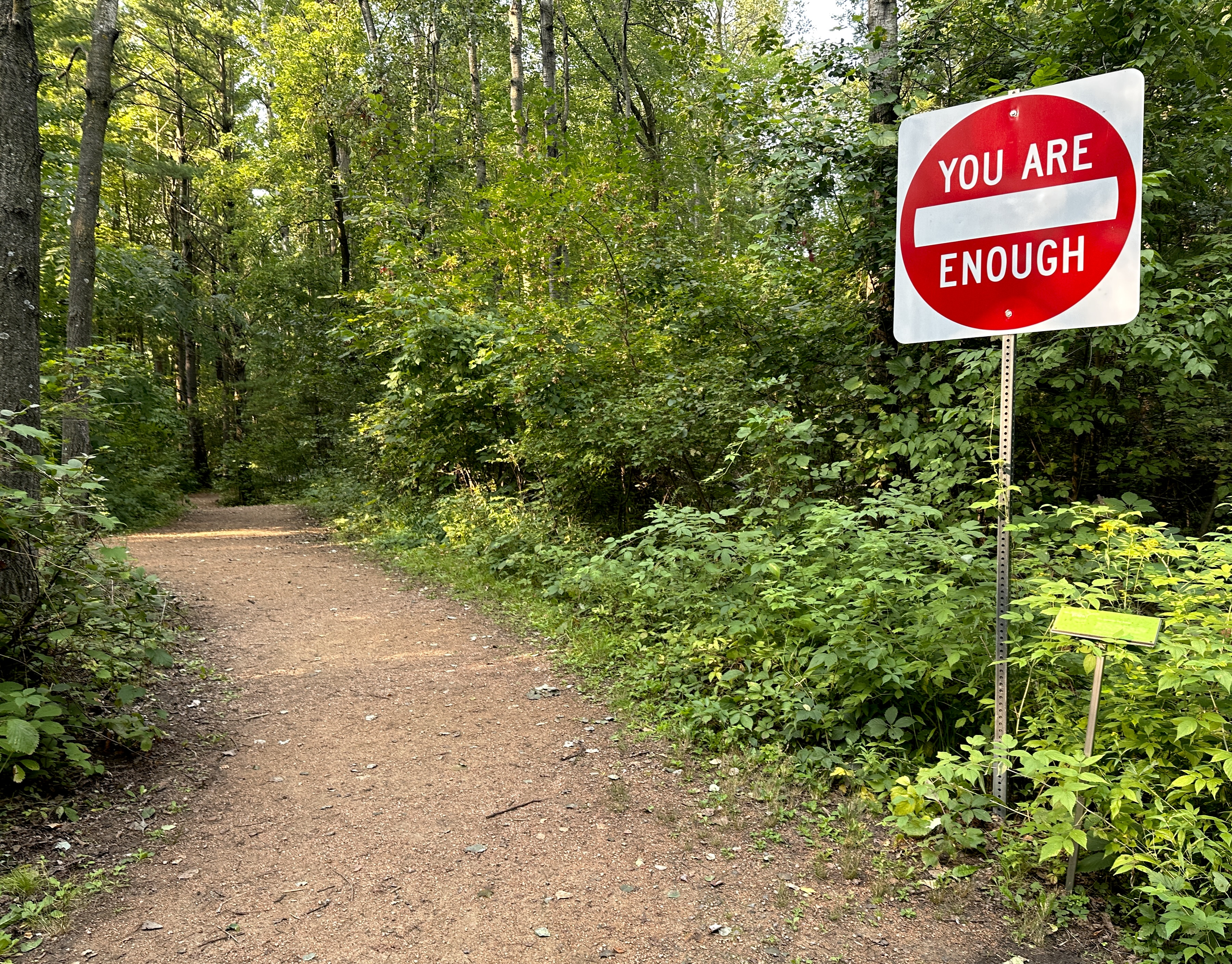
Street sign art by Scott Froschauer

He was known for creating fake street signs that echo messages of peace and happiness, which were welcomed by cities and communities to be viewed by the public. His public art installations have been installed to be viewed for free in Los Angeles, West Hollywood, Glendale, Laguna Beach, Palm Springs, Houston, and DeLand, Florida.

== Personal life and death ==
Froschauer was married to Kymber Blake. He died in his sleep on September 30, 2026, at the age of 56.

== Filmography ==
Year	Title	Role	Notes
1995	The Tin Soldier	grip	TV movie
1995	Dillinger and Capone	grip	
1995	Stripteaser	grip	
1995	Suspect Device	key grip	TV movie
1995	Sawbones	electrician	TV movie
1995	Black Scorpion	grip	TV movie
1995	Donor Unknown	grip	TV movie; as Scott Froschouer
1996	Flipping	dolly grip	as Scott Freschauer
1996	Black Rose of Harlem	key grip	
1996	The Dentist	additional grip	
1996	Curdled	key grip: Los Angeles	
1996	Uncle Sam	dolly grip	
1996	Head of the Family	best boy grip	as Scott Froscharer
1996	The Cherokee Kid	grip	TV movie
1996	Alone in the Woods	best boy grip	
1997	The Beneficiary	dolly grip	TV movie
1997	The House of Yes	grip	as Scott Froschover
1997	Dog Watch	dolly grip	
1997	The Lost World: Jurassic Park	grip	
1997	The Shadow Men	grip	
1997	Against the Law	dolly grip / key grip	
1998	Permanent Midnight	dolly grip	as Scott Froschouer
1998	The Wacky Adventures of Ronald McDonald: Scared Silly	company grip / dolly grip: live action	as Scott Froschaver
2000	Le Boo	key grip	music video
2004	Hollywood's Creepiest Creatures	key grip: Elvira host wrap crew	TV movie
2006	Rock n' Roll Fantasy Camp	best boy grip	TV special; as Scott Froschaur
2006	Pablo Francisco: Ouch! Live from San Jose	key grip	TV special
2009	Crash Course	key grip	TV series, one episode
2011	Scream Awards 2011	key grip	TV special
2013	Necessary Evil: Super-Villains of DC Comics	grip	uncredited
2011–2014	Hell's Kitchen (American TV series)	key grip / grip	TV series, 31 episodes
2015	Tap World	gaffer	
2016	The Eighties	gaffer	TV miniseries, 7 episodes
2017	The Dark Side of the Sun	assistant camera	TV movie
2018	Ugly Delicious	grip	TV series, 2 episodes
2018	Bobby Kennedy for President	gaffer	TV miniseries, 4 episodes
2019	Lorena	gaffer	TV miniseries, 3 episodes
2021	Lincoln: Divided We Stand	grip	TV miniseries, 3 episodes
2023	American Manhunt: The Boston Marathon Bombing	gaffer	TV miniseries, 3 episodes
2026	#Skyking	grip	
