= Het verhaal van Nederland =

2016 Dutch-language television series

- Genre: Documentary, drama, historical
- Starring: Daan Schuurmans
- Country of origin: Netherlands
- Original language: Dutch
- No. of seasons: 1
- No. of episodes: 10

Production
- Production companies: Tuvalu Media; Pupkin Film NTR

Original release
- Network: NPO 1
- Release: February 2 – April 12, 2022

Het verhaal van Nederland is a Dutch ten-part historical docudrama series broadcast by NTR that aired on NPO 1 from February 2, 2022, to April 13, 2022. Actor Daan Schuurmans has the role of narrator and presenter. The series is based on the Danish docudrama Historien om Danmark (2017) produced by Danmarks Radio and starring actor Lars Mikkelsen as the narrator.

Screenwriter Maarten van der Duin wrote the scripts for all episodes. Journalist Florence Tonk is the author of the book based on the series.

== Plot ==
Ten periods from Dutch history are highlighted in the series and various events are brought to life by being acted out by actors. In his role as narrator, Schuurmans is on site and only he breaks through the fourth wall, providing the viewer with an explanation. As a presenter, he walks in historically important places in the here and now to provide additional explanations. The dramatized scenes are interspersed with commentaries provided by historians and other experts. Many of the actors belong to re-enactment companies, whose specialty is to depict historical events or to provide as faithful a representation as possible of people of a particular era.

== Cast ==
Actor	Role
Daan Schuurmans	Himself (presenter and narrator)
Jaap Hogendoorn	Jan Pieterszoon Koppestok
Sonia Eijken	Ava
Siawaash Cyrroes	Damir
Arabi Ghibeh	Zilan
Abbie Chalgoum	Novak
Bahareh Borzue	Sita
Tim Olivier Somer	Brandolf
Jennifer Welts	Bruna
Ellie de Lange	Gundrun
Florence Vos Weeda	Dana
Joost Koning	Diemar
Roan ten Cate	Gernand
Manouk Pluis	Anne-Marie Huybrechts

== Episodes ==
Episode	Title	Date	Viewers
1.	Jagers en boeren	2 February 2022	1.667.000
2.	Romeinen en Bataven	9 February 2022	2.021.000
3.	Friezen en Franken	16 February 2022	1.777.000
4.	Ridders en graven	23 February 2022	1.471.000
5.	Pestlijders en predikanten	2 March 2022	1.736.000
6.	Geuzen en papen	9 March 2022	1.583.000
7.	Kapers en kooplui	23 March 2022	1.533.000
8.	Patriotten en Prinsgezinden	30 March 2022	1.460.000
9.	Pioniers en paupers	6 April 2022	1.666.000
10.	Bevrijders en bezetters	13 April 2022	1.691.000
