= Damals in der DDR =

- Country of origin: Germany
- No. of episodes: 10 in 3 sets

Production
- Running time: 52 minutes per episode

Original release
- Release: 2004

Damals in der DDR (Life Behind the Wall) is a ten part German documentary television series which was awarded the Adolf Grimme Prize in 2005.

It was produced by MDR, WDR, and Gunnar Dedio of the production firm LOOKSfilm. The series uses contemporary accounts to report on life in the German Democratic Republic (East Germany) during 1945–1990.

The title song for the series was sung by Udo Lindenberg. On 28 July 2006, the documentary series became available on DVD.

Episode Titles

1. Dawn amongst the Ruins.
2. New beginnings in Russian.
3. Utopia behind Walls.
4. Plans and Bankruptcy.
5. Party without the People.
6. Republic on the brink of disaster.
7. A State at its end.
8. Freedom without borders.
9. Deutsche Marks for everyone.
10. Unified for ever.

Extra episode: The People under Control (2007)

== See also ==
- List of German television series
