= The Wizard of the Emerald City (2024 film) =

- Theatrical release poster
- Directed by: Igor Voloshin
- Written by: Timofei Dekin; Roman Nepomnyashchiy; Alexander Volkov (writer)
- Based on: The Wizard of the Emerald City by Alexander Volkov (writer); The Wonderful Wizard of Oz by Frank Baum
- Produced by: Petr Anurov (ru); Vadim Vereshchagin; Aleksandr Gorokhov; Leonid Vereshchagin (ru); Nikita Mikhalkov; Grigory Stoyalov; Aleksandr Zharov; Darya Fardzinova; Marina Gurtovaya
- Starring: Ekaterina Chervova; Yuri Kolokolnikov; Yevgeny Chumak; Artur Vakha; Svetlana Khodchenkova; Vasilina Makovtseva; Aleksandra Bogdanova; Dmitry Chebotaryov (ru); Sergey Epishev; Egor Koreshkov; Sofia Lebedeva
- Cinematography: Mikhail Milashin
- Music by: Nikolay Rostov
- Production companies: Central Partnership Productions; Kinoslovo; Studio TriTe; CGF Films; Cinema Fund; Watch movies by "Pushkin Map"; Likee; Europa Plus
- Distributed by: Central Partnership
- Release dates: December 18, 2024 (Moscow); January 1, 2025 (Russia)
- Running time: 104 minutes
- Country: Russia
- Language: Russian
- Budget: ₽900 million
- Box office: ₽3.338 billion; $38.1 million

The Wizard of the Emerald City (Russian: Волшебник Изумрудного города. Дорога из жёлтого кирпича, lit. 'The Wizard of the Emerald City. The Yellow Brick Road', titled onscreen as The Wizard of the Emerald City. Part I) is a 2024 Russian live-action fairy tale fantasy film directed by Igor Voloshin, produced by Central Partnership in partnership with Petr Anurov's Kinoslovo company.

The film is a screen adaptation of the 1939 children's novel of the same name by the Soviet writer Alexander Melentyevich Volkov, based on a reworking of L. Frank Baum's 1900 novel The Wonderful Wizard of Oz. Young stars Ekaterina Chervova in her first film role as Ellie Smith, along with her dog Totoshka. The film also stars Yuri Kolokolnikov as the Tin Woodman, Yevgeny Chumak as the Scarecrow, Artur Vakha voiced the Cowardly Lion, who was completely computer-generated imagery, and Svetlana Khodchenkova as the evil sorceress Bastinda.

The Wizard of the Emerald City premiered at the Karo 11 October at Arbat Square in Moscow on December 18, 2024, and was theatrically released in Russia on January 1, 2025. The film earned more than 3 billion rubles at the box office.

The sequel, The Wizard of the Emerald City. Part II, is scheduled for 2027.

== Premise ==
The film tells the story of a girl named Ellie Smith, who lives in a distant city. Suddenly, an evil witch named Gingema conjured a hurricane that carried the girl and her dog to the land of Munchkins, where she meets the Scarecrow, the Tin Woodman and the Cowardly Lion, with whom she must go to the Emerald City to find the Wizard who can fulfill their dreams.

== Cast ==
- Ekaterina Chervova as Ellie (inspired by Dorothy Gale)
- Udzher the Dog as Totoshka (inspired by Toto)
- Yuri Kolokolnikov as the Iron Lumberjack (inspired by the Tin Woodman)
- Yevgeny Chumak as the Bogeyman (inspired by the Scarecrow)
- Svetlana Khodchenkova as Bastinda (inspired by the Wicked Witch of the West)
- Vasilina Makovtseva as Gingema (inspired by the Wicked Witch of the East)
- Aleksandra Bogdanova as Villina (inspired by the Good Witch of the North)
- Dmitry Chebotaryov as Urfin Jus
- Sergey Epishev as the Ogre
- Egor Koreshkov as Ellie's father
- Sofia Lebedeva as Ellie's mother

Voice cast

- Denis Vlasenko as Totoshka (voice acting)
- Artur Vakha as the Cowardly Lion
- Yana Sekste as Ramina, Queen of the Field Mice

Other cast members

- Nadezhda Kuvshinova as a Munchkin woman
- Yulia Khramtsova as a Munchkin woman
- Sofia Weisberg as a Munchkin woman
- Maria Zhidkova as a Munchkin woman
- Aleksandr Kalashnikov as a Munchkin man
- Aleksandr Astakhov as a Winkie boy
- Roman Shpagin as a Winkie man
- Maria Dudnik as a Winkie woman
- Andrey Sidorov as a Winkie man, Bastinda's servant
- Artem Zhukov as a Winkie man

== Production ==
The production of the film began back in April 2022, when the project was presented to senior officials at the Russian Minister of Culture, with the aim of getting them interested in financing the film, and the project received government funding.

The film The Wizard of the Emerald City. The Yellow Brick Road is being carried out by four major Russian film companies: Nikita Mikhalkov's Studio TriTe, Kinoslovo, CGF (a visual effects studio) and Central Partnership Productions (part of Gazprom-Media). The project is being implemented with the support of the Russian Cinema Fund.

=== Casting ===
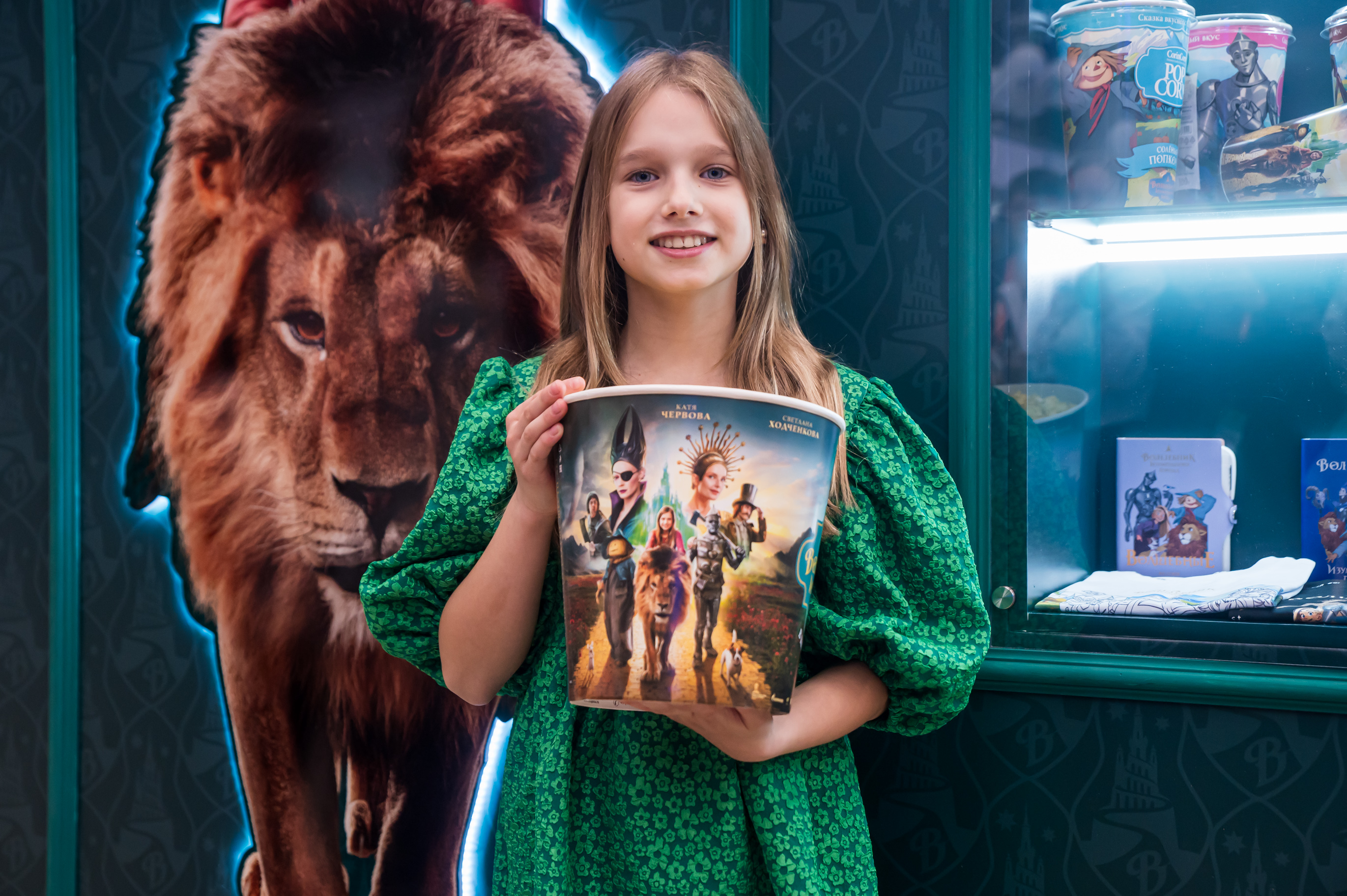
Ekaterina Chervova at the 25th anniversary of the St. Petersburg International Content Forum 2024.

The Jack Russell Terrier named Udzher found a common language with the girl. But his voice was "given" to him by Denis Vlasenko (the film Matthew Passion).

One of the most difficult was the casting for the role of the Tin Woodman, but in the end the team decided to settle on the candidacy of Yuri Kolokolnikov. There were also difficulties with the Lion, but already of a technical nature: this character was created entirely with the help of computer technology. However, Artur Vakha conveyed his facial expressions, character and movements.

=== Filming ===
Principal photography started in June 2023 and ended in mid-July. The film crew carried out the shooting process in the Republic of Dagestan, on the road from Makhachkala to Buynaksk, Moscow and the region of Moscow Oblast.

In Buynaksk, on the green plains of the Buynaksky District, Ellie and her friends were filming their way through a poppy field.

== Release ==
The premiere was scheduled for December 26, 2024, but was later postponed to January 1, 2025.

=== Theatrical ===
The Wizard of the Emerald City had its world premiere at their “Karo 11 October” cinema center on New Arbat Avenue in Moscow on December 18, 2024, and was theatrically released by Central Partnership in the Russian Federation on January 1, 2025.

== Reception ==
=== Critical response ===
The film received mixed reviews in the Russian press. It was given restrained praise by the authors of the publications KinoPoisk ("The finale, flavored with a solid battle scene on a dilapidated bridge, is capable of touching even the most callous audience"), Film.ru ("The infectious chemistry and organic charm of the quartet of friends and Ellie Smith become an antidote to boomer grumbling"), assessed skeptically by the publications Kommersant ("Beautiful pictures replace each other on the screen, but the characters move from one to another completely mechanically"), Mir Fantastiki ("A film for viewers who are not too picky, for whom colorful pictures and a good message will be enough"), and was crushed by the publications Gazeta.Ru ("Voloshin's film naturally turns out to be an extremely boring spectacle. And what's worse, it's incredibly stuffy").

The Afisha publication compared the film with another Russian fantasy film that came out during the same holidays, Finist. The First Warrior (2024), and chose Finist. Both positive and negative reviews noted the high quality of the special effects, the fact that the film is intended exclusively for children, and often criticized the fact that only the first half of the book's plot was included in the film.

== Sequel ==
The premiere of the second part of the film, entitled The Wizard of the Emerald City. The Great and Terrible (onscreen as The Wizard of the Emerald City. Part II), will take place on January 1, 2027.
