= A Gentle Creature (2017 film) =

2017 film by Sergei Loznitsa

- Film poster
- Directed by: Sergei Loznitsa
- Written by: Sergei Loznitsa
- Produced by: Marianne Slot; Gunnar Dedio
- Starring: Vasilina Makovtseva; Valeriu Andriuta; Sergei Kolesov; Dmitry Bykovsky
- Cinematography: Oleg Mutu
- Edited by: Danielius Kokanauskis
- Production companies: Slot Machine; Arte France Cinéma; Graniet Film BV; LOOKSfilm; Solar Media Entertainment; Studio Uljana Kim; Wild at Art
- Release date: 25 May 2017 (Cannes)
- Running time: 143 minutes
- Countries: France; Ukraine; Germany; Latvia; Lithuania; Netherlands; Russia
- Language: Russian

A Gentle Creature (version in Russian: «Кро́ткая», romanized: Krotkaya, version in Ukrainian: «Лагідна», romanized: Lagidna, version in French: Une femme douce, version in German: Die Sanfte) is a 2017 drama film directed by Sergei Loznitsa. The film was a co-production between companies in France, Germany, the Netherlands, Russia, Latvia, Ukraine and Lithuania. It was selected to compete for the Palme d'Or in the main competition section at the 2017 Cannes Film Festival. The film is inspired by the 1876 short story of the same name by Fyodor Dostoyevsky.

== Plot ==
A woman lives alone on the outskirts of a village in Russia. One day she receives a parcel she had sent to her incarcerated husband, marked 'return to sender'. Shocked and confused, the woman has no choice but to travel to the prison in a remote region of the country in search of an explanation. So begins the story of a battle against this impenetrable fortress, the prison where the forces of social evil are constantly at work. Braving violence and humiliation, in the face of all opposition, our protagonist embarks on a blind quest for justice.

== Cast ==
- Vasilina Makovtseva
- Sergei Kolesov
- Dimitry Bykovsky
- Lia Akhedzhakova
- Vadim Dubovsky
- Roza Hajrullina
- Sergey Fedorov
- Marina Kleshcheva
- Alisa Kravtsova
- Sergei Russkin
- Alexander Zamuraev
- Svetlana Kolesova
- Valeriu Andriuta
- Nikolay Kolyada
- Konstantin Itunin
- Boris Kamorzin
- Anton Makushin
- Sergei Koshonin
- Viktor Nemets
- Elena Netesina

== Production ==
The film was produced by Marianne Slot and Carine Leblanc for Slot Machine (France). Co producers are Valentina Mikhaleva, Galina Sementseva, Lev Karakhan, Gunnar Dedio, Uljana Kim, Peter Warnier, Marc van Warmerdam and Serge Lanrenyuk. A Gentle Creature was produced in coproduction with Arte France Cinéma, GP cinema company (Russia), LOOKSfilm (Germany), Studio Uljana Kim (Lithuania), Wild at Art & Graniet Film (The Netherlands), Solar Media Entertainment (Ukraine), in association with Wild Bunch, Haut et Court, Potemkine Films, Atoms & Void, Film Angels Studio and with the support of Eurimages, Aide aux Cinémas du Monde, Aide à la Coproduction Franco-Allemande, Centre National du Cinéma et de l'image Animée, Institut Français, Mitteldeutsche Medienförderung, Filmförderungsanstalt, Netherlands Film Fund, Netherlands Film Production Incentive, National Film Centre of Latvia, Riga Film Fund, Lithuanian Film Centre, Lithuanian National Radio and Television, and the Creative Europe Programme – Media of the European Union.

The film was shot in Latvia and Lithuania.

== Reception ==
=== Box office ===
The budget of the film was 2,000,000 euros and the Russia Box Office figures are $6,837 (1,583 viewers in total) with 35.7% collected during the first weekend.

=== Critical response ===
On review aggregator website Rotten Tomatoes, the film holds an approval rating of 74%, based on 34 reviews, and an average rating of 7.10/10. The website's critical consensus states, "A Gentle Creature isn't an easy watch, but this grim look at modern Russia's bureaucratic nightmare offers rich, thought-provoking rewards." On Metacritic, the film has a weighted average score of 78 out of 100, based on 10 critics, indicating "generally favorable reviews".

"A Gentle Creature is a brutally realist movie – at least at first – that takes its heroine on a pilgrimage into the vast, trackless forest of national suffering. Yet it does this with an unsettling, accelerating pattern of eerie coincidences and echoes, which finally mutates into a kind of satirical expressionism – a set-piece flourish which some might consider a bit of a narrative evasion or even an undermining of that basis of authenticity on which we had understood the movie. But it certainly provides a convulsive, if not cathartic kind of horror."

— Peter Bradshaw, The Guardian

"A Gentle Creature" is Loznitsa's cri de cœur, exhausted and exhausting. His portrait of Russia at the Revolution's centenary depicts a civil society that collapsed long ago and whose citizens are too shattered to care."

— Jay Weissburg, Variety

"All kinds of grim, including both the good and the bad kinds, A Gentle Creature (Krotkaya) from Belarus-born director Sergei Loznitsa peers deep into the Russian soul and finds there an unfathomable blackness. Only tenuously related to the Dostoyevsky story of the same name and the 1969 film adaptation of that source material by Robert Bresson, this harrowing tale revolves around a stoical unnamed woman (Vasilina Makovtseva) stuck in a nightmarish Siberian prison town. Although there are piercing echoes here of absurdist fiction by Nikolai Gogol, Franz Kafka and others, as well as mythical journeys to the underworld, Loznitsa's approach is uniquely cinematic and of a piece with his earlier work, both his two previous fiction features, My Joy and In the Fog, as well as his many potent, minimalist documentaries, like Maidan and Austerlitz."

— Leslie Felperin, The Hollywood Reporter

"Every individual has their own personal hell. By the same merit, there can be a 'personal hell' for entire nations. There are numerous books (Gogol, Dostoevkiy, Saltykov-Shedrin) and films (Leviathan, Loveless among latest ones) about the nature of Russia's 'own demons'. Loznitsa's latest film Gentle Creature is yet another volume that touches upon the same topic. The Gentle Creature is a story reminiscent of nothing less but Fanz Kafka's Castle and wearisome sufferings of K. Just like in Kafka, everything emanates hostility. But the source of hostility is hidden from the viewer; it is irrational and elusive. There doesn't appear to be a centre of this evil, no individual carriers or even obvious source. Thus, it can't be eliminated."

— Tamara Orlova-Alvarez, Ikon London Magazine
