= Vasilina Makovtseva =

Russian actress

- Василина Маковцева
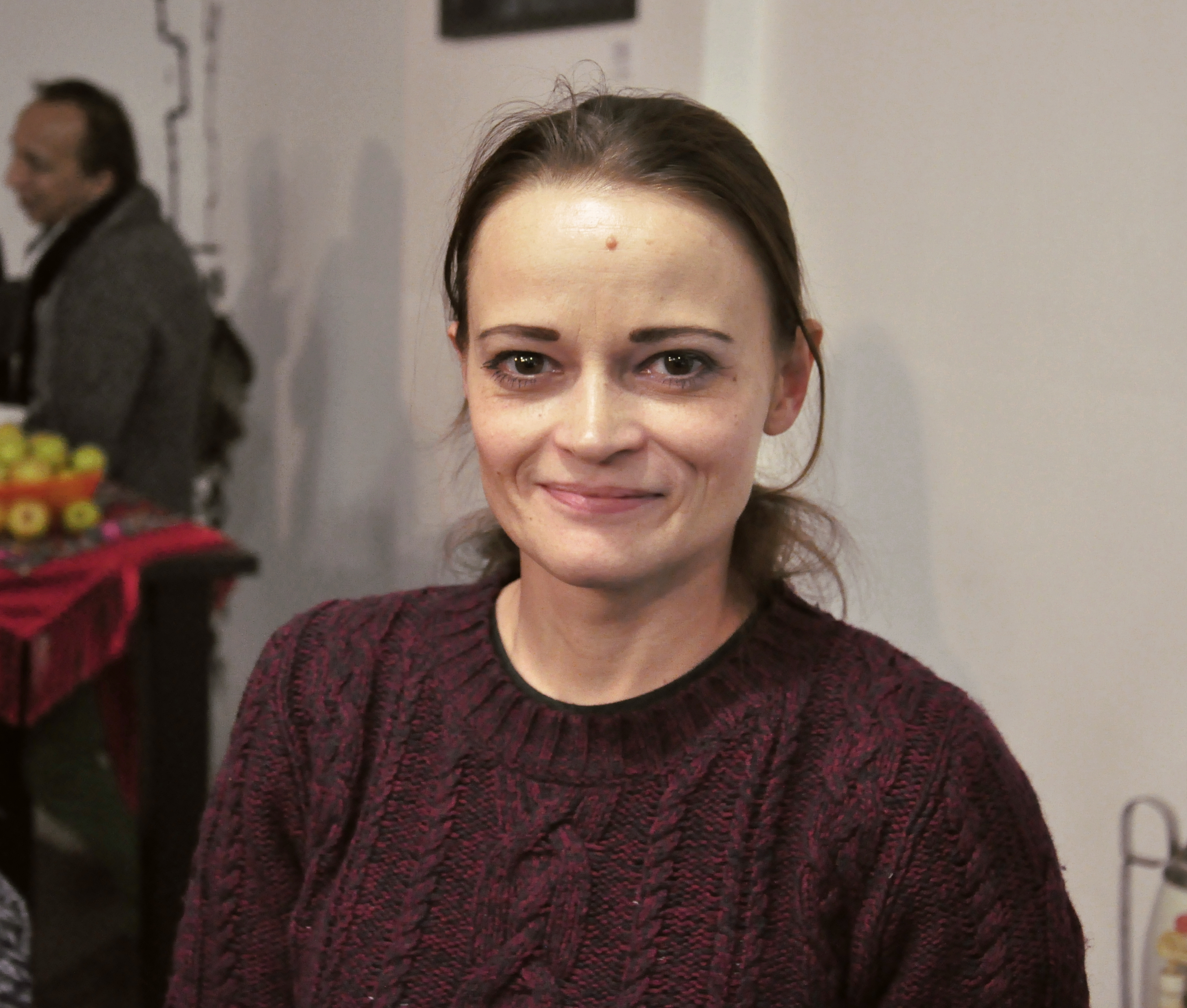
- Makovtseva in 2017
- Born: Vasilina Petrovna Makovtseva; November 14, 1977; Turukhansk, Krasnoyarsk Krai, RSFSR, USSR
- Citizenship: USSR; Russian Federation
- Education: Yekaterinburg Theatrical Institute, 2003
- Occupation: Actress
- Years active: 2004–present
- Notable work: A Gentle Creature
- Website: Vasilina Makovtseva

Vasilina Petrovna Makovtseva (Russian: Васили́на Петро́вна Ма́ковцева; born November 14, 1977) is a Russian theatre actress, one of the leading figures at the Kolayda-Theatre where she worked since 2004. Makovtseva is best remembered for her leading part in Krotkaya (A gentle creature), which she represented at Cannes Film Festival in 2017.

== Biography ==
Makovtseva was born in Turukhansk, Krasnoyarsk Krai, which was once considered a city of political prisoners. Her grandfather participated in the productions of provincial theater: he was both a decorator, and a director, and played several musical instruments. Her mother worked as a cashier at a small local airport. Vasilina's father worked as a blacksmith. There were eight children in the family and all had creative nature: one has passion in drawing, other- in writing, etc. Vasilina studied to play piano at Krasnoyarsk college of arts for 4 years.

She enrolled into the Yekaterinburg Theatre Institute and joined the Kirill Strezhnev's group. She took part in students productions on the stage of Academic Theater of Musical Comedy. There were: The Beatles: Lonely Hearts Club, Lion king, The Secret of Courage.

In 2003 she graduated from Yekaterinburg Theatre Institute and joined famous Nikolay Kolyada`s Kolyada-theatre, where she is an actress at the moment. She has played more than thirty roles, not counting productions for children. With the theater troupe she performed at many International theater festivals: Passages in Nancy (2009) and Metz (2013), at Shakespeare in Gdansk (2011), Bucharest (2012), Gyula (2018) and others. During the Paris tour of 2010, they acted on the stage of the Odeon Theater.

At age 20 she made her debut in film.
After years Sergei Loznitsa invited her to his film based on Dostoevsky in 2016 and gave her the leading part. That was A Gentle Creature.

"Vasilina Makovtseva’s performance of quiet despair and passivity is resourceful enough as to warrant, I think, a BEST ACTRESS prize."

— Ali Naderzad, Screen Comment

"I might be wrong, but I don’t think Makovsteva smiles once throughout the film, and her expressions often somehow seem older than the face they’re stretched across. Her work is muted and morose, but also nuanced and riveting, and there’s an exactness to her slow build of despair as she realises she may be snagged in a trap from which there’s no escape. What destroys you is she presses on."

— Robbie Collin, The Telegraph

== Theatre productions ==
=== Classic ===
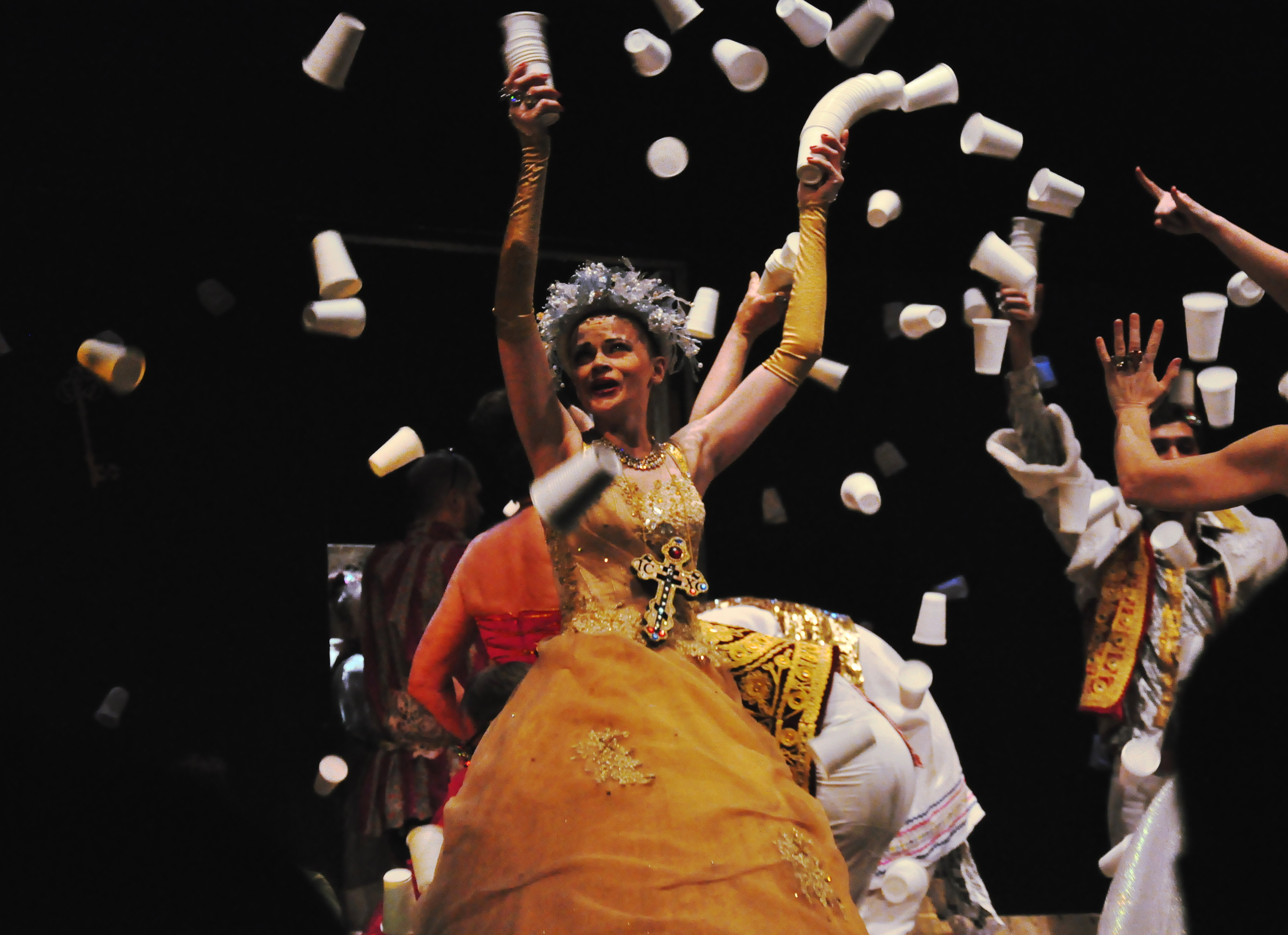
as Ranevskaya, The Cherry Orchard, 2014

as Nonna Dubovitskaya, A Hen, 2014

- Cinderella — Cinderella
- The Government Inspector — Maria Antonovna
- Hamlet — Ophelia
- Marriage — Fyokla Ivanovna
- King Lear — Cordelia
- The Nameless Star — Mona
- A Streetcar Named Desire — Blanche DuBois / Stella
- The Cherry Orchard — Ranevskaya
- Boris Godunov — Marina Mniszech
- Masquerade — Nina, Arbenin's wife
- Dead Souls — Anna Grigorievna
- Richard III — Lady Anne Neville
- Cat on a Hot Tin Roof — Margaret
- The Seagull — Arkadina
- The Forged Coupon — Young harlot
- The Old World Landowners — Yavdokha
- Ivan Fyodorovich Shponka and His Aunt — Natalia Grigorievna
- Optimistic Tragedy — Commissar
- Anna Karenina — Dolly Oblonskaya
- Taras Bulba — Mother
- The Fair at Sorochyntsi — Afanasy Ivanovych wife
- Without a Dowry — Harita Ogudalova

=== Contemporary drama ===
- Carmen's Alive!
- Madame Rosa
- Phoenix Bird
- Claustrophobia
- Tutankhamun
- Tenderness
- The Surveyor
- The Old Hare
- The Bouquet
- A Hen
- Two Plus Two
- The Front-line Woman
- Baba Chanel
- The Great Soviet Encyclopedia
- We Play Molière
- Grannie
- In This City He Lived And Worked ...
- The Purple Clouds
- The Twelve Chairs
- Mata Hari — Love
- Teach Me to Love
- Khabibulin goes from Vladivostok to Kaliningrad to Zoya
- Nosferatu
- Caligula
- Barbette gets dressed
- Don't turn on the blonde!
- Jade
- Picture
- Green finger

== Filmography ==
- Delo Bylo v Gavrilovke / Дело было в Гавриловке by Dmitry Astrakhan, Viktor Kobzev, Vladimir Rubanov, 2007
- Spasite Nashi Dushi / Спасите наши души by Kirill Belevich, 2008
- Vazhnyak / Важняк. Игра навылет by Ilya Khotinenko, 2011
- 29th Kilometr / 29 километр by Leonid Andronov, 2012
- Angels of Revolution / Ангелы революции by Aleksey Fedorchenko, 2014
- A Gentle Creature / Кроткая by Sergei Loznitsa, 2017
- A Siege Diary / Блокадный дневник by Andrey Zaytsev, 2020
- Asphalt sun / Асфальтовое солнце by Ilya Khotinenko, 2021
- Ripper's Bay / Коса by Igor Voloshin, 2021
- Second Sun / Второе солнце by Rinat Tashimov, 2021
- Kat / Кэт by Boris Akopov, 2022
- Lord of the Wind / Повелитель ветра by Igor Voloshin, 2023
- Disappearing cyclist / Исчезнувший велосипедист by Yuri Muravitskiy, 2024 (during production)
- The Wizard of the Emerald City / Волшебник Изумрудного города by Igor Voloshin, 2025 (during production)

== Personal life ==
Makovtseva lives in Yekaterinburg and is married to Russian actor Alexander Zamuraev.
