= 14 - Diaries of the Great War =

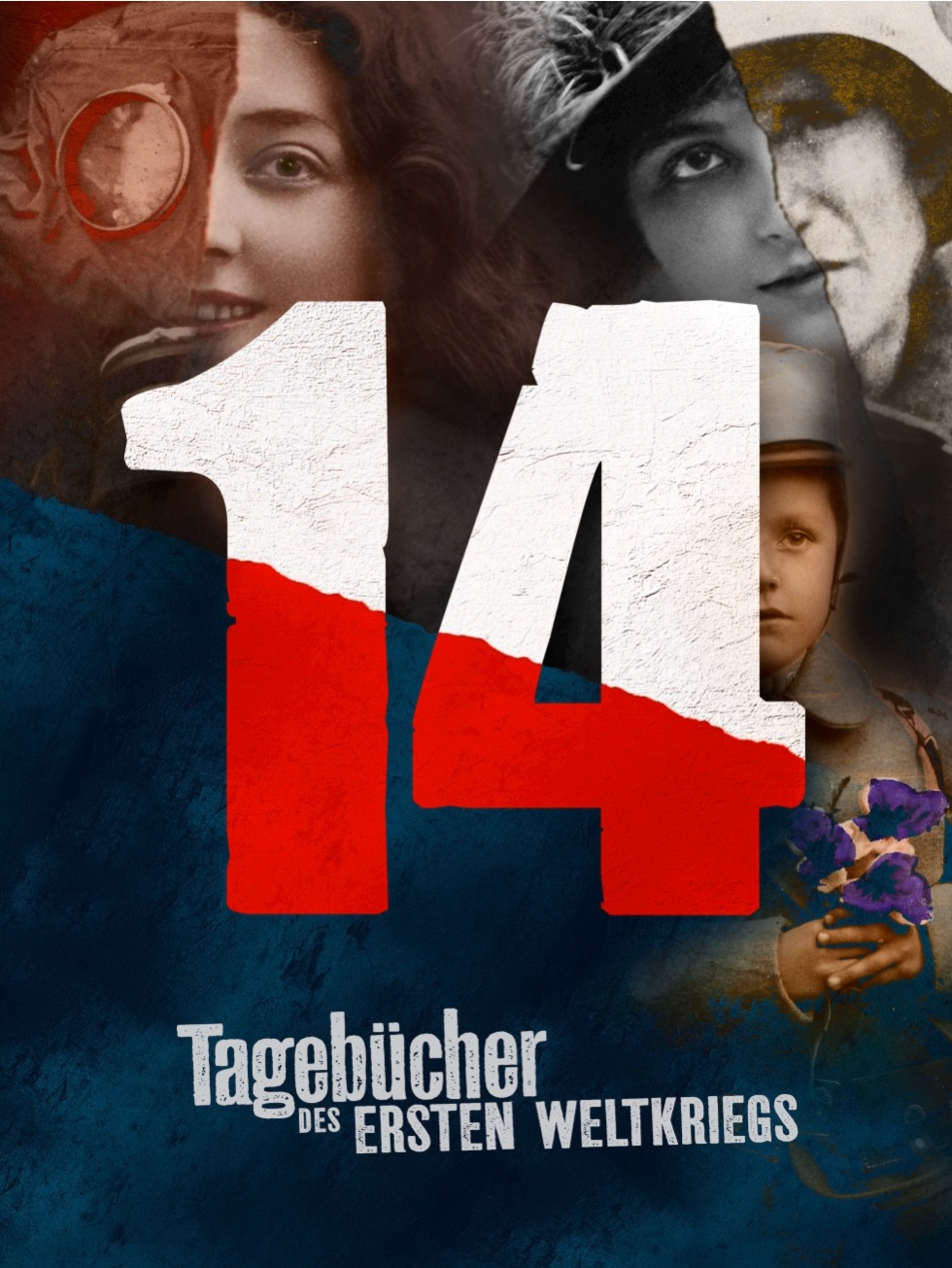
- Title card
- Genre: War
- Written by: Jan Peter; Yury Winterberg; Maarten van der Duin; Andrew Bampfield; Stephan Falk; Florian Huber
- Directed by: Jan Peter
- Theme music composer: Laurent Eyquem
- Countries of origin: Germany; France; Canada
- Original languages: German; French; English; Russian
- No. of episodes: 8

Production
- Producers: Gunnar Dedio; Serge Lalou; Laurent Duret; Paul Cadieux
- Cinematography: Jürgen Rehberg
- Editors: Susanne Schiebler; Martin Schröder; Jasmin Hoffhaus
- Running time: 416 minutes

Original release
- Network: ARTE; ARD; NDR; SWR; WDR; ORF; NTR; VPRO; BBC; S4C; SVT; RAI
- Release: 29 April – 13 May 2014

14 - Diaries of the Great War (titled Great War Diaries when aired on the BBC) is a 2014 international documentary drama series about World War I. It uses a mix of acted scenes, archive footage, and animation. All episodes were directed by Jan Peter, series authors were Jan Peter and Yury Winterberg. In a dramatic advisory capacity, Dutch producer and screenwriter Maarten van der Duin and BBC-author Andrew Bampfield worked on the film's development. The series is based on an idea by Gunnar Dedio, producer at the film company LOOKSfilm and Ulrike Dotzer, the Head of Department ARTE at Norddeutscher Rundfunk.

== Synopsis ==
The individual episodes of the series tell the story of the First World War, not from the perspective of politicians and the military; but from the perspective of soldiers, housewives, factory workers, nurses and children. In total there are 14 main characters. Meaningful scenes from their lives are re-enacted and intertwined. The result is not only a political or military history of the First World War, but a story that poignantly captures the feelings and moods of the people.

== Episodes ==
No.	Title	Directed by	Written by	Original release date
1	"The Abyss"	Jan Peter	Jan Peter, Yury Winterberg	29 April 2014
In the records of the young Cossack Marina Yurlova, the Austrian farmer Karl Kasser and the children Yves Congar and Elfriede Kuhr, who are experiencing the outbreak of war at home, there is little room for jubilant patriotism. The episode describes how everyday life collapsed with the beginning of the war, together with the inflammatory speeches of a teacher and the heroic portrayals of the first days of the war.
2	"The Onslaught"	Jan Peter	Jan Peter	29 April 2014
3	"The Anguish"	Jan Peter	Jan Peter, Yury Winterberg	6 May 2014
4	"The Heart's Desire"	Jan Peter	Jan Peter, Yury Winterberg	6 May 2014
5	"The Annihilation"	Jan Peter	Jan Peter, Yury Winterberg, Stephan Falk	6 May 2014
6	"The Home Front"	Jan Peter	Yury Winterberg, Jan Peter	13 May 2014
7	"The Uprising"	Jan Peter	Jan Peter, Florian Huber	13 May 2014
8	"The Tipping Point"	Jan Peter	Jan Peter	13 May 2014

== Cast and characters ==
- Sarah Broom Macnaughtan (portrayed by Celia Bannerman) was born on 26 October 1864 in Partick, Scotland. Already having served in the Boer War, the British woman had experience as a nurse. In 1914, when assistants were being sought for the British Army in Belgium, she volunteered. In 1915 she witnessed the first gas attack at Ypres. Macnaughtan died on 24 July 1916 at the age of 51 years.
- Charles Edward Montague (portrayed by David Acton) was born on 1 January 1867, the son of a Roman Catholic priest and grew up in London. After graduating, he became a journalist. Montague was anti-war and a pacifist - until the summer of 1914. Despite his 47 years, he volunteered for the war effort. After the war he resumed his journalistic career but retired shortly after in order to spend his old age as a writer. Charles Edward Montague died on 28 May 1928 at the age of 61 years.
- Käthe Kollwitz (portrayed by Christina Große) was born on 8 July 1867, in Königsberg. The well-known German artist was an avowed socialist and pacifist. But when the war began, the 47-year-old could not avoid the patriotic spirit of optimism in Germany. Her son Peter volunteered for military service, marched into Belgium in 1914 and was killed in October. Käthe Kollwitz died on 22 April 1945, in Moritzburg at the age of 77 years, a few days before the end of World War II.
- Ethel Cooper (portrayed by Megan Gay) was born on 24 December 1871 in North Adelaide. Between 1897 and 1906, she studied music in Leipzig, but returned temporarily to Australia. From 1911, Leipzig becomes her adopted home. When the war broke out, she found herself suddenly considered a foreign enemy. She was spied on and suffered from hunger and disease, but she was not allowed to leave the country. Caroline Ethel Cooper died on 25 May 1961 in Malvern, Australia at the age of 90.
- Louis Barthas (portrayed by Mikaël Fitoussi) was born the son of a barrel maker and a seamstress on 14 July 1879 in the French wine-growing region of Languedoc. He took up his father's profession. At 35 years of age Barthas was recruited into the reserve army. In the last days of 1914 he found himself on one of the most dangerous sections of the German-French front and experienced the horrors of trench warfare. After the war, he began work as a barrel maker once again. Barthas died on 4 May 1952 at the age of 72 years.
- Karl Kasser (portrayed by David Oberkogler) was born in 1889 in the Lower Austrian town of Kilb. Despite a hand injury, the 25-year-old farmer was deemed fit for military service. Reluctantly, he had to enlist in early 1915. He was captured by the Russians during fighting on the Eastern Front. This was the beginning of a multi-year odyssey throughout the Tsarist Empire which only ended on 4 October 1920. Karl Kasser died in 1976 at the age of 87 years.
- Gabrielle West (portrayed by Naomi Sheldon) was born in 1890. For the young woman from a wealthy British family, it was only natural to serve her country through volunteer work. She becomes a guard in a munitions factory, where she is confronted with the terrible working conditions of the women there. Her date of death is unknown. Her diary was published under the name World War I diary of Miss G. West.
- Paul Pireaud (portrayed by Lazare Herson-Macarel) was born in 1890 in southwestern France. At the beginning of the war, Marie and Paul Pireaud were a young couple. But the young farmer was separated for a long time from his wife, Marie, by the war. His only connection to her was the field post. In his letters he tells of the suffering of the soldiers at the front. After many years together with his wife, Paul Pireaud died in 1970 shortly before his 80th birthday.Your Death Would Be Mine: Paul and Marie Pireaud in the Great War, by Martha Hanna, was published in 2008.
- Marie Pireaud (portrayed by Emilie Aubertot) was born in 1892 near Paris. At the beginning of the war, Marie and Paul Pireaud were a happy, young couple. However, when her husband went to war, Marie had to do the hard work on the farm. In her very personal letters to Paul she writes about her jealousy and her great desire for intimacy, tenderness and a child. Later the couple give birth to a son. But there are unfortunately no grandchildren who might remember the love of the two. Marie Pireaud died eight years after her husband in September 1978 at the age of 86 years. Your Death Would Be Mine: Paul and Marie Pireaud in the Great War, by Martha Hanna, was published in 2008.
- Vincenzo D'Aquila (portrayed by Jacopo Menicagli) was born on 19 September 1892 in Palermo, Sicily. After the emigration of his family, he grew up in the United States. In the spring of 1915, the 22-year-old travelled with a ship full of volunteers who wanted to fight for their original homeland. In Europe, however, the fighting caused D'Aquila to have psychological issues. After the initial enthusiasm, D’Aquila was taken by disillusionment of a war that manifested itself in all its atrocity. He was forcibly consigned to a mental hospital with poor conditions characteristic of the time period, most particularly suspicion from the doctors that he was faking his issues to avoid the front. D'Aquila died on 26 April 1975 at the age of 82 years. In 1931 he wrote a memoir based on his experience titled Bodyguard Unseen: A True Autobiography. The book was published in New York by Richard R. Smith and appeared in Italy in 2019 for the first time.
- Ernst Jünger (portrayed by Jonas Friedrich Leonhardi) was born on 29 March 1895 in Heidelberg. The then high school student, who later became a writer, signed up for military service in August 1914. At the end of 1914, he was assigned to the front in France. He survived several battles before the end of the war in 1918, including the bloody battles of the Somme. He died in 1998 at the age of 102 years at the hospital in Riedlingen.
- Marina Yurlova (portrayed by Natalia Witmer) was born in 1901 in a small village in the Caucasus. The daughter of a colonel of the Kuban Cossacks was just 14 years old when her father went to war in August 1914. In the search for her father, she became a child soldier in the Russian army at age 14. She originally worked as a groom in Armenia; however, after two months of this she was sent to fight the Turkish Army. In 1915 she was wounded while blasting bridges across the Erivan River. She was treated at the Red Cross hospital in Baku and then returned to the Eastern Front. In 1916 she was again wounded and also had a mental breakdown and was sent to an asylum. However, in 1919 she was released and emigrated to the United States. Yurlova published two autobiographies, Cossack Girl (1934) and Russia Farewell (1936). In 1984 Marina Yurlova died at the age of 84 years.
- Elfriede Alice Kuhr (portrayed by Elisa Monse) was born on 25 April 1902, in the German town of Schneidemühl (modern Pila), about 100 kilometers from the border with Russia. At the beginning of the war, the 12 -year-old girl, who lived with her grandmother, celebrated the German victories; but then Elfriede experienced how the war brought suffering and misery. She died on 29 March 1989, at the age of 86 years.
- Yves Congar (portrayed by Antoine de Prekel) was born on 8 April 1904 in Sedan in northern France, where he grew up well protected until the age of ten. In 1914, he had to experience the German invasion and beginning of a four-year occupation of his hometown. Later he would become a Catholic theologian and cardinal. Yves Congar died on 22 June 1995 at the age of 91 years in Paris.

== Production ==
The series was produced by LOOKSfilm Leipzig, Les Films d’ici Paris und Filmoption International Montreal. The series is one of the most elaborate docudrama formats ever co-produced in Germany and was already sold in more than 25 countries worldwide before broadcast. The budget for the German version alone was around 6 million euros, for all the international versions together the budget was closer to 8 million euros.

=== Development ===
The scripts are based on quotes from diaries and letters from men and women who experienced World War I in Germany, France, the United Kingdom, Italy, Austria-Hungary, Russia and the United States, who wrote during the period from 1914 to 1918. More than 1,000 journals and collections of letters were examined and 14 stories of World War I were selected from this compilation. Overall, the selection of the diaries and subsequent development work took four years.

=== Archive footage ===
The series uses cinematic and photographic archive material from a total of 71 archives in 21 countries. Most material came from British Pathé (United Kingdom), Gaumont Pathé (France), Krasnogorsk (Russia), Bundesfilmarchiv (Germany), Österreichisches Filmmuseum, the National Archives and Records Administration (USA) and the Imperial War Museum.

=== Filming ===
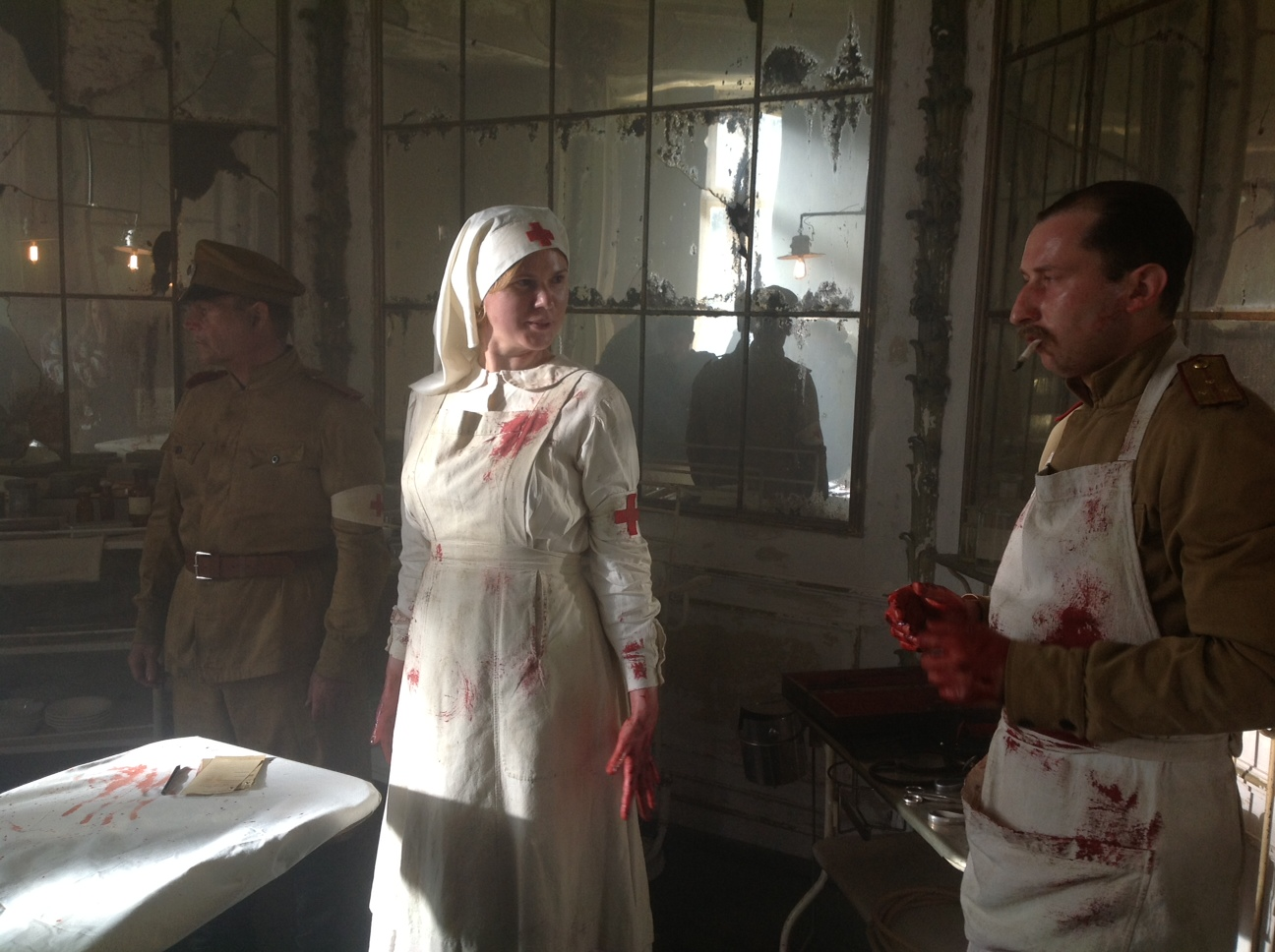
Russian hospital at Frœschwiller chateau

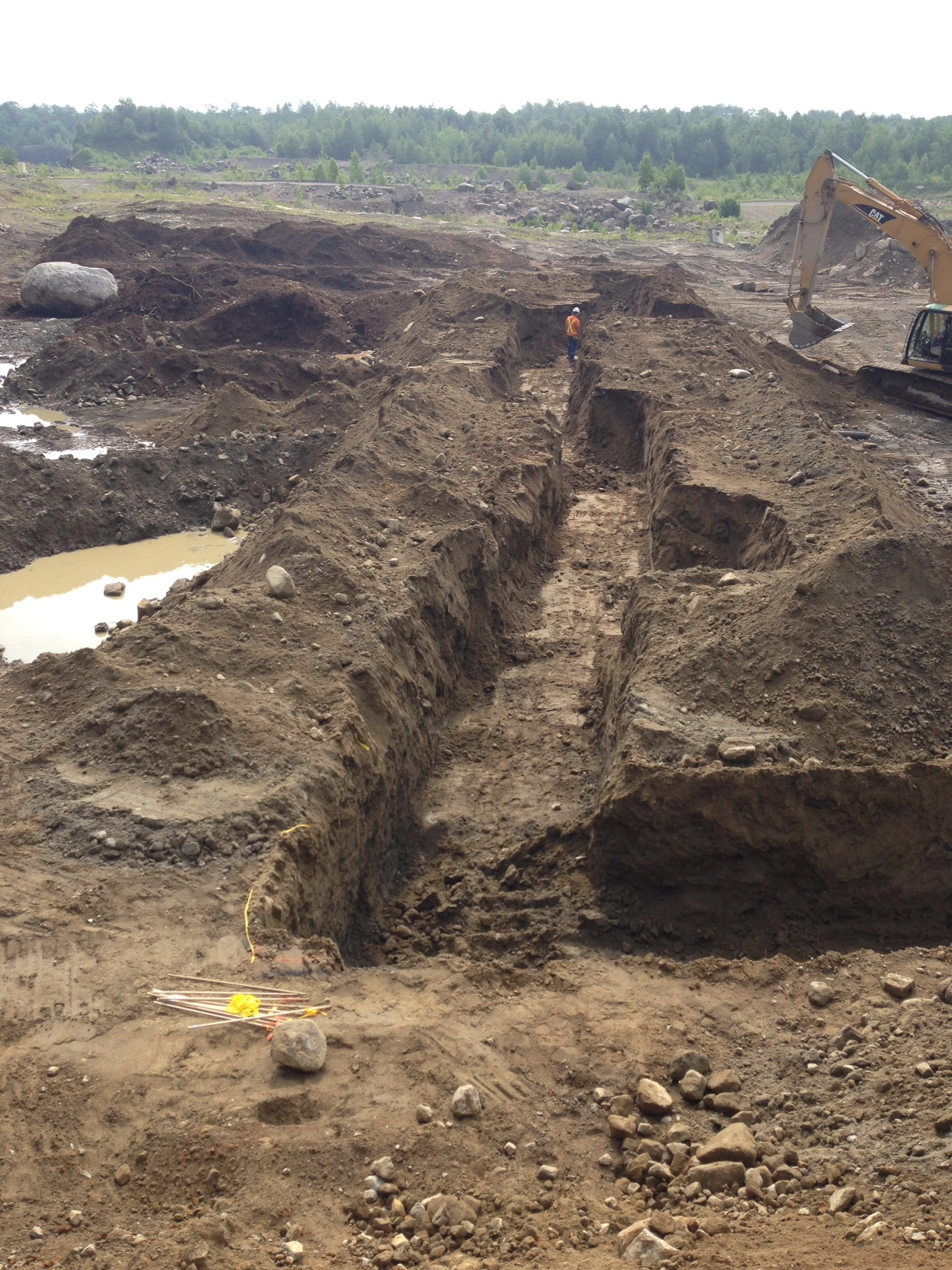
Constructing trenches in the no-man's-land in Saint-Jerôme, Quebèc

The series was filmed in France, Canada and Germany. Filming took place over a total of 50 days. The French part of the shoot took place in and around Strasbourg. Among the location were the historical baths, an abandoned brewery and the chateau of Frœschwiller. The Canadian part of the shoot took place in the province of Québec. Among the locations were an old quarry north of Montreal, where a trench system, complete with accompanying No-Man's-Land was constructed.

=== Team ===
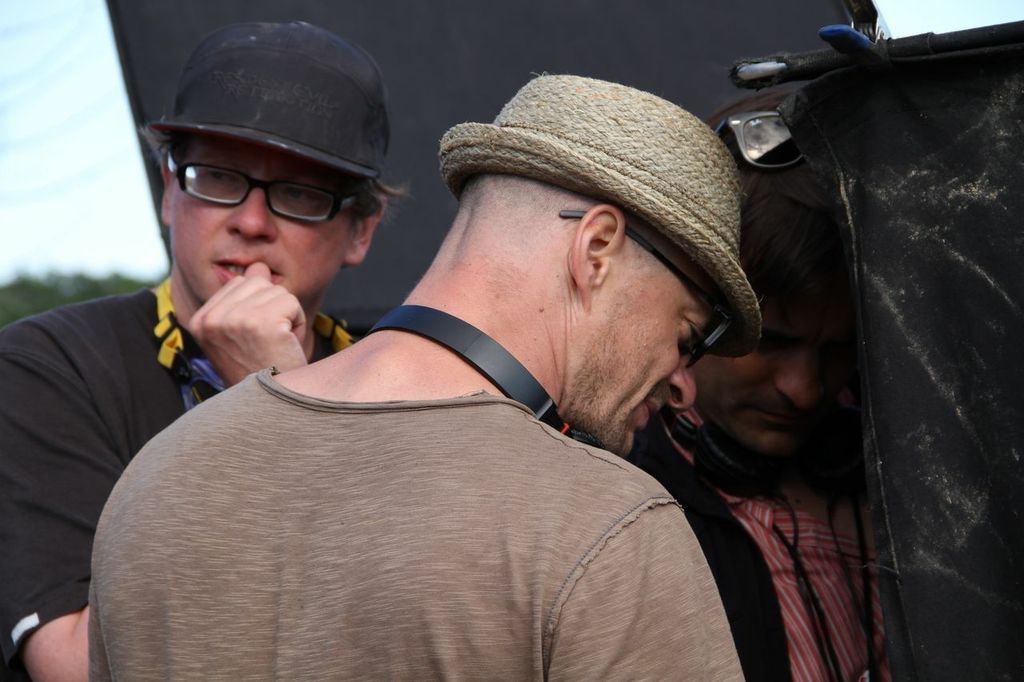
Director Jan Peter and cinematographer during production in Canada

Director	Jan Peter
Authors	Jan Peter, Yury Winterberg, Maarten van der Duin, Andrew Bampfield, Stephan Falk, Florian Huber
Cinematography	Jürgen Rehberg
Music	Laurent Eyquem
Production Design	Patric Valverde, Michel Marsolais
Costume Design	Valerie Adda
Editing & Graphics Design	Susanne Schiebler
Editing	Martin Schröder, Jasmin Hoffhaus

=== Music ===
The score was created by the French composer Laurent Eyquem. Choir pieces were recorded in Prague.

== Release ==
=== Broadcast ===
Arte began broadcasting the eight-part series on 29 April 2014 in Germany and France, to commemorate the 100th anniversary of the start of World War I. Additional partners of the series are SWR, NDR and WDR in Germany; ORF in Austria; and the BBC in the United Kingdom. ARD and ORF broadcast the series as four episodes of 45 minutes each. The BBC broadcast the series under the title Great War Diary in three episodes of 60 minutes.

Dutch broadcasters NTR and VPRO produced an additional episode about the situation in the Netherlands which aired on 5 April 2014, on Nederland 2. The remaining eight "international" episodes aired in the Netherlands between 12 April and 7 June.

Sweden's SVT had several additional segments produced for their airing of the series which included introductions to each episode by historian and author Peter Englund and dramatisations of diaries from six Swedes to tell the story of Sweden during the Great War. These were edited into the original eight episodes which meant they ended up with a running time of sixty minutes. This version of the series premièred on SVT1 on 26 June.

=== Home media ===
The German edition of the series was released on 14 May 2014, on DVD and Blu-ray Disc.

== In other media ==
=== Radio feature ===
Beginning on 9 March 2014 the WDR broadcast a six-part, eponymous Radio Documentary by Christine Sievers and Nicolaus Schröder. This series is based and created in collaboration with the TV series.

=== Print ===
The series is accompanied by a coffee table book, which was published by BBC Books in the United Kingdom, and Bucher Verlag in Germany. In eight chapters, the book presents high resolution photographs, which were colorized prior and during World War I. Each photo is accompanied by a diary quote. The foreword is written by Peter Englund. The book "14 - Der große Krieg" by Oliver Janz was published in October 2013 by Campus Verlag.

=== Exhibition ===
The Military History Museum Dresden shows in a special exhibition "14-Menschen-Krieg" from 01. August 2014 until 24. February 2015 all 14 biographies and their perspectives on World War I. The exhibition focuses on the eve of the war and furthermore shows the dimension and forms of sufferings of both, soldiers and civilians. The exhibition draws a conclusion of World War I and ends with a forecast on the soon to follow World War II.

== Reception ==
=== Critical response ===
The series received very positive reviews. Frankfurter Allgemeine Zeitung called it "Gripping, emotional, and real. A milestone for European television.". Süddeutsche Zeitung describes the series as "A story of the destruction and the future of television.". Stuttgarter Zeitung calls it "Woven together like a modern television series.". Neue Zürcher Zeitung says that "the program manages to fascinate by combining different observations, in different locations, and managing to condense these into a coherent mood.". Le Monde ascribes to the series "a never before seen virtuosity", while Direct Matin calls it "of exceptional quality." The Dutch version of the series was described as follows by NRC Handelsblad: "Phantastic Television Making... We ride a rollercoaster of emotions, as if we are not supposed to understand history but rather to live it ourselves." After watching the series on Netflix, William F.B. O'Reilly called the series "superbly done" and said "unlike other Netflix programming that escapes the mind moments after consumption, "14" lingers. It consumes its viewers rather than the other way around."

=== Audience ratings ===
Broadcaster	Country	Timeslot	Target Rating for Timeslot	Average Rating Episodes 1-8 (in %)
ARTE	Germany	Tuesday, 20.15 - 22.50	1,0%	1,4%
ARTE	France	Tuesday, 20.50 - 23.35	2,0%	2,2%
ORF	Austria	Tuesday, 22.35 - 00.05 + Friday, 22.50 - 00.20	12,2%	14,0%
