= Moordvrouw =

Dutch television series

- Genre: Drama, police
- Created by: Maarten van der Duin
- Written by: Maarten van der Duin; Lex Passchier; Steven R. Thé; Pasja van Dam; Reint Schölvinck; Simon de Waal; Michael Leendertse; Willem Bosch; Thomas van der Ree
- Directed by: Joram Lürsen; Marcel Visbeen; Tim Oliehoek; André van Duren; Ben Sombogaart; Hanro Smitsman
- Starring: Wendy van Dijk; Ali Ben Horsting; Thijs Römer; Achmed Akkabi; Fockeline Ouwerkerk
- Theme music composer: Elske DeWall
- Opening theme: "This Game"
- Country of origin: Netherlands
- Original language: Dutch
- No. of seasons: 6
- No. of episodes: 60

Production
- Executive producers: Gerd Jan van Dalen (2012–2014); Ingrid Remeijsen (2015)
- Producers: Remco Kobus (2012–2014); Laurens Drillich (2015)
- Editors: Boelie Vis; Joseph Derksen; Christine Houbiers; Marcel Wijninga; Niels Koopman
- Running time: 45 minutes
- Production company: Endemol

Original release
- Network: RTL 4 (Netherlands); VTM (Belgium)
- Release: 2 January 2012

Moordvrouw is a Dutch television series broadcast by RTL 4 and in Flanders by VTM.

== Crew ==
The creative director of the first season was Joram Lürsen. After the first season he was replaced by Gerd Jan van Dalen and Marcel Visbeen. Van Dalen is also executive producer of the series. Visbeen was also director of 12 episodes. Ben Sombogaart (8), Tim Oliehoek (6), André van Duren (6), Hanro Smitsman (5) en Joram Lürsen (2) are the other directors.

The series' developer is Maarten van der Duin. He wrote the first four episodes with Lex Passchier. The other writers are: Lex Passchier (30), Pasja van Dam (8), Maarten van der Duin (4), Steven R. Thé (3), Reint Schölvinck (2), Simon de Waal (2), Michael Leendertse (1), Willem Bosch (1), and Thomas van der Ree (1).

== Cast ==
Actor	Personage	Episodes						
Actor	Personage	1	2	3	4	5	6	7
Wendy van Dijk	Fenna Kremer	10	10	10	10	10	10	8
Achmed Akkabi	Bram Amezain	10	10	10	10	10	10	8
Thijs Römer	Evert Numan	10	5	10	10	10	10	8
Renée Soutendijk	Carla Vreeswijk	10	10	10	10	10	-	-
Porgy Franssen	Menno de Waard	10	10	10	10	9	-	-
Fockeline Ouwerkerk	Liselotte van Kempen	-	10	10	10	10	10	6
Mehrnoush Rahmani	Samantha Fardjam	-	-	-	3	10	3	-
Chava Voor in 't Holt	Simone Blok	10	-	-	-	-	-	-
Bram van der Vlugt	Onno Kremer	-	5	5	-	-	-	-
Kasper van Kooten	Jelle van Santen	-	-	7	2	-	-	-
Ali Ben Horstin	Dries van Zijverden	-	-	-	-	-	10	8

== Episodes ==
Season	Episodes	TV date	DVD date	Viewers average
1	10	20 January 2012 – 23 March 2012	27 March 2012	1,816,300
2	10	4 January 2013 – 1 March 2013	4 June 2013	1,423,200
3	10	9 February 2014 – 13 April 2014	25 April 2014	1,837,400
4	10	4 January 2015 – 8 March 2015	24 April 2015	1,570,500
5	10	3 January 2016 – 6 March 2016		
6	10	8 January 2017 – 12 March 2017		
7	8	21 January 2018 – 11 March 2018		
