= The Cuba Libre Story =

2015 documentary series on Cuba

- Genre: Documentary
- Directed by: Emmanuel Amara; Kai Christiansen; Florian Dedio
- No. of seasons: 1
- No. of episodes: 8

Production
- Executive producers: Gunnar Dedio; Grégory Schnebelen; Igor Prokopenko
- Producers: Regina Bouchehri; Louis-David Delahaye; Birgit Rasch; Olga Zatulkina
- Running time: 52 minutes
- Production company: LOOKSfilm

Original release
- Network: Netflix
- Release: December 8, 2016

The Cuba Libre Story is a documentary series that portrays the history of Cuba from colonial times to 2015. The eight-part series was released on Netflix on December 11, 2015.

For The Cuba Libre Story, more than 50 international Cuba experts and contemporary witnesses were interviewed–both supporters and opponents of Fidel Castro and his predecessor Fulgencio Batista. Among them are Cuba's former intelligence chief Juan Antonio Rodríguez Menier and KGB Latin America chief Nikolai Leonov, Che Guevara's comrade Dariel Alarcón and CIA agent Félix Rodríguez, Fidel Castro's former lover Marita Lorenz and his former bodyguard Carlos Calvo, the stepdaughter of Mafia boss Meyer Lansky, Cuba's famous novelist Leonardo Padura and the last Head of State of the GDR and personal friend of the Castro brothers, Egon Krenz.

== Episodes ==
No.	Title	Original release date
1	"Breaking Chains"	December 11, 2015
2	"War and Sugar"	December 11, 2015
3	"Gangster's Paradise"	December 11, 2015
4	"A Ragtag Revolution"	December 11, 2015
5	"Making Heroes"	December 11, 2015
6	"Of Soviets and Saviors"	December 11, 2015
7	"Secrets and Sacrifices"	December 11, 2015
8	"Moments of Transition"	December 11, 2015
