= Ariane Riecker =

German writer and film director

- Born: 1969 (age 56–57); Germany
- Occupations: Author film director

Ariane Riecker (born in 1969) is a German author and director of documentaries and reports. She is known for her documentary Mein Vater, der Türke in collaboration with Marcus Vetter.

== Life and career ==
Ariane Riecker grew up in Berlin and Paris. After studying journalism and art history, Riecker worked as a freelance author. She published various non-fiction books, including Stasi intim with Dirk Schneider and Annett Schwarz. Gespräche mit ehemaligen MfS-Angehörigen (Talking to former MfS officials) (1990) and Laienspieler : sechs Politikerporträts (Amateur players: six political portraits) : Peter-Michael Diestel, Gregor Gysi, Regine Hildebrandt, Günther Krause, Wolfgang Thierse, Konrad Weiss : and an interview with Friedrich Schorlemmer (1991).

Riecker lived and worked in Los Angeles from 1999 to 2005. Her work during this time includes the documentary Dennis Hopper – Create Or Die, which premiered at the Berlinale in 2003.

Riecker has worked for ARD, ZDF, MDR, Arte and other broadcasters as a documentary and report director and scriptwriter since 2001.

== Filmography ==
- 2002: Dennis Hopper – Create Or Die/Spiel Oder Stirb
- 2006: Mein Vater der Türke
- 2009/10: Damals nach der DDR
- 2010/11: Hans Zimmer – Der Sound für Hollywood
- 2012: Nur eine Spritze – Der größte Medienskandal der DDR
- 2012: Was verdienen die Ostdeutschen?
- 2012: Ist der Osten aufgebaut?
- 2013: Generation Wende
- 2014: Wetter und Architektur – Bauen für die Zukunft
- 2015: Wem gehört der Osten?
- 2016: Wer beherrscht den Osten?
- 2017: Wer bezahlt den Osten?
- 2017: Der Pflegeaufstand
- 2018: Wer braucht den Osten?

== Books ==
- Stasi intim. Gespräche mit ehemaligen MfS-Angehörigen, Leipzig, Forum 1990, ISBN 9783861510086
- Laienspieler : sechs Politikerporträts : Peter-Michael Diestel, Gregor Gysi, Regine Hildebrandt, Günther Krause, Wolfgang Thierse, Konrad Weiss : und ein Interview mit Friedrich Schorlemmer, Leipzig, Forum 1991, ISBN 9783861510239

== Awards ==
- Prix Europa 2006, together with Marcus Vetter (for: Mein Vater der Türke)
- Golden Gate Award 2007, together with Marcus Vetter (for: Mein Vater der Türke)
- Preis der Friedrich- und Isabell-Vogelstiftung für herausragenden Wirtschaftsjournalismus 2017, together with Dirk Schneider (for: Wer bezahlt den Osten?)
- Medienpreis Mittelstand 2018, together with Dirk Schneider (for: Wer bezahlt den Osten?)
- Preis der Friedrich- und Isabell-Vogelstiftung für herausragenden Wirtschaftsjournalismus 2018, together with Dirk Schneider (for: Wer braucht den Osten?)
