= Ekaterina Barabash =

Ukrainian-Russian journalist (born 1961)

- Barabash in 2025
- Born: Ekaterina Yurievna Barabash; April 26, 1961 (age 65); Kharkiv, Ukrainian SSR, USSR
- Occupations: film critic journalist

Ekaterina Yurievna Barabash (Russian: Екатерина Юрьевна Барабаш; born 26 April 1961) is a Ukrainian and Russian journalist who is currently living in exile in France.

== Early life ==
Barabash was born in Kharkiv, Ukraine. When she was five, her father, Yury Barabash became the deputy editor-in-chief of Literaturnaya Gazeta and moved the family to Moscow, Russia.

== Career ==
Barabash worked for Interfax until 2016; she was fired for criticizing the Kremlin. She also contributed to Radio France Internationale.

She later worked for Republic.ru, a Russian media outlet that was banned in 2022, after the fullscale Russian invasion of Ukraine began.

In February 2025, Barabash was arrested by the Russian Investigative Committee after coming back from the Berlin International Film Festival; her son said the charges were likely because of her work. She was charged with spreading false information about Russia's military and faced a 5-10 year prison sentence.

Barabash was placed under house arrest, but disappeared 13 April, with Russian state media describing her as wanted by police. She said she crossed the border out of Russia on 26 April, her birthday.

In May 2025, she arrived in France after fleeing Russia with the assistance of Reporters Without Borders (RSF), in what the RSF director described as "one of the most perilous operations" that RSF had been involved in since the beginning of the fullscale invasion. During her escape, she traveled 2,800 kilometers and at one point needed to go fully offline, losing all contact with RSF.

== Personal life ==
Barabash has a son and grandson, who both live in Kyiv. Her daughter-in-law is Lyuba Yakimchuk.

== See also ==
- Marina Ovsyannikova, another journalist smuggled out of Russia into France
