= Kilb =

Town in Lower Austria, Austria

- Municipality
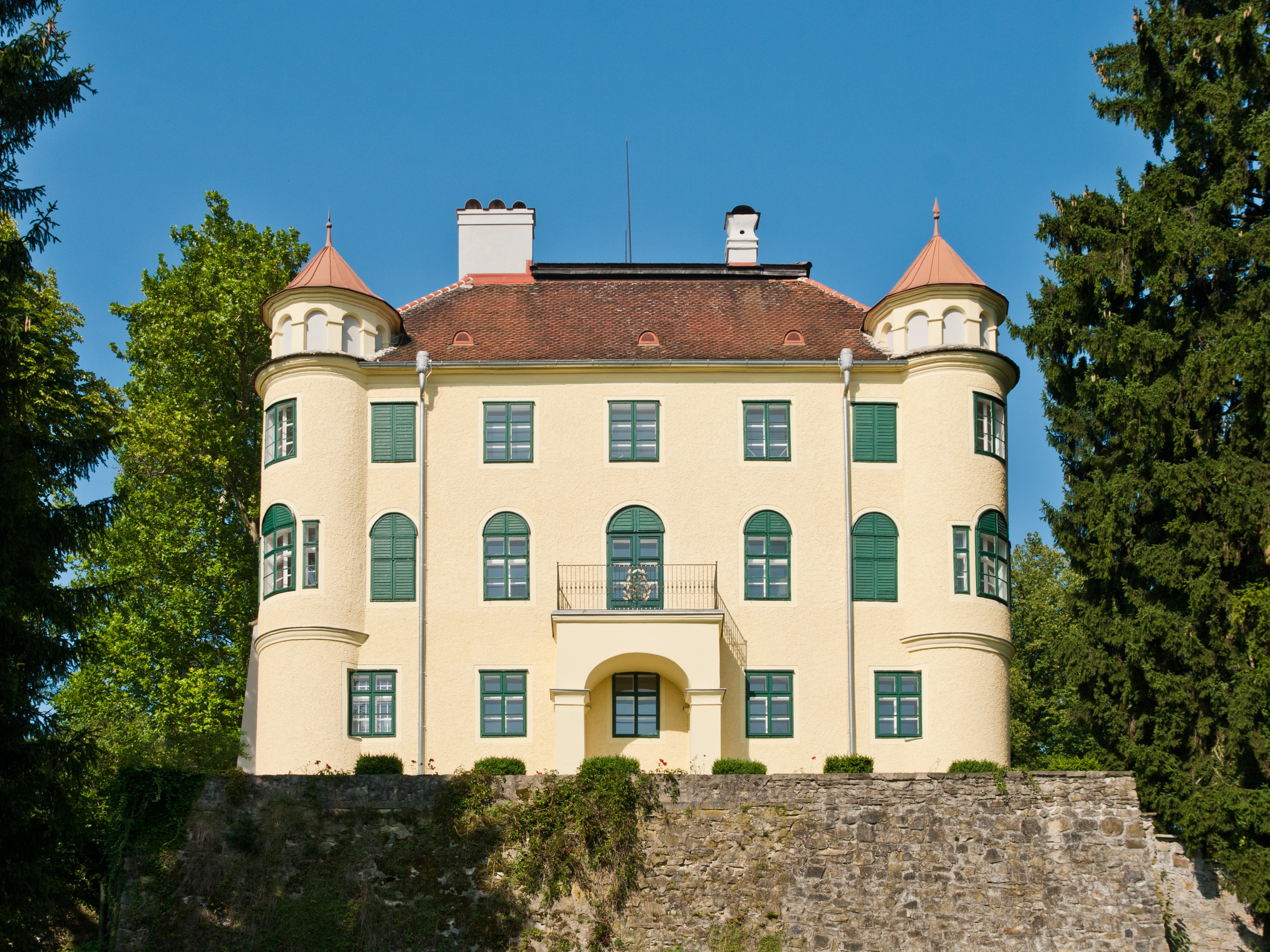
- Grünbühel Castle in Kilb

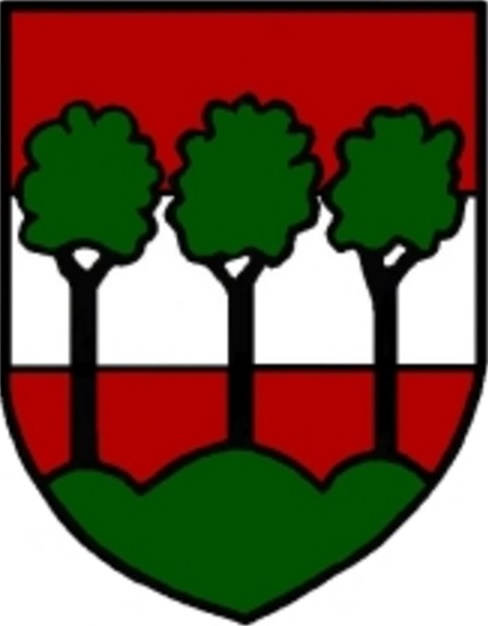
- Coat of arms

- Location within Austria
- Coordinates: 48°5′N 15°24′E
- Country: Austria
- State: Lower Austria
- District: Melk

Government
  - Mayor: Manfred Roitner

Area
  - Total: 45.18 km^{2} (17.44 sq mi)
- Elevation: 300 m (980 ft)

Population (2018-01-01)
  - Total: 2,543
  - Density: 56.29/km^{2} (145.8/sq mi)
- Time zone: UTC+1 (CET)
  - Summer (DST): UTC+2 (CEST)
- Postal code: 3233
- Area code: 02748
- Website: www.kilb.at

Kilb is a town in the district of Melk in the Austrian state of Lower Austria.

== Geography ==
Kilb lies in the foothills of the Alps on the Sierning River, which has its source in the municipality. About 25.93 percent of the municipality is forested.
