= Marina Yurlova =

Russian child soldier and author

- Марина Юрлова
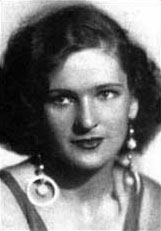
- Born: Marina Maximilionovna Yurlova; 25 February 1900; Raevskaya, Don Cossack Host, Russian Empire
- Died: 1 April 1984 (aged 84); New York City, New York, U.S.
- Occupations: soldier, writer, dancer
- Notable work: Cossack Girl, Russia Farewell

Marina Yurlova (Russian: Мари́на Максимилиа́новна Ю́рлова; 25 February 1900 – 1 April 1984) was a Russian female child soldier and author. She fought in World War I and later in the Russian Civil War on the side of the anti-communist White movement. Wounded several times, she won the Russian Cross of Saint George for bravery three times. She eventually made her way to Vladivostok, then to Japan and finally to the United States, where she performed as a dancer.

Yurlova published her autobiography in three parts: Cossack Girl (1934, republished in 2010), Russia Farewell (1936) and The Only Woman (1937).

== Biography ==
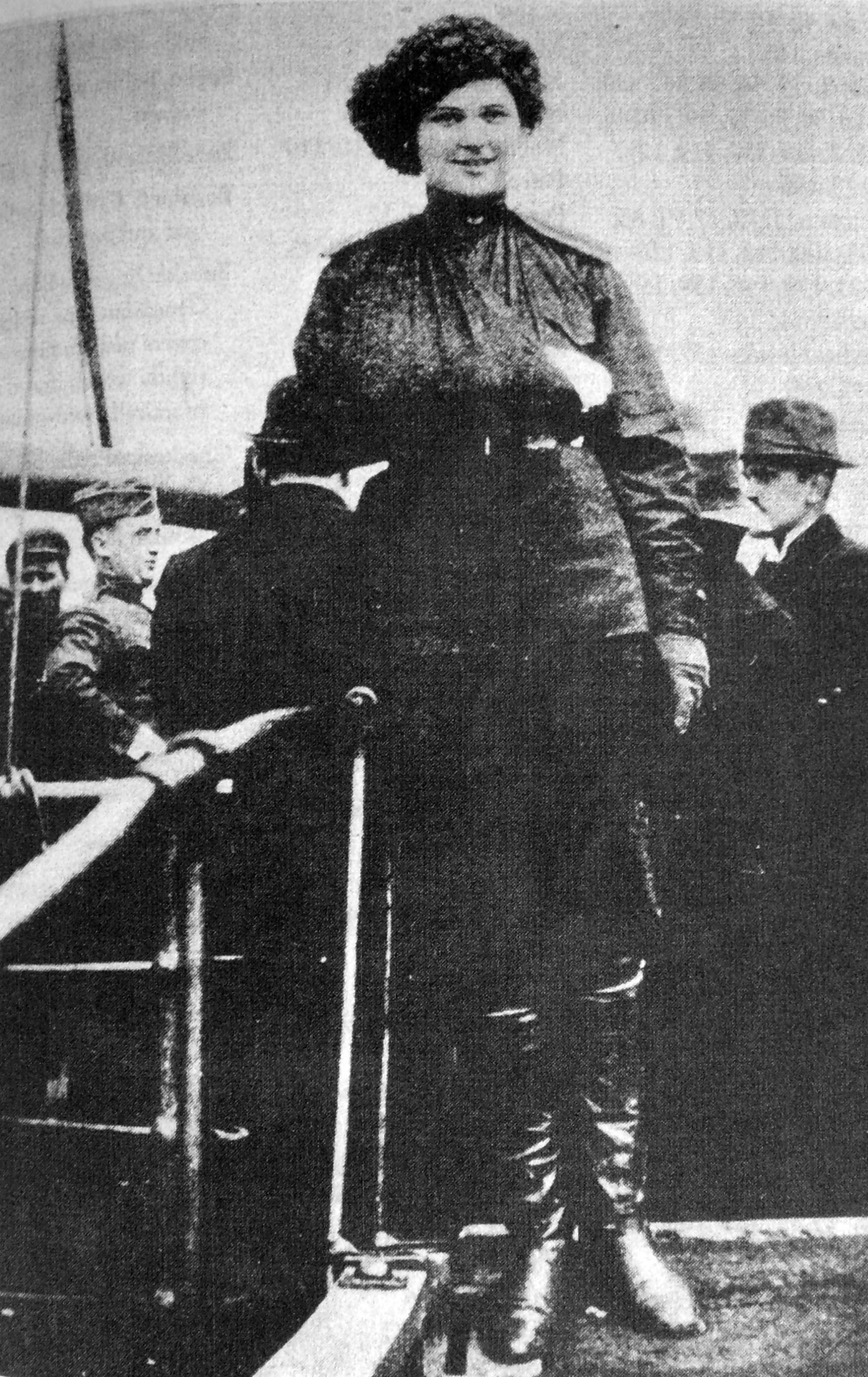
Marina Yurlova during World War I

She was born in Raevskaya, a small village near Krasnodar. The daughter of a colonel of the Kuban Cossacks, she was just 14 years old when her father went to war in August 1914. Caught up in the adventure and tradition of Cossack women following their men to the front, she became a child soldier in the Russian army at age 14. Specifically, she joined the Reconnaissance Sotnia (100 horse squadron) of the 3rd Ekaterinodar Regiment.

Yurlova originally worked as a groom in Armenia; She was mentored and protected by a sergeant in the army of the Causcasus named Kosel, who procured a uniform for Marina and made her a sort of mascot for his unit. In 1915, she was on a dangerous mission in which Kosel was killed, and she was shot in the leg while blasting bridges across the Araxes River near Yerevan. She was treated at the Red Cross hospital in Baku and then returned to the Eastern Front, where she trained as an auto mechanic and became a military driver. In 1917, she was wounded, and spent nearly the entire year 1918 in a hospital in Moscow, suffering from concussion and shell shock - the result of an explosion.

After her release, she again joined the Russian forces under the command of Captain Vladimir Kappel, and was shot through the shoulder by Bolsheviks while on patrol. According to her autobiography, she was wrongly sent to an asylum in Omsk for a period of about three weeks as she recovered from this wound and from shell shock. Due to the intervention of a friendly officer, she was released and given passage and 500 rubles to travel to the American hospital in Vladivostok. The train she was a passenger on was stopped in the middle of the Siberian wasteland, sandwiched between two Bolshevik armies. Led by a contingent of Russian officers, along with party of about 100 Royalists (both men and women) she walked through Siberia for a month, eventually reaching the American hospital in Vladivostok. The American hospital, Marina said, "was quite perfectly run, quite perfectly kind", and after recuperating there for three weeks, she was given passport and passage to Sulphur Springs, Japan.

In 1922, she emigrated to the United States, where she performed as a dancer. She married filmmaker William C. Hyer in December 1925 and became a U.S. citizen in 1926.

On 1 April 1984, she died in New York City at the age of 84 years.

== Autobiography ==
Yurlova published an autobiographical trilogy:

1. Cossack Girl (1934, ASIN: B00085KMQY) covers her life from age 14 through five years of war and societal collapse. The book was reprinted in paperback in 2010 (ISBN 978-1930658707)
2. Russia, Farewell (1936, ASIN: B0006DE1X8) covers the time until her emigration to the U.S. in 1922.
3. The Only Woman (1937, ASIN: B00086103M) picks up the story of her life in the U.S.

== In popular culture ==
Yurlova's wartime experiences are described in Women Heroes of World War I: 16 Remarkable Resisters, Soldiers, Spies, and Medics by Kathryn J. Atwood.

She is one of the 14 main characters of the 2014 documentary drama series 14 - Diaries of the Great War where she is played by actress Natalia Witmer. She is also one of the main characters in the 8-part 2018 documentary drama series Clash of Futures.
