= Victor Matizen =

Russian film critic

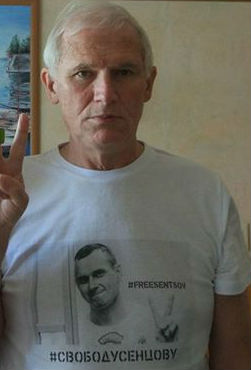
- Born: 19 February 1949 (age 77); Leningrad, RSFSR, USSR
- Occupation: film critic
- Years active: 1970–present

Victor Eduardovich Matizen (Russian: Ви́ктор Эдуа́рдович Ма́тизен; born February 19, 1949, Leningrad, USSR) is a Soviet and Russian film critic, president of the Russian Guild of Film Critics (2003–2011), chairman of the Council of Film Award White Elephant, curator of the site of the Guild kinopressa.ru.

He graduated from the Mechanics and Mathematics Department of Novosibirsk State University with a degree in Probability Theory in 1970.

Laureate of the Golden Aries Award, the State Film Fund of the Russian Federation and the Guild of Film Critics and Film Critics.

He joined the Union of Cinematographers of the Russian Federation in 1991, but in March 2009, at a meeting of filmmakers in Gostiny Dvor, he was expelled from him for criticizing the leadership of the union headed by Nikita Mikhalkov, being the only one expelled from this organization in the post-Soviet period.

In March 2014 signed the letter, We Are With You! In support of Ukraine.

In March 2022, Matizen signed a collective appeal of film critics, film historians and film journalists of Russia against Russian invasion of Ukraine.
