= Charles Edward Montague =

English journalist

Charles Edward Montague (1 January 1867 – 28 May 1928) was an English journalist, known also as a writer of novels and essays.

== Biography ==
Montague was born and brought up in London, the son of an Irish Roman Catholic priest who had left his vocation to marry. He was educated at the City of London School and Balliol College, Oxford. At Oxford he gained a First in Classical Moderations (1887) and a Second in Literae Humaniores (1889). Montague also played rugby at Oxford and was a member of the Oxford rowing team. Montague also received a Bronze Medal from the Royal Humane Society for saving a man from drowning. In 1890 he was recruited by C. P. Scott to The Manchester Guardian, where he became a leader writer and critic; while Scott was an M.P. between 1895 and 1906 he was de facto editor of the paper. He married Scott's daughter Madeline in 1898. While working at the paper, Montague became a supporter of Irish Home Rule. Montague's journalism caused some controversy due to his opposition to the Anglo-Boer War. During this time, Montague wrote William Thomas Arnold (1907), a biography of the titular journalist, with Mary Augusta Ward. Montague also produced his first novel, A Hind Let Loose (1910), a humorous novel set in the provincial newspaper business.

Montague was against World War I prior to its commencement, but once it started he believed that it was right to support it in the hope of a swift resolution. In 1914, Montague was 47, which was well over the age for enlistment. But in order to enlist, he dyed his white hair black to enable him to fool the Army into accepting him. H. W. Nevinson would later write that "Montague is the only man I know whose white hair in a single night turned dark through courage." He began as a grenadier-sergeant, and rose to lieutenant and then captain of intelligence in 1915. Later in the war, he became an armed escort for VIPs visiting the battlefield. He escorted such personalities as H. G. Wells and Bernard Shaw. After the end of World War I he wrote in a strong anti-war vein. He wrote that "War hath no fury like a non-combatant." Disenchantment (1922), a collection of newspaper articles about the war, was one of the first prose works to strongly criticise the way the war was fought, and is regarded by some as a pivotal text in the development of literature about World War I. Disenchantment criticised the British Press' coverage of the war and the conduct of the British generals. Montague accused the latter of being influenced by the "public school ethos" which he condemned as being anti-intellectual; Montague described the "public school spirit" as a "gallant, robust contempt for "swats" and "smugs" and all who invented new means to new ends and who trained and used their brains with a will".

Montague published a collection of essays, The Right Place: A Book of Pleasures (1924). This book celebrated Montague's interests, including cycling, mountaineering, and architecture.

He returned to The Manchester Guardian, but felt that his role was diminishing as the years passed. He finally retired in 1925, and settled down to become a full-time writer in the last years of his life. On a visit to London in 1928 he caught pneumonia, and he died of the illness in May 1928 at the age of 61. Montague was survived by his wife, five sons and two daughters.

Montague was the father of Evelyn Montague, the Olympic athlete and journalist depicted in the 1981 film Chariots of Fire.

== Critical reception ==
Montague's novel A Hind Let Loose was praised by H. L. Mencken. Mencken stated about the novel that "Montague manages the difficult business superbly...it is a charming and uproarious piece of buffoonery, carried on with the utmost dexterity from start to finish."

Disenchantment was praised by John Masefield in the Manchester Guardian; Masefield described the book as "one of the very best of the books which have been written about the war". Disenchantment was also lauded by H. G. Wells, George Bernard Shaw, H. M. Tomlinson, Christopher Morley, Heywood Broun and Dorothy Canfield.

Literary critic Harry Hansen lauded The Right Place as "the sort of book that one can open at dawn and at dusk, and find solace therein" and called Montague "a brilliant English journalist."

== Media portrayal ==
Charles Edward Montague is one of the 14 main characters of the series 14 - Diaries of the Great War. He is played by actor David Acton.

== Film Adaptions ==
Montague's short story "Judith" was adapted as the 1929 Hollywood film True Heaven, directed by James Tinling.

== Works ==
- The Manchester Stage, 1880-1900 (with William T. Arnold, O. Elton, and A.N. Monkhouse) (1900) reviews
- Studies of Roman imperialism (with William T. Arnold, Edward Fiddes, Humphry Ward) (1906)
- William Thomas Arnold (with Mrs. Humphry Ward, AKA Mary Augusta Ward) (1907) biography
- A Hind Let Loose (1910), a novel
- Dramatic Values (1910), reviews
- The Morning's War (1913), a novel
- The Front Line (illustrated by Muirhead Bone) (1916) non-fiction
- The Western Front (illustrated by Muirhead Bone, introduction by Gen. Sir Douglas Haig) (1917) non-fiction
- Disenchantment (1922), essays [thoughts on the First World War]
- Fiery Particles (1923), short stories
- The Right Place (1924), travel writing
- Rough Justice (1926), a novel
- Right off the Map (1927), a science fiction novel
- Action (1928), short stories
- A Writer's Notes on His Trade (1930)
- "Two or Three Witnesses", a short story
