= Bobby Kennedy for President =

American documentary television series

- Genre: Documentary
- Directed by: Dawn Porter
- No. of seasons: 1
- No. of episodes: 4

Production
- Executive producers: Nestan Behrens; Ben Cotner; Gunnar Dedio; Adam Del Deo; Jon Kamen; Laura Michalchyshyn; Lisa Nishimura; Dawn Porter; Dave Sirulnick; Justin Wilkes
- Cinematography: Bob Richman
- Running time: 58–65 minutes
- Production companies: RadicalMedia; LOOKSfilm; Trilogy Films

Original release
- Network: Netflix
- Release: April 27, 2018

Bobby Kennedy for President is an American documentary television series that focuses on United States Senator Robert F. Kennedy and his political rise in the 1960s. The four-part first series was released on Netflix on April 27, 2018.

The series, run by director and executive producer Dawn Porter, looks at Kennedy's political lore, including his 1968 presidential campaign, which ended with his assassination on June 5, 1968 at the Ambassador Hotel in Los Angeles, California. The show uses archival footage during Kennedy's time as Attorney General and Senator, as well as conversations he had with his brothers, United States President John F. Kennedy and United States Senator Ted Kennedy.

In addition to archival footage, the show interviews dozens of individuals who, at one point, were in Kennedy's circle, including Rep. John Lewis, Dolores Huerta, Harry Belafonte, Marian Wright Edelman, and William vanden Heuvel.

== Episodes ==
No.	Title	Original release date
1	"A New Generation"	April 27, 2018
Robert F. Kennedy works on his brother John F. Kennedy's presidential campaign in 1960.
2	"I'd Like to Serve"	April 27, 2018
Following his brother's assassination, Kennedy is elected to the U.S. Senate from New York in 1964.
3	"You Only Get One Time Around"	April 27, 2018
Kennedy begins his run for president, until he is assassinated at the Ambassador Hotel in Los Angeles three months into his campaign .
4	"Justice for Bobby"	April 27, 2018
After Kennedy's assassination, his family, friends, and supporters mourn, and his assassin stands trial.

== See also ==
- Robert F. Kennedy in media
- Cultural depictions of John F. Kennedy
