= Ethel Cooper =

Australian musician and diarist

Caroline Ethel Cooper (25 December 1871 – 25 May 1961) was an Australian musician and diarist best known for the weekly letters she wrote to her sister Emmie in Australia while she was trapped behind enemy lines in Leipzig during World War I.

== Early life ==
Cooper was born in Adelaide in 1871, the daughter of Arthur Cooper the deputy surveyor general and Harriette Cooper (née Woodcock) a music teacher. Cooper attended Miss Annie Montgomerie Martin's progressive school and studied music under I. G. Reimann.

== Musical career ==
Ethel Cooper played the trombone and piano. She travelled to Leipzig to continue her music studies from 1897 to 1906. She returned to Adelaide and played trombone in visiting orchestras at the Theatre Royal and formed a Women's Orchestra.

== WW1 and Letter writing ==
Cooper returned to Leipzig and documented her experiences living in wartime Germany from 31 July 1914 and 1 December 1918 in 227 weekly letters to her sister. She was living in Leipzig when the war started, and she chose to stay. As the war dragged on, she tried to leave but was forbidden. She was denounced by neighbours as a spy on several occasions but in each case she talked her way out and remained free. Despite being confined as an alien to Leipzig, she covertly travelled into the countryside and even to a military barracks. Ethel Cooper also visited Allied POWs held in Germany and attended German military hospitals for wounded soldiers. It was not possible to post her letters back to Australia, so the first 52 were smuggled to Switzerland. The rest of the letters were hidden in music scores and furniture until she could send them from England in 1918.

Cooper's sister, Emmie, later deposited the letters in the State Library of South Australia's collection.

Cooper returned to Adelaide following the war before returning to Europe to help with relief work in Poland and Greece.

== Media Portrayal ==
Ethel Cooper is one of the 14 main characters of the series 14 - Diaries of the Great War. She is played by actress Megan Gay.

== Memorials ==
- The Ethel Cooper Scholarship for Pianoforte at University of Adelaide. was established by her biographer Decie Denholm in 1982 for a student studying the piano.

== Personal life ==
Cooper never married. Caroline Ethel Cooper died on 25 May 1961 in Malvern, Australia at the age of 90.
