= Dirk Schneider =

German film director and author (born 1968)

Dirk Schneider (born in 1968) is a German film director and author.

== Life and career ==
Dirk Schneider studied journalism in Leipzig and worked as an author during this time. In the early 1990s, he collaborated with Ariane Riecker and Annett Schwarz to produce the following non-fiction books: Stasi intim. Gespräche mit ehemaligen MfS-Angehörigen (Talking to former MfS officials) (1990) and Laienspieler : sechs Politikerporträts (Amateur players: six political portraits) : Peter-Michael Diestel, Gregor Gysi, Regine Hildebrandt, Günther Krause, Wolfgang Thierse, Konrad Weiss : and an interview with Friedrich Schorlemmer (1991).

Schneider then went into advertising. He was the owner and creative director of an advertising agency in Leipzig for ten years, but returned to film in 2005. First as co-author, then (since 2009) as author and director, he makes political and historical documentaries, reports, feature films and image films for various institutions and TV stations. His main topics are usually recent history of the GDR and Germany after the fall of the Berlin Wall.

== Filmography ==
- 2005: Seine Hoheit ist zurück
- 2005: OP am grünen Herzen
- 2006: Oberhof: Weiße Pracht und große Pläne
- 2008: Volkszählung in der Antarktis
- 2008: Mission Antarktis
- 2009: Wie der Stahl gehärtet wurde. Die Maxhütte Unterwellenborn.
- 2010: Die Tornado-Katastrophe von Großenhain
- 2010: Das Ende des Farbfilms. AGFA, ORWO und die DDR.
- 2011: Blackout. Der Stromkollaps des 4. November 2006
- 2011: Die Brücke zu Nienburg.
- 2011: Hans Zimmer. Der Sound für Hollywood
- 2011: Das Ende in der Schaukurve.
- 2017: Geheimnisvolle Orte. Der Grenzbahnhof Probstzella
- 2017: Wer bezahlt den Osten?
- 2017: Schneekopf: Hochposten im Thüringer Wald
- 2018: Wer braucht den Osten?
- 2018: Bischofferode. Das Treuhand-Trauma
- 2020: Was will der Osten
- 2023: Tschernobyl – Die Katastrophe
- 2025: Der Gigant - Die legendäre Antonov

== Awards ==
- Ernst-Schneider-Preis 2012 (for: Stromkollaps)
- Preis der Friedrich- und Isabell-Vogelstiftung für herausragenden Wirtschaftsjournalismus 2017, together with Ariane Riecker (for: Wer bezahlt den Osten?)
- Medienpreis Mittelstand 2018, together with Ariane Riecker (for: Wer bezahlt den Osten?)
- Preis der Friedrich- und Isabell-Vogelstiftung für herausragenden Wirtschaftsjournalismus 2018, together with Ariane Riecker (for: Wer braucht den Osten?)

== Books ==
- Stasi intim. Gespräche mit ehemaligen MfS-Angehörigen, Leipzig, Forum 1990, ISBN 9783861510086
- Laienspieler : sechs Politikerporträts : Peter-Michael Diestel, Gregor Gysi, Regine Hildebrandt, Günther Krause, Wolfgang Thierse, Konrad Weiss : und ein Interview mit Friedrich Schorlemmer, Leipzig, Forum 1991, ISBN 9783861510239
