= Maarten van der Duin =

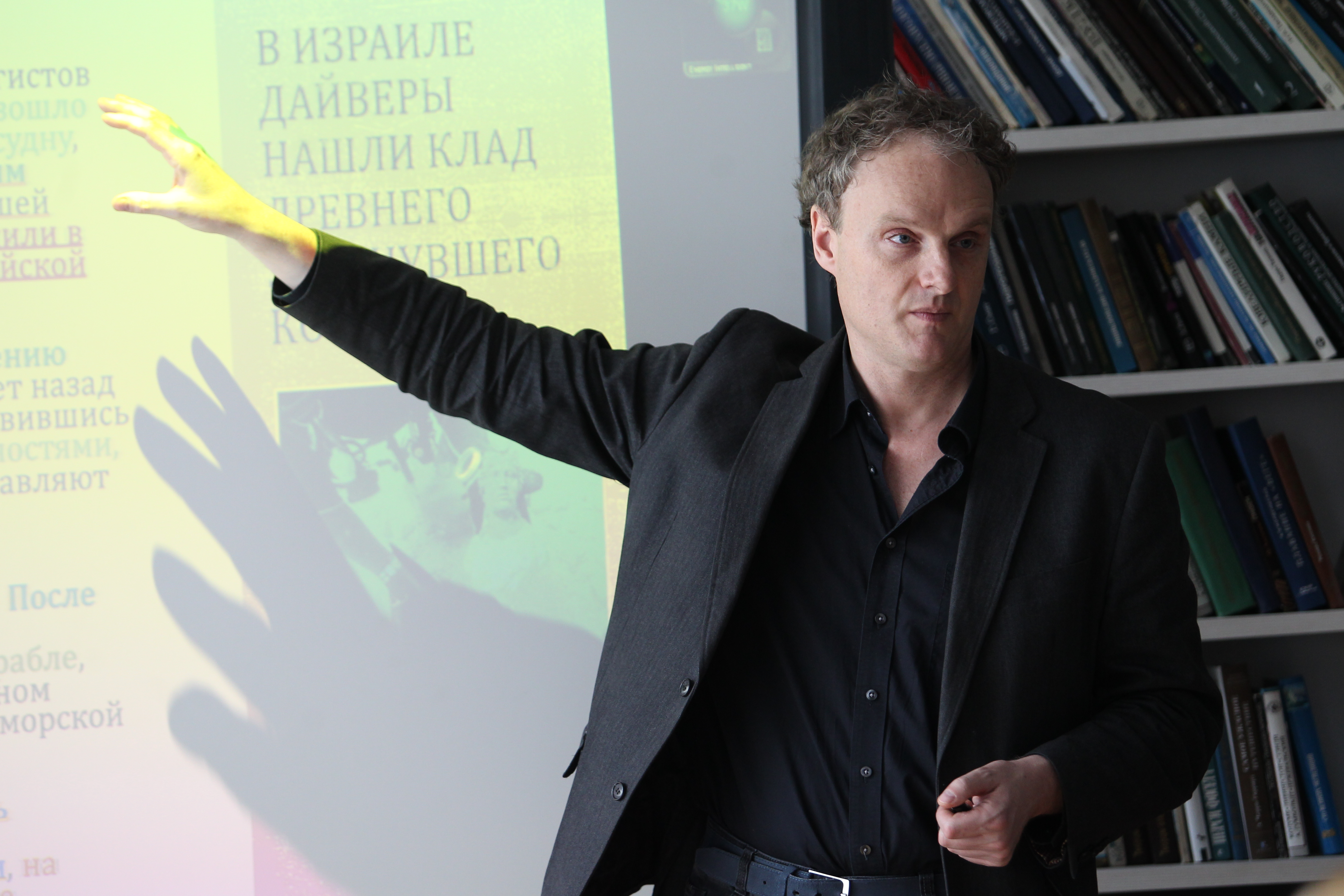
- Maarten van der Duin in 2016
- Born: January 9, 1967 (age 58); IJmuiden, Netherlands
- Education: Leiden University; Russian Institute of Theatre Arts
- Occupation(s): Screenwriter; Stage director creative consultant
- Years active: 1999-present
- Notable work: The Story of the Netherlands; 13 in de oorlog Rozengeur & Wodka Lime
- Awards: Prix Jeunesse International; Weisser Elefant; Goldener Spatz; Beeld & Geluid Award; Gouden Televizierring

Maarten Laurens van der Duin (Dutch: [ˈmaːrtə(n) ˈlʌurəns fɑn dər ˈdœyn]; born 9 January 1967) is a Dutch scriptwriter, stage director and creative consultant.

== Education ==
After graduating from Leiden University in Slavic Languages and Soviet Studies, Van der Duin completed a director's internship at the Ludwik Solski Academy for the Dramatic Arts and studied Polish at the Polonia Research Institute of the Jagiellonian University in Cracow, Poland. After two years, Van der Duin left for Russia to study directing at the State Institute for Theatre Arts (GITIS) in Moscow. In his second year of study he switched to The Moscow School of Dramatic Art of renowned director Anatoly Vasiliev. After his studies, Van der Duin staged theatre plays between 1996 and 1997 at the Moscow State Drama and Comedy Theatre in Noginsk and the Yakutsk State Academic Drama Theatre in the Republic of Sakha (Yakutia).

== Theatre ==
In 1998, Van der Duin produced a festival of Russian classics at the King's Head Theatre, London, for which he translated two Russian plays into English (The Suicide by Nikolai Erdman and Maria by Isaac Babel) and also directed the latter. Apart from that, he did an internship at the English National Opera and the Dutch National Opera, and assisted director Hans Croiset of theatre company Het Toneel Speelt. Until 2003, Van der Duin participated as an assistant director in multiple opera productions at the Dorset Opera Festival in Sherborne, England. Nearly every summer since 2016, he directs operas, that are subsequently performed by conductor Stephen Ellery at festivals in Cardiff, Brighton, Frome and London. La serva padrona by Giovanni Battista Pergolesi in 2016 was followed by La Zingaretta by Leonardo Leo in 2017 and Bastien and Bastienne by Mozart and the Coffee Cantata by Johann Sebastian Bach in 2018.

== Filmography ==
Year	Title	Position	Broadcaster
2023	The Story of Orange-Nassau	Script (6 episodes)	NTR
2021	The Story of the Netherlands	Script (10 episodes)	NTR
2017	Kids of Courage	Dramaturgie & scenario (3 episodes)	SWR, BBC Alba
2016	Generation of Change	Script & direction	MDR, Arte
2015	Vater, Mutter, Hitler	Script	NDR, SWR (ARD)
2015	Erich Mielke, Master of Fear	Script & direction (in collaboration with Jens Becker)	MDR, Arte
2013	Small Hands in a Big War	Script (8 episodes)	NTR, Arte, SRF, S4C, UR, BBC Alba
2013	14 - Diaries of the Great War	Treatments (2 episodes) & script doctor	Arte, SWR, NDR, WDR, ORF, NTR & BBC
2011	Moordvrouw	Format & script (4 episodes)	RTL 4
2011	De slavernij junior	Script (6 episodes)	NTR
2009	Flikken Maastricht	Script (3 episodes)	TROS
2009	13 in de oorlog	Script (13 episodes)	NTR
2009	Het klokhuis	Script (many skits)	NTR
2008	Salto Mortale (film)	Script	NPS
2007	Sportlets	Script (13 episodes)	Nickelodeon
2007	Spoorloos Verdwenen	Treatments (10 episodes) & script (1 episode)	AVRO
2006	Rozengeur & Wodka Lime (season 6)	Creative Producer (13 episodes)	Tien
2005	Dankert & Dankert	Script (2 episodes)	Omrop Fryslân
2005	Moeders & Dochters (pilot)	Script	KRO
2005	Rozengeur & Wodka Lime (season 1-5)	Script, supervision, final editing (65 episodes)	RTL 4
2003	Het Glazen Huis	Format	AVRO, TROS & BNN
2002	Trauma 24/7	Format & script (4 episodes)	Net 5
2000	Westenwind (season 1-6)	Script editing (26 episodes), final editing (26 episodes), script (6 episodes)	RTL 4

== Awards and nominations ==
Year	Award	Production	Result
2022	Guidinc. Streaming Video Award	The Story of the Netherlands	Won
2020	Prix Jeunesse International	Kids of Courage	Won
2020	Deutscher Hörfilmpreis	Kids of Courage	Won
2019	Der Weisse Elefant	Kids of Courage	Won
2019	International Emmy Awards	Kids of Courage	Nominated
2019	Japan Prize	Kids of Courage	Nominated
2020	Grimme-Preis	Kids of Courage	Nominated
2019	Rockie Awards	Kids of Courage	Nominated
2018	Goldener Spatz	Kids of Courage	Won
2014	Japan Prize	Small Hands in a Big War	Nominated
2014	Gouden K	Small Hands in a Big War	Nominated
2014	Robert Geisendörfer Preis	14 - Diaries of the Great War	Won
2014	Deutscher Fernsehpreis	14 - Diaries of the Great War	Nominated
2014	Japan Prize	14 - Diaries of the Great War	Nominated
2010	Japan Prize	13 in de oorlog	Nominated
2010	International Emmy Awards	13 in de oorlog	Nominated
2011	BaKaForum Youth Jury Prize	13 in de oorlog	Won
2010	Prix Jeunesse International	13 in de oorlog	Nominated
2010	Beeld & Geluid Award	13 in de oorlog	Won
2004	Gouden Beelden	Rozengeur & Wodka Lime (4th season)	Nominated
2000	Gouden Televizierring	Westenwind	Won
1999	Gouden Televizierring	Westenwind	Nominated
