= Ivan Elagin =

Ivan Elagin may refer to:

- Ivan Elagin (poet) (1918–1987), Russian émigré poet
- Ivan Yelagin (1725–1794), Russian historian, amateur poet and translator

== See also ==
- Yelagin (surname)
