= Lev Ozerov =

Russian-Jewish poet, translator and essayist

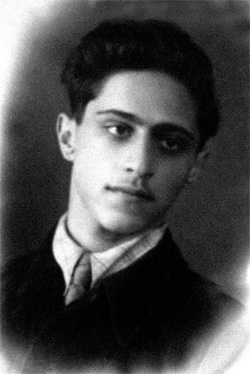
Lev Ozerov, World War II

Lev Ozerov (Russian: Лев Адольфович Озеров) (August 10/23, 1914 – March 18, 1996) was a Russian-Jewish poet, translator and essayist born in Kiev. Ozerov was the professor of Literary Translation at the Literary Institute until his death. He was one of the first Jewish authors who wrote poems about Babi Yar along with Liudmila Titova and Leonid Pervomayskiy. He visited that place of martyrology of Ukrainian Jews in Kiev immediately after the liberation. His famous epic "Babi Yar" first appeared in the Октябрь (October) (ru) magazine March–April 1946 issue. Ozerov served as poetry editor of October (Октябрь) magazine in 1946–1948, (Note: Shrayer (2010), p.85; ibidem.) one of the more important literary publications at the time.

Originally Ozerov published under his own name Leo Goldberg, as well as pen-names Leo Berg and L Kornev. He wrote several books and numerous articles on Russian and Ukrainian poetry including on Anna Akhmatova among others. His "Poems of Anna Akhmatova" article published on June 23, 1959 in the Literaturnaya Gazeta, was the first review of her poetry after years of silence. Ozerov did much to preserve the creative heritage of poets of his own generation who perished in the years of Stalinist repressions. He died in Moscow.

A first English edition of Ozerov's Portrait Without Frames (Портреты без рам, 1999), edited by Robert Chandler and Boris Dralyuk, was published by Granta in November 2018, and by New York Review Books in December 2018.
