= History of the Soviet Union (1927–1953) =

Stalinist Era
- 1927–1953
| History of Soviet Russia and the Soviet Union (1917–1927) | History of the Soviet Union (1953–1964) |
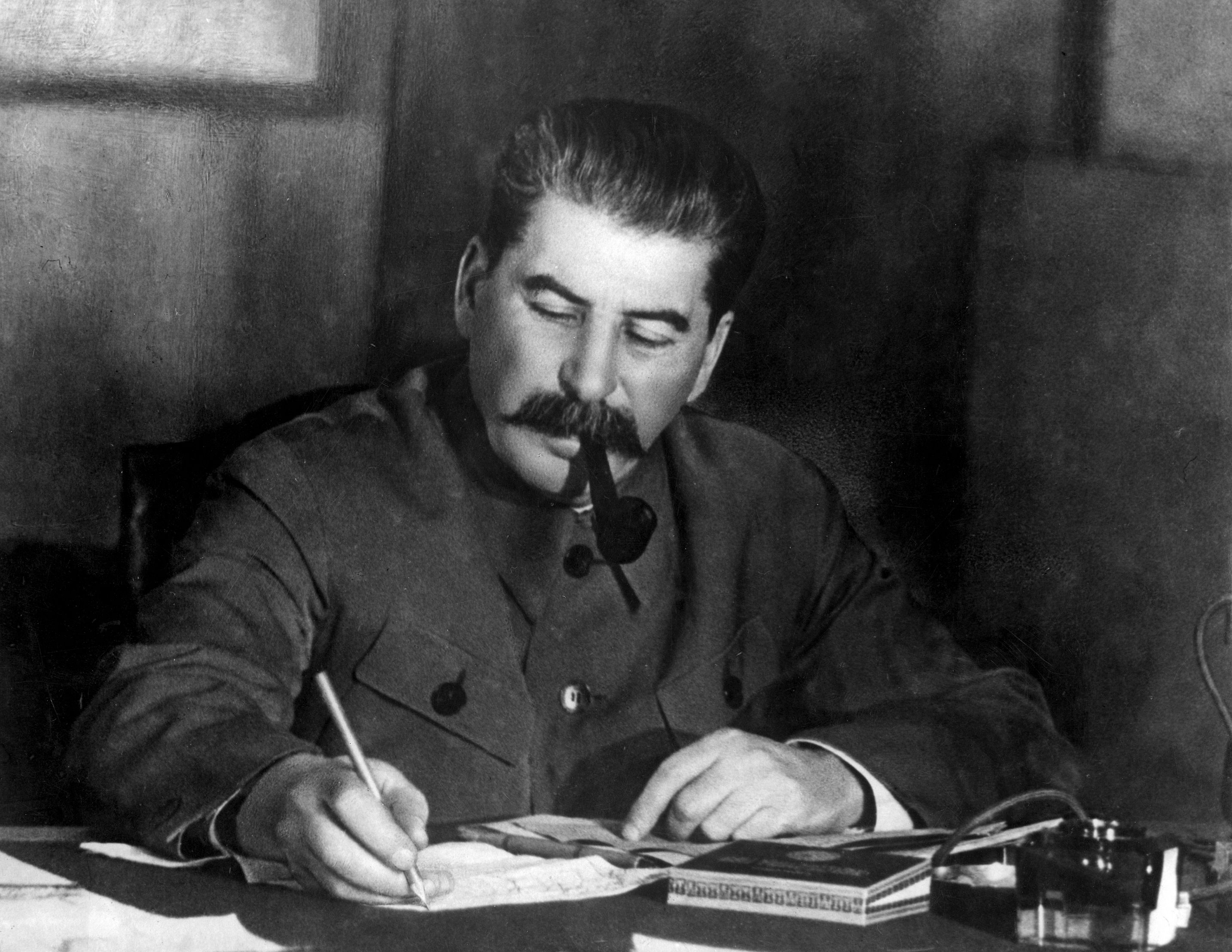
- Joseph Stalin led the Soviet Union during the era.
- Location: Soviet Union
- Including: World War II, Cold War
- Leader: Joseph Stalin
- Key events: Industrialization in the Soviet Union; The Great Purge; Holodomor; Kazakh Famine; Spanish Civil War; Polish Operation of the NKVD; World War II; Occupation of the Baltic states Winter War; Molotov–Ribbentrop Pact; Great Patriotic War; Population transfer in the Soviet Union; Anglo-Soviet invasion of Iran; Battle of Berlin; Soviet invasion of Manchuria; Chinese Civil War; 1944 Bulgarian coup d'état Division of Korea; Division of Germany; Turkish Straits crisis 1948 Czechoslovak coup d'état 1948 Arab–Israeli War; Berlin Blockade; Tito–Stalin split Korean War; Death and state funeral of Joseph Stalin

The history of the Soviet Union between 1927 and 1953, commonly referred to as the Stalin Era or the Stalinist Era, covers the period in Soviet history from the establishment of Stalinism through victory in the Second World War and down to the death of Joseph Stalin in 1953. Stalin sought to destroy his enemies while transforming Soviet society with central planning, in particular through the forced collectivization of agriculture and rapid development of heavy industry. Stalin consolidated his power within the party and the state and fostered an extensive cult of personality. Soviet secret-police and the mass-mobilization of the Communist Party served as Stalin's major tools in molding Soviet society. Stalin's methods in achieving his goals, which included party purges, ethnic cleansings, political repression of the general population, and forced collectivization, led to millions of deaths: in Gulag labor camps and during famine.

World War II, known as "the Great Patriotic War" by Soviet historians, devastated much of the USSR, with about one out of every three World War II deaths representing a citizen of the Soviet Union. In the course of World War II, the Soviet Union's armies occupied Eastern Europe, where they established or supported Communist puppet governments. By 1949, the Cold War had started between the Western Bloc and the Eastern (Soviet) Bloc, with the Warsaw Pact (created 1955) pitched against NATO (created 1949) in Europe. After 1945, Stalin did not directly engage in any wars, continuing his totalitarian rule until his death in 1953.

== Soviet state's development ==
=== Industrialization in practice ===
The mobilization of resources by state planning expanded the country's industrial base. From 1928 to 1932, pig iron output, necessary for further development of the industrial infrastructure rose from 3.3 million to 6.2 million tons per year. Coal production, a basic fuel of modern economies and Stalinist industrialization, rose from 35.4 million to 64 million tons, and the output of iron ore rose from 5.7 million to 19 million tons. A number of industrial complexes such as Magnitogorsk and Kuznetsk, the Moscow and Gorky automobile plants, the Ural Mountains and Kramatorsk heavy machinery plants, and Kharkiv, Stalingrad and Chelyabinsk tractor plants had been built or were under construction.

In real terms, the workers' standards of living tended to drop, rather than rise during industrialization. Stalin's laws to "tighten work discipline" made the situation worse: e.g., a 1932 change to the RSFSR labor law code enabled firing workers who had been absent without a reason from the workplace for just one day. Being fired accordingly meant losing "the right to use ration and commodity cards" as well as the "loss of the right to use an apartment″ and even blacklisted for new employment which altogether meant a threat of starving. Those measures, however, were not fully enforced, as managers were hard-pressed to replace these workers. In contrast, the 1938 legislation, which introduced labor books, followed by major revisions of the labor law, was enforced. For example, being absent or even 20 minutes late were grounds for becoming fired; managers who failed to enforce these laws faced criminal prosecution. Later, the Decree of the Presidium of the Supreme Soviet, 26 June 1940 "On the Transfer to the Eight-Hour Working Day, the Seven-day Work Week, and on the Prohibition of Unauthorized Departure by Laborers and Office Workers from Factories and Offices" replaced the 1938 revisions with obligatory criminal penalties for quitting a job (2–4 months imprisonment), for being late 20 minutes (6 months of probation and pay confiscation of 25 per cent), etc.

Based on these figures, the Soviet government declared that the Five Year Industrial Production Plan had been fulfilled by 93.7% in only four years, while parts devoted to the heavy industry parts were fulfilled by 108%. Stalin in December 1932 declared the plan success to the Central Committee since increases in the output of coal and iron would fuel future development.

During the Second Five-Year Plan (1933–1937), on the basis of the huge investment during the first plan, the industry expanded extremely rapidly and nearly reached the plan's targets. By 1937, coal output was 127 million tons, pig iron 14.5 million tons, and there had been very rapid development of the armaments industry.

While making a massive leap in industrial capacity, the First Five Year Plan was extremely harsh on industrial workers; quotas were difficult to fulfill, requiring that miners put in 16- to 18-hour workdays. Failure to fulfill quotas could result in treason charges. Working conditions were poor, even hazardous. Due to the allocation of resources for the industry along with decreasing productivity since collectivization, a famine occurred. In the construction of the industrial complexes, inmates of Gulag camps were used as expendable resources. But conditions improved rapidly during the second plan. Throughout the 1930s, industrialization was combined with a rapid expansion of technical and engineering education as well as increasing emphasis on munitions.

From 1922 until 1953, the police state operated at high intensity, seeking out anyone accused of sabotaging the system. The estimated numbers vary greatly. Perhaps, 3.7 million people were sentenced for alleged counter-revolutionary crimes, including 600,000 sentenced to death, 2.4 million sentenced to labor camps, and 700,000 sentenced to expatriation. Stalinist repression reached its peak during the Great Purge of 1937–1938, which removed many skilled managers and experts and considerably slowed industrial production in 1937.

== Economy ==
=== Collectivization of agriculture ===
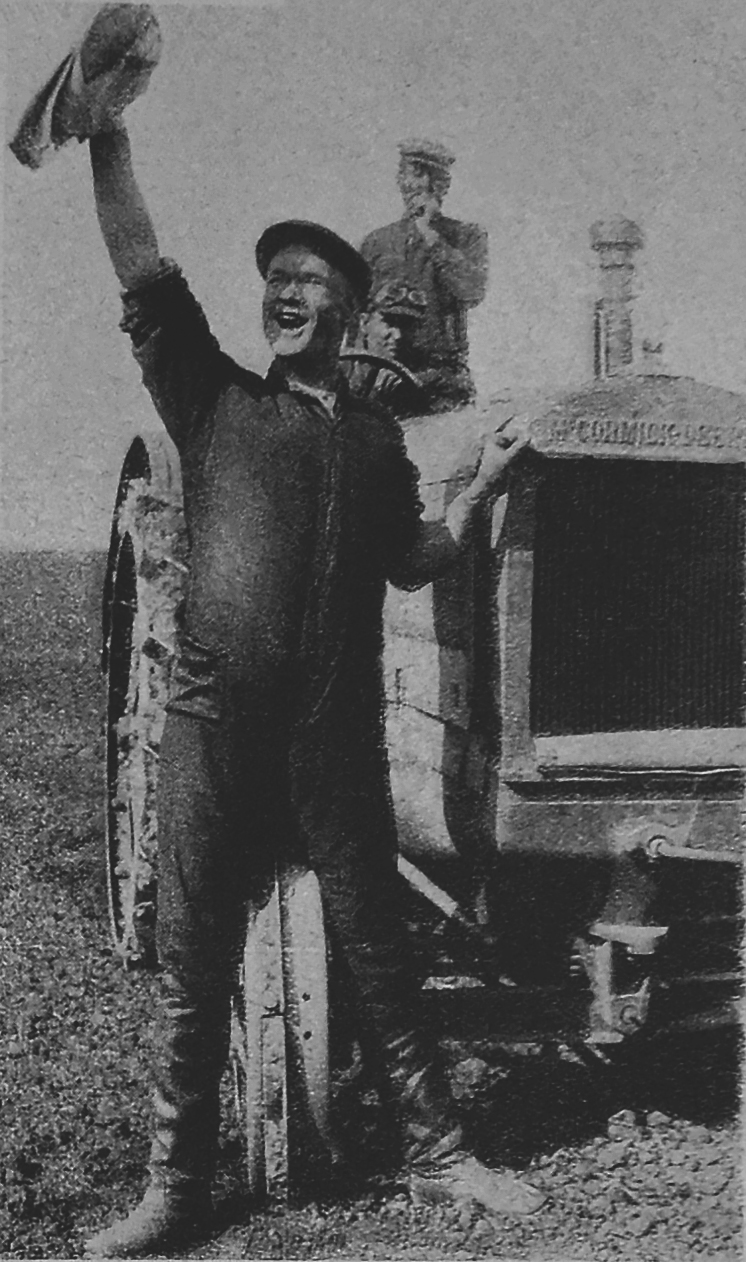
Propaganda shows the use of tractors (in this case McCormick-Deering 15–30) as a backbone of collectivization. Soviet Ukraine, 1931

Under the NEP (New Economic Policy), Lenin had to tolerate the continued existence of privately owned agriculture. He decided to wait at least 20 years before attempting to place it under state control and in the meantime concentrate on industrial development. However, after Stalin's rise to power, the timetable for collectivization was shortened to just five years. Demand for food intensified, especially in the USSR's primary grain producing regions, with new, forced approaches implemented. Upon joining kolkhozes (collective farms), peasants had to give up their private plots of land and property. Every harvest, Kolkhoz production was sold to the state for a low price set by the state itself. However, the natural progress of collectivization was slow, and the November 1929 Plenum of the Central Committee decided to accelerate collectivization through force. In any case, Russian peasant culture formed a bulwark of traditionalism that stood in the way of the Soviet state's goals.

Given the goals of the first Five-Year Plan, the state sought increased political control of agriculture in order to feed the rapidly growing urban population and to obtain a source of foreign currency through increased cereal exports. Given its late start, the USSR needed to import a substantial number of the expensive technologies necessary for heavy industrialization.

By 1936, about 90% of Soviet agriculture had been collectivized. In many cases, peasants bitterly opposed this process and often slaughtered their animals rather than give them to collective farms, even though the government only wanted the grain. Kulaks, prosperous peasants, were forcibly resettled to Kazakhstan, Siberia and the Russian Far North (a large portion of the kulaks served at forced labor camps). However, just about anyone opposing collectivization was deemed a "kulak". The policy of liquidation of kulaks as a class—formulated by Stalin at the end of 1929—meant some executions, and even more deportation to special settlements and, sometimes, to forced labor camps.

Despite the expectations, collectivization led to a catastrophic drop in farm productivity, which did not return to the levels achieved under the NEP until 1940. The upheaval associated with collectivization was particularly severe in Ukraine and the heavily Ukrainian Volga region. Peasants slaughtered their livestock en masse rather than give them up. In 1930 alone, 25% of the nation's cattle, sheep, and goats, and one-third of all pigs were killed. It was not until the 1980s that the Soviet livestock numbers would return to their 1928 level. Government bureaucrats, who had been given a rudimentary education on farming techniques, were dispatched to the countryside to "teach" peasants the new ways of socialist agriculture, relying largely on theoretical ideas that had little basis in reality. Even after the state inevitably won and succeeded in imposing collectivization, the peasants did everything they could in the way of sabotage. They cultivated far smaller portions of their land and worked much less. The scale of the Ukrainian famine has led many Ukrainian scholars to argue that there was a deliberate policy of genocide against the Ukrainian people. Other scholars argue that the massive death totals were an inevitable result of a very poorly planned operation against all peasants, who had given little support to Lenin or Stalin.

Almost 99% of all cultivated land had been pulled into collective farms by the end of 1937. The ghastly price paid by the peasantry has yet to be established with precision, but probably up to 5 million people died of persecution or starvation in these years. Ukrainians and Kazakhs suffered worse than most nations.

— Robert Service, Comrades! A History of World Communism (2007) p. 145

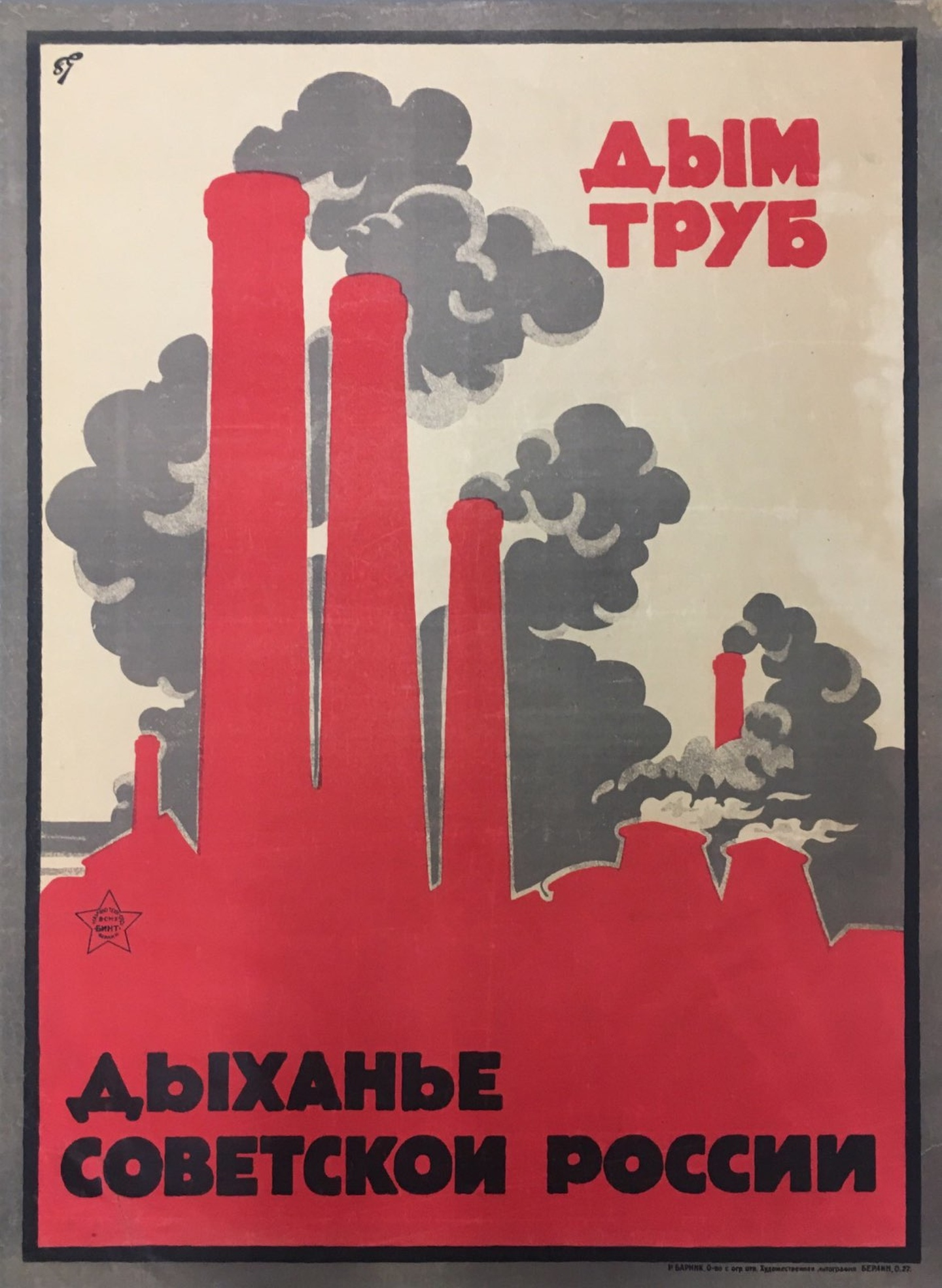
Early Soviet poster: The smoke of chimneys is the breath of Soviet Russia

In Ukraine alone, the number of people who died in the famines is now estimated to be 3.5 million.

The USSR took over Estonia, Latvia and Lithuania in 1940, which were lost to Germany in 1941, and then recovered in 1944. The collectivization of their farms began in 1948. Using terror, mass killings and deportations, most of the peasantry was collectivized by 1952. Agricultural production fell dramatically in all the other Soviet Republics.

=== Rapid industrialization ===
In the period of rapid industrialization and mass collectivization preceding World War II, Soviet employment figures experienced exponential growth. 3.9 million jobs per annum were expected by 1923, but the number actually climbed to an astounding 6.4 million. By 1937, the number rose yet again, to about 7.9 million. Finally, in 1940 it reached 8.3 million. Between 1926 and 1930, the urban population increased by 30 million. Unemployment had been a problem in late Imperial Russia and even under the NEP, but it ceased being a major factor after the implementation of Stalin's massive industrialization program. The sharp mobilization of resources used in order to industrialize the heretofore agrarian society created a massive need for labor; unemployment virtually dropped to zero. Wage setting by Soviet planners also contributed to the sharp decrease in unemployment, which dropped in real terms by 50% from 1928 to 1940. With wages artificially depressed, the state could afford to employ far more workers than would be financially viable in a market economy. Several ambitious extraction projects were begun that endeavored to supply raw materials for both military hardware and consumer goods.

The Moscow and Gorky automobile plants produced automobiles for the public—despite few Soviet citizens being able to afford a car—and the expansion of steel production and other industrial materials made the manufacture of a greater number of cars possible. Car and truck production, for example, reached 200,000 in 1931.

A minimum wage of 110–115 rubles was established in 1937; private gardens were allowed for one million workers to farm in their private plots. Even so, most Soviet workers lived in crowded communal housings and dormitories and suffered from extreme poverty.

== Society ==
=== Propaganda ===
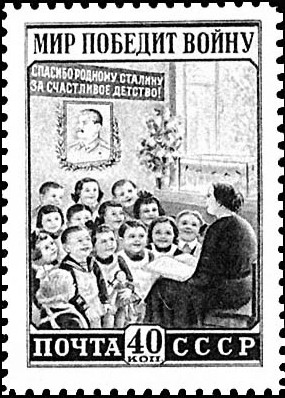
1950 postage stamp: a class of schoolchildren. On a banner on the wall is written, "Thank you, dear Stalin, for our happy childhood!"

Most of the top communist leaders in the 1920s and 1930s had been propagandists or editors before 1917, and were keenly aware of the importance of propaganda. As soon as they gained power in 1917 they seized the monopoly of all communication media, and greatly expanded their propaganda apparatus in terms of newspapers, magazines and pamphlets. Radio became a powerful tool in the 1930s. Stalin, for example, has been an editor of Pravda. Besides the national newspapers Pravda and Izvestia, there were numerous regional publications as well as newspapers and magazines and all the important languages. Ironclad uniformity of opinion was the norm during the Soviet era. Typewriters and printing presses were closely controlled until the late 1980s to prevent unauthorized publications. Samizdat illegal circulation of subversive fiction and nonfiction was brutally suppressed. The rare exceptions to 100% uniformity in the official media were indicators of high-level battles. The Soviet draft constitution of 1936 was an instance. Pravda and Trud (the paper for manual workers) praised the draft constitution. However Izvestiia was controlled by Nikolai Bukharin and it published negative letters and reports. Bukharin won out and the party line changed and started to attack "Trotskyite" oppositionists and traitors. Bukharin's success was short-lived; he was arrested in 1937, given a show trial and executed.

=== Education ===
Industrial workers needed to be educated in order to be competitive and so embarked on a program contemporaneous with industrialization to greatly increase the number of schools and the general quality of education. In 1927, 7.9 million students attended 118,558 schools. By 1933, the number rose to 9.7 million students in 166,275 schools. In addition, 900 specialist departments and 566 institutions were built and fully operational by 1933. Literacy rates increased substantially as a result, especially in the Central Asian republics.

=== Women ===
The Soviet people also benefited from a type of social liberalization. Women were to be given the same education as men and, at least legally speaking, obtained the same rights as men in the workplace. Although in practice these goals were not reached, the efforts to achieve them and the statement of theoretical equality led to a general improvement in the socio-economic status of women.

Women were notably recruited as clerks for the expanding department stores, resulting in a "feminization" of department stores as the number of female sales staff rose from 45 percent of the total sales staff in 1935 to 62 percent of the total sales staff in 1938. This was in part due to a propaganda campaign launched in 1931 which linked femininity with "culture" and asserted that the New Soviet Woman was also a working woman. Furthermore, department store staff had a low status in the Soviet Union and many men did not want to work as sales staff, leading to the jobs as sales staff going to poorly educated working-class women and from women newly arrived in the cities from the countryside.

However, many rights were rolled back by the authorities during this era, such as abortion, which was legalized before Stalin came to power, was banned in 1936 after controversial debate among citizens. Women's issues were also largely ignored by the government.

=== Health ===
Stalinist development also contributed to advances in health care, which marked a massive improvement over the Imperial era. Stalin's policies granted the Soviet people access to free health care and education. Widespread immunization programs created the first generation free from the fear of typhus and cholera. The occurrences of these diseases dropped to record-low numbers and infant mortality rates were substantially reduced, resulting in the life expectancy for both men and women to increase by over 20 years by the mid-to-late 1950s.

=== Youth ===
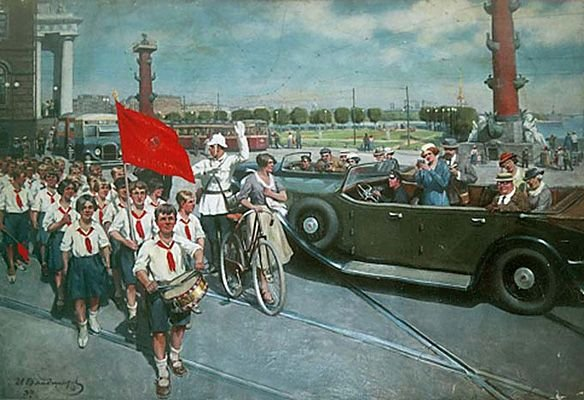
"Foreigners in Leningrad" by Ivan Vladimirov (1937), depicting Young Pioneers

The Komsomol or Youth Communist League, was an entirely new youth organization designed by Lenin became an enthusiastic strike force that organized communism across the Soviet Union often called on to attack traditional enemies. The Komsomol played an important role as a mechanism for teaching Party values to the younger generation. The Komsomol also served as a mobile pool of labor and political activism, with the ability to relocate to areas of high-priority at short notice. In the 1920s the Kremlin assigned Komsomol major responsibilities for promoting industrialization at the factory level. In 1929 7,000 Komsomol cadets were building the tractor factory in Stalingrad, 56,000 others built factories in the Urals, and 36,000 were assigned work underground in the coal mines. The goal was to provide an energetic hard-core of Bolshevik activists to influence their coworkers the factories and mines that were at the center of communist ideology.

Komsomol adopted meritocratic, supposedly class-blind membership policies in 1935, but the result was a decline in working class youth members, and a dominance by the better educated youth. A new social hierarchy emerged as young professionals and students joined the Soviet elite, displacing proletarians. Komsomol's membership policies in the 1930s reflected the broader nature of Stalinism, combining Leninist rhetoric about class-free progress with Stalinist pragmatism focused on getting the most enthusiastic and skilled membership. Under Stalin, the death penalty was also extended to adolescents as young as 12 years old in 1935.

=== Modernity ===
Urban women under Stalin, paralleling the modernization of western countries, were also the first generation of women able to give birth in a hospital with access to prenatal care. Education was another area in which there was improvement after economic development, also paralleling other western countries. The generation born during Stalin's rule was the first near-universally literate generation. Some engineers were sent abroad to learn industrial technology, and hundreds of foreign engineers were brought to Russia on contract. Transport links were also improved, as many new railways were built, although with forced labour, costing thousands of lives. Workers who exceeded their quotas, Stakhanovites, received many incentives for their work, although many such workers were in fact "arranged" to succeed by receiving extreme help in their work, and then their achievements were used for propaganda.

=== Religion ===
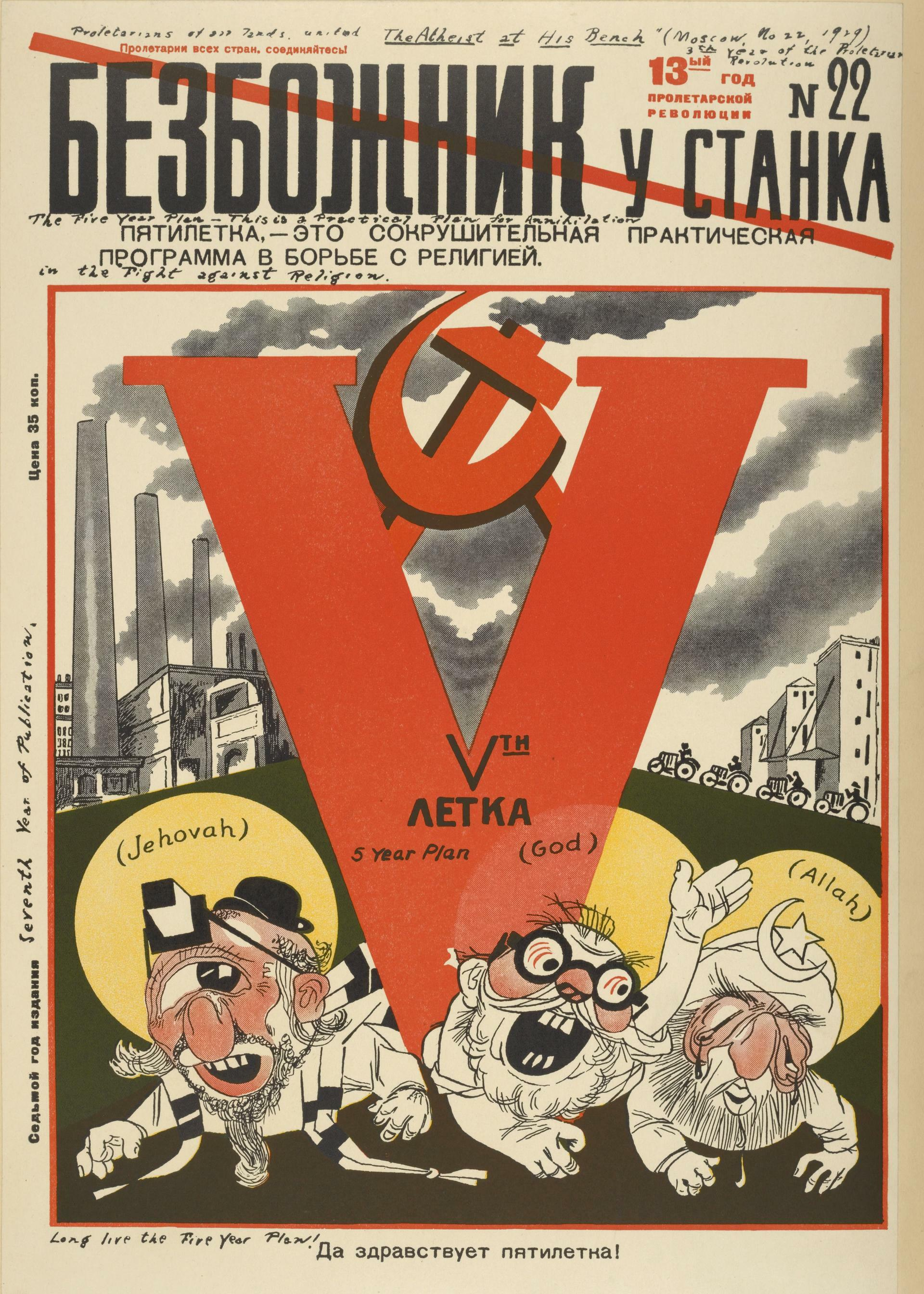
Cover of Bezbozhnik in 1929, magazine of the Society of the Godless. The first five-year plan of the Soviet Union is shown crushing the gods of the Abrahamic religions.

The systematic attacks on the Russian Orthodox Church began as soon as the Bolsheviks took power in 1917. In the 1930s, Stalin intensified his war on organized religion. Nearly all churches and monasteries were closed and tens of thousands of clergymen were imprisoned or executed. An estimated 5,000 to 10,000 Orthodox clergy died by execution or in prison 1918–1929, plus an additional 45,000 in 1930–1939. Monks, nuns, and related personnel added an additional 40,000 dead.

The state propaganda machine vigorously promoted atheism and denounced religion as being an artifact of capitalist society. In 1937, Pope Pius XI decried the attacks on religion in the Soviet Union. By 1940, only a small number of churches remained open. The early anti-religious campaigns under Lenin were mostly directed at the Russian Orthodox Church, as it was a symbol of the czarist government. In the 1930s however, all faiths were targeted: minority Christian denominations, Islam, Judaism, and Buddhism. During World War II state authorities eased pressures on Religion in Russia and stopped prosecuting the church. The Orthodox Church was, therefore, able to help the Soviet Army to defend Russia. Religions in former USSR republics revived and once again flourished after the fall of communism in the 1990s. As Paul Froese explains:

Atheists waged a 70-year war on religious belief in the Soviet Union. The Communist Party destroyed churches, mosques, and temples; it executed religious leaders; it flooded the schools and media with anti-religious propaganda; and it introduced a belief system called “scientific atheism,” complete with atheist rituals, proselytizers, and a promise of worldly salvation. But in the end, a majority of older Soviet citizens retained their religious beliefs and a crop of citizens too young to have experienced pre-Soviet times acquired religious beliefs.

According to 2012 official statistics, nearly 15% of ethnic Russians identify as atheist, and nearly 27% identify as unaffiliated.

=== Ethnic policies ===
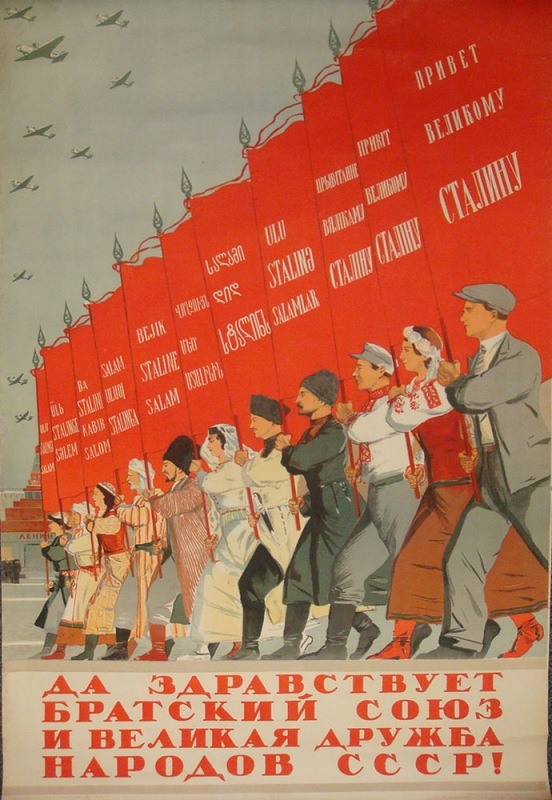
A poster celebrating the unity of the USSR under Stalin. The writing on the flag reads "Greetings to the great Stalin" (in each of the 15 national languages), the text below "Long live the brotherly union and great friendship of the peoples of the USSR!" (in Russian).

The Soviet Union authorities systematically promoted the national consciousness of indigenous peoples and established institutional forms characteristic of a modern nation for them. In Central Asia the liberation of women was approached in the same revolutionary way as the assault on the religion. In 1927 the campaign against paranja (veil) started, called "hujum" (assault). However, it produced a massive backlash and paranja did not disappear until the 1950s.

In 1937, as a part of the Great Purge, repressive “national operations” were conducted. Representatives of “Western” minorities were targeted because of their possible connections to countries hostile to the USSR and fear of disloyalty in case of an invasion.

== Great Purge ==
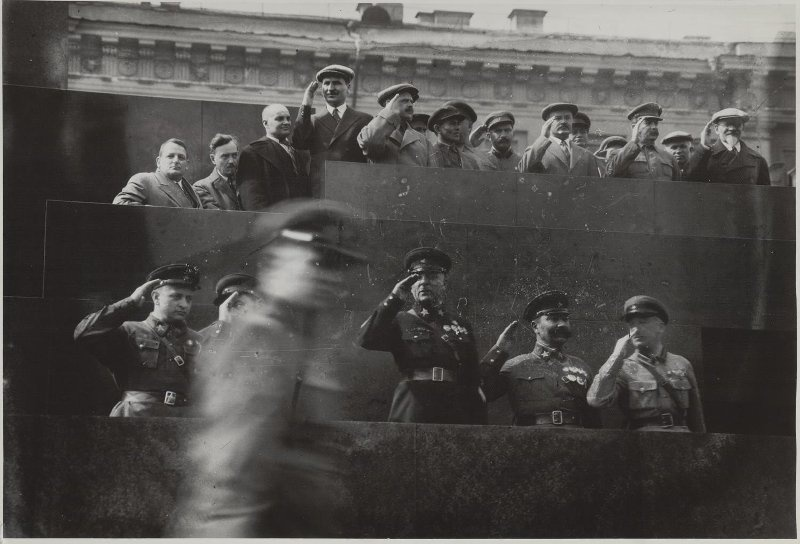
Red Army Soldiers watching a parade on 1 May 1936, at the Beginning of the Great Purge

As this process unfolded, Stalin consolidated near-absolute power by destroying the potential opposition. In 1936–1938, about three quarters of a million Soviets were executed, and more than a million others were sentenced to lengthy terms in harsh labour camps. Stalin's Great Terror ravaged the ranks of factory directors and engineers, and removed most of the senior officers in the Army. The pretext was the 1934 assassination of Sergei Kirov (which many suspect Stalin of having planned, although there is no evidence for this). Nearly all the old pre-1918 Bolsheviks were purged. Trotsky was expelled from the party in 1927, exiled to Kazakhstan in 1928, expelled from the USSR in 1929, and assassinated in 1940. Stalin used the purges to politically and physically destroy his other formal rivals (and former allies) accusing Grigory Zinoviev and Lev Kamenev of being behind Kirov's assassination and planning to overthrow Stalin. Ultimately, the people arrested were tortured and forced to confess to being spies and saboteurs, and quickly convicted and executed.

Several show trials were held in Moscow, to serve as examples for the trials that local courts were expected to carry out elsewhere in the country. There were four key trials from 1936 to 1938, The Trial of the Sixteen was the first (December 1936); then the Trial of the Seventeen (January 1937); then the trial of Red Army generals, including Marshal Mikhail Tukhachevsky (June 1937); and finally the Trial of the Twenty One (including Bukharin) in March 1938. During these, the defendants typically confessed to sabotage, spying, counter-revolution, and conspiring with Germany and Japan to invade and partition the Soviet Union. The initial trials in 1935–1936 were carried out by the OGPU under Genrikh Yagoda. In turn the prosecutors were tried and executed. The secret police were renamed the NKVD and control given to Nikolai Yezhov, known as the "Bloody Dwarf".

The "Great Purge" swept the Soviet Union in 1937. It was widely known as the "Yezhovschina", the "Reign of Yezhov". The rate of arrests was staggering. In the armed forces alone, 34,000 officers were purged, including many at the higher ranks. The entire Politburo and most of the Central Committee were purged, along with foreign communists who were living in the Soviet Union, and numerous intellectuals, bureaucrats, and factory managers. The total of people imprisoned or executed during the Yezhovschina numbered about two million. By 1938, the mass purges were starting to disrupt the country's infrastructure, and Stalin began winding them down. Yezhov was gradually relieved of power. Yezhov was relieved of all powers in 1939, then tried and executed in 1940. His successor as head of the NKVD (from 1938 to 1945) was Lavrentiy Beria, a Georgian friend of Stalin's. Arrests and executions continued into 1952, although nothing on the scale of the Yezhovschina ever happened again.

During this period, the practice of mass arrest, torture, and imprisonment or execution without trial, of anyone suspected by the secret police of opposing Stalin's regime became commonplace. By the NKVD's own count, 681,692 people were shot during 1937–1938 alone, and hundreds of thousands of political prisoners were transported to Gulag work camps. The mass terror and purges were little known to the outside world, and some western intellectuals and fellow travellers continued to believe that the Soviets had created a successful alternative to a capitalist world. In 1936, the country adopted its first formal constitution, which only on paper granted freedom of speech, religion, and assembly. Scholars estimate the total death toll for the Great Purge (1936–1938), including fatalities attributed to prison conditions, to be roughly 700,000-1.2 million.

In March 1939, the 18th congress of the Communist Party was held in Moscow. Most of the delegates present at the 17th congress in 1934 were gone, and Stalin was heavily praised by Litvinov and the western democracies criticized for failing to adopt the principles of "collective security" against Nazi Germany.

=== Interpreting the purges ===
Two major lines of interpretation have emerged among historians. One argues that the purges reflected Stalin's ambitions, his paranoia, and his inner drive to increase his power and eliminate potential rivals. Revisionist historians explain the purges by theorizing that rival factions exploited Stalin's paranoia and used terror to enhance their own position. Peter Whitewood examines the first purge, directed at the Army, and comes up with a third interpretation that: Stalin and other top leaders, assuming that they were always surrounded by enemies, always worried about the vulnerability and loyalty of the Red Army. It was not a ploy – Stalin truly believed it. “Stalin attacked the Red Army because he seriously misperceived a serious security threat”; thus “Stalin seems to have genuinely believed that foreign‐backed enemies had infiltrated the ranks and managed to organize a conspiracy at the very heart of the Red Army.” The purge hit deeply from June 1937 and November 1938, removing 35,000; many were executed. Experience in carrying out the purge facilitated purging other key elements in the wider Soviet polity. Historians often cite the disruption as factors in its disastrous military performance during the German invasion.

== Foreign relations, 1927–1939 ==
Endorsed by the Constitution of the USSR in 1924, the State Emblem of the Soviet Union (above) was a hammer and sickle symbolizing the alliance of the working class and the peasantry. Ears of wheat were entwined in a scarlet band with the inscription in the languages of all the 15 union republics: "Workers of All Countries, Unite!" The grain represented Soviet agriculture. A five-pointed star, symbolizing the Soviet Union's solidarity with socialist revolutionaries on five continents, was drawn on the upper part of the Emblem.

The Soviet government had forfeited foreign-owned private companies during the creation of the RSFSR and the USSR. Foreign investors did not receive any monetary or material compensation. The USSR also refused to pay tsarist-era debts to foreign debtors. The young Soviet polity was a pariah because of its openly stated goal of supporting the overthrow of capitalistic governments. It sponsored workers' revolts to overthrow numerous capitalistic European states, but they all failed. Lenin reversed radical experiments and restored a sort of capitalism with the NEP. The Comintern was ordered to stop organizing revolts. Starting in 1921 Lenin sought trade, loans and recognition. One by one, foreign states reopened trade lines and recognized the Soviet government. The United States was the last major polity to recognise the USSR in 1933. In 1934, the French government proposed an alliance and led 30 governments to invite the USSR to join the League of Nations. The USSR had achieved legitimacy but was expelled in December 1939 for aggression against Finland.

In 1928, Stalin pushed a leftist policy based on his belief in an imminent great crisis for capitalism. Various European communist parties were ordered not to form coalitions and instead to denounce moderate socialists as social fascists. Activists were sent into labour unions to take control away from socialists–a move the British unions never forgave. By 1930, the Stalinists started suggesting the value of alliance with other parties, and by 1934 the idea to form a Popular Front had emerged. Comintern agent Willi Münzenberg was especially effective in organizing intellectuals, antiwar and pacifist elements to join the anti-Nazi coalition. Communists would form coalitions with any party to fight fascism. For Stalinists, the Popular Front was simply an expedient, but to rightists, it represented the desirable form of transition to socialism.

Franco-Soviet relations were initially hostile because the USSR officially opposed the World War I peace settlement of 1919 that France emphatically championed. While the Soviet Union was interested in conquering territories in Eastern Europe, France was determined to protect the fledgling states there. However, Adolf Hitler's foreign policy centered on a massive seizure of Central European, Eastern European, and Russian lands for Germany's own ends, and when Hitler pulled out of the World Disarmament Conference in Geneva in 1933, the threat hit home. Soviet Foreign Minister Maxim Litvinov reversed Soviet policy regarding the Paris Peace Settlement, leading to a Franco-Soviet rapprochement. In May 1935, the USSR concluded pacts of mutual assistance with France and Czechoslovakia. Stalin-ordered the Comintern to form a popular front with leftist and centrist parties against the forces of Fascism. The pact was undermined, however, by strong ideological hostility to the Soviet Union and the Comintern's new front in France, Poland's refusal to permit the Red Army on its soil, France's defensive military strategy, and a continuing Soviet interest in patching up relations with Nazi Germany.

The Soviet Union supplied military aid to the Republican faction of the Second Spanish Republic during the Spanish Civil War, including munitions and soldiers, and helped far-left activists come to Spain as volunteers. The Spanish government let the USSR have the government treasury. Soviet units systematically liquidated anarchist supporters of the Spanish government. Moscow's support of the government gave the Republicans a Communist taint in the eyes of anti-Bolsheviks in Britain and France, weakening the calls for Anglo-French intervention in the war.

Nazi Germany promulgated an Anti-Comintern Pact with Imperialist Japan and Fascist Italy, along with various Central and Eastern European states (such as Hungary), ostensibly to suppress Communist activity but more realistically to forge an alliance against the USSR.

== World War II ==
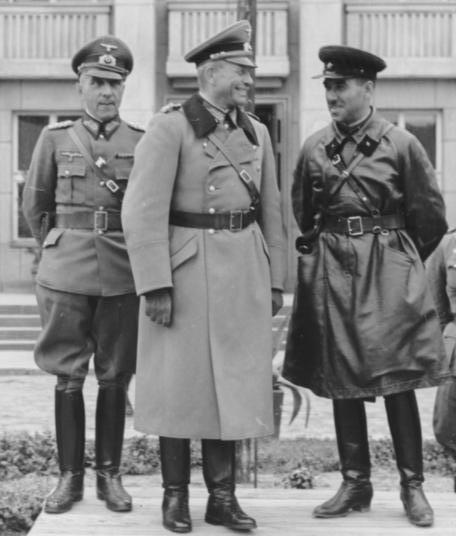
Common parade of Wehrmacht and Red Army in Brest at the end of the Invasion of Poland. At the center Major General Heinz Guderian and Brigadier Semyon Krivoshein

Stalin arranged the Molotov–Ribbentrop Pact, a non-aggression pact with Nazi Germany on 23 August along with the German-Soviet Commercial Agreement to open economic relations. A secret appendix to the pact gave Eastern Poland, Latvia, Estonia, Bessarabia and Finland to the USSR, and Western Poland and Lithuania to Nazi Germany. This reflected the Soviet desire of territorial gains.

Following the pact with Hitler, Stalin in 1939–1940 annexed half of Poland, the three Baltic States, and Northern Bukovina and Bessarabia in Romania. They no longer were buffers separating the USSR from German areas, argues Louis Fischer. Rather they facilitated Hitler's rapid advance to the gates of Moscow.

Propaganda was also considered an important foreign relations tool. International exhibitions, the distribution of media such as films, e.g.: Alexander Nevski, as well as inviting prominent foreign individuals to tour the Soviet Union, were used as a method of gaining international influence and encouraging fellow travelers and pacifists to build popular fronts.

=== Start of World War II ===
Germany invaded Poland on 1 September; the USSR followed on 17 September. The Soviets quelled opposition by executing and arresting thousands. They relocated suspect ethnic groups to Siberia in four waves, 1939–1941. Estimates varying from the figure over 1.5 million.

After Poland was divided up with Germany, Stalin made territorial demands to Finland, claiming security needs regarding the protection of Leningrad. After the Finns refused the demands, the Soviets invaded Finland on 30 November 1939, launching the Winter War, with the goal of annexing Finland into the Soviet Union. Despite outnumbering Finnish troops by over 2.5:1, the war proved embarrassingly difficult for the Red Army, which was ill-equipped for the winter weather and lacking competent commanders since the purge of the Soviet high command. The Finns resisted fiercely, and received some support and considerable sympathy from the Allies. On 29 January 1940, the Soviets put an end to their puppet Terijoki Government that they had intended on inserting into Helsinki, and informed the Finnish government that the Soviet Union was willing to negotiate peace. The Moscow Peace Treaty was signed on 12 March 1940, with the war ending the following day. By the terms of the treaty, Finland relinquished the Karelian Isthmus and some smaller territories. London, Washington—and especially Berlin—calculated that the poor showing of the Soviet army indicated it was incompetent to defend the USSR against a German invasion.

In 1940, the USSR occupied and illegally annexed Lithuania, Latvia, and Estonia. On 14 June 1941, the USSR performed first mass deportations from Lithuania, Latvia, and Estonia.

On 26 June 1940 the Soviet government issued an ultimatum to the Romanian minister in Moscow, demanding the Kingdom of Romania immediately cede Bessarabia and Northern Bukovina. Italy and Germany, which needed a stable Romania and access to its oil fields urged King Carol II to do so. Under duress, with no prospect of aid from France or Britain, Carol complied. On 28 June, Soviet troops crossed the Dniester and occupied Bessarabia, Northern Bukovina, and the Hertsa region.

=== Great Patriotic War ===
Soviet children celebrating the school year end on the eve of the Great Patriotic War, 21 June 1941.

On 22 June 1941, Adolf Hitler abruptly broke the non-aggression pact and invaded the Soviet Union. Stalin had made no preparations. Soviet intelligence was fooled by German disinformation and the invasion caught the Soviet military unprepared. In the larger sense, Stalin expected invasion but not so soon. The Army had been decimated by the Purges; time was needed for a recovery of competence. As such, mobilization did not occur and the Soviet Army was tactically unprepared as of the invasion. The initial weeks of the war were a disaster, with hundreds of thousands of men being killed, wounded, or captured. Whole divisions disintegrated against the German onslaught. Soviet POWs in German prison camps were treated poorly, leading to only 1/10 of Red Army POWs surviving German camps. In contrast, 1/3 of German POWs survived the Soviet prison camps.

German troops reached the outskirts of Moscow in December 1941, but failed to capture it, due to staunch Soviet defence and counterattacks. At the Battle of Stalingrad in 1942–1943, the Red Army inflicted a crushing defeat on the German army. Due to the unwillingness of the Japanese to open a second front in Manchuria, the Soviets were able to call dozens of Red Army divisions back from eastern Russia. These units were instrumental in turning the tide, because most of their officer corps had escaped Stalin's purges. The Soviet forces soon launched massive counterattacks along the entire German line. By 1944, the Germans had been pushed out of the Soviet Union onto the banks of the Vistula river, just east of Prussia. With Soviet Marshal Georgy Zhukov attacking from Prussia, and Marshal Ivan Konev slicing Germany in half from the south, the fate of Nazi Germany was sealed. On 2 May 1945 the last German troops surrendered to the Soviet troops in Berlin.

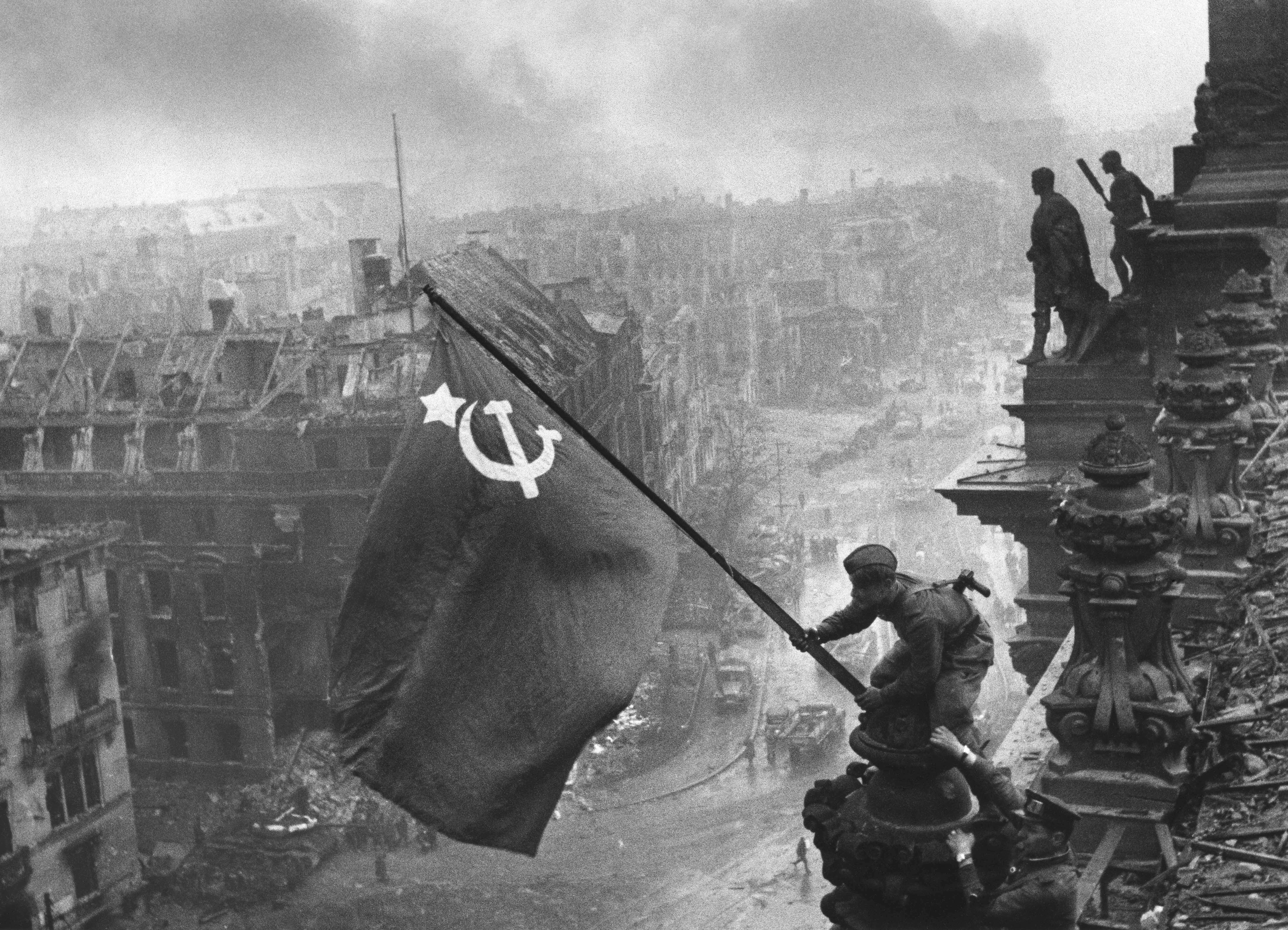
The iconic "Raising a flag over the Reichstag" photo, taken to symbolize the Soviet victory at the Battle of Berlin

=== Wartime developments ===
From the end of 1944 to 1949, large sections of eastern Germany came under the Soviet Union's occupation and on 2 May 1945, the capital city Berlin was taken, while over fifteen million Germans were removed from eastern Germany (renamed the Recovered Territories of the Polish People's Republic) and pushed into central Germany (later called the German Democratic Republic) and western Germany (later called the Federal Republic of Germany).

An atmosphere of patriotic emergency took over the Soviet Union during the war, and persecution of the Orthodox Church was halted. The Church was now permitted to operate with a fair degree of freedom, so long as it did not get involved in politics. In 1944, a new Soviet national anthem was written, replacing the Internationale, which had been used as the national anthem since 1918. These changes were made because it was thought that the people would respond better to a fight for their country than for a political ideology.

State Anthem of the Soviet Union

The Soviets bore the brunt of World War II because the West did not open up a second ground front in Europe until the invasion of Italy and the Battle of Normandy. Approximately 26.6 million Soviets, among them 18 million civilians, were killed in the war. Civilians were rounded up and burned or shot in many cities conquered by the Nazis. The retreating Soviet army was ordered to pursue a 'scorched earth' policy whereby retreating Soviet troops were ordered to destroy civilian infrastructure and food supplies so that the Nazi German troops could not use them.

Stalin's original declaration in March 1946 that there were 7 million war dead was revised in 1956 by Nikita Khrushchev with a round number of 20 million. In the late 1980s, demographers in the State Statistics Committee (Goskomstat) took another look using demographic methods and came up with an estimate of 26–27 million. A variety of other estimates have been made. In most detailed estimates roughly two-thirds of the estimated deaths were civilian losses. However, the breakdown of war losses by nationality is less well known. One study, relying on indirect evidence from the 1959 population census, found that while in terms of the aggregate human losses the major Slavic groups suffered most, the largest losses relative to population size were incurred by minority nationalities mainly from European Russia, among groups from which men were mustered to the front in "nationality battalions" and appear to have suffered disproportionately.

After the war, the Soviet Union occupied and dominated Eastern Europe, in line with Soviet ideology.

Stalin was determined to punish those peoples he saw as collaborating with Germany during the war and to deal with the problem of nationalism, which would tend to pull the Soviet Union apart. Millions of Poles, Latvians, Georgians, Ukrainians and other ethnic minorities were deported to Gulags in Siberia. (Previously, following the 1939 annexation of eastern Poland, thousands of Polish Army officers, including reservists, had been executed in the spring of 1940, in what came to be known as the Katyn massacre.) In addition, in 1941, 1943 and 1944 several whole nationalities had been deported to Siberia, Kazakhstan, and Central Asia, including, among others, the Volga Germans, Chechens, Ingush, Balkars, Crimean Tatars, and Meskhetian Turks. Though these groups were later politically "rehabilitated", some were never given back their former autonomous regions.

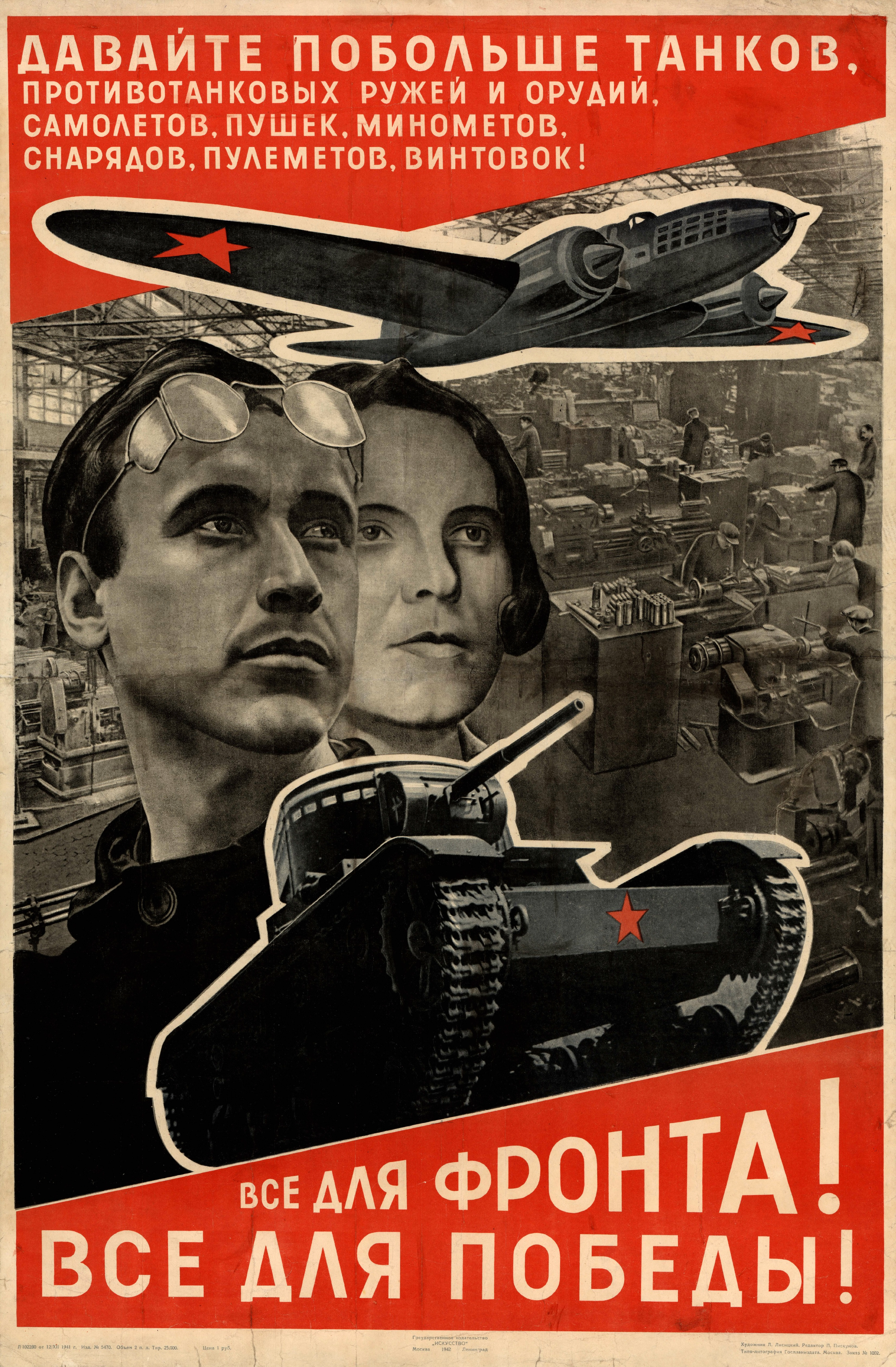
"Everything for the Front. Everything for Victory", Soviet World War 2 propaganda poster

At the same time, in a famous Victory Day toast in May 1945, Stalin extolled the role of the Russian people in the defeat of the fascists.

I would like to raise a toast to the health of our Soviet people and, before all, the Russian people. I drink, before all, to the health of the Russian people, because in this war they earned general recognition as the leading force of the Soviet Union among all the nationalities of our country... And this trust of the Russian people in the Soviet Government was the decisive strength, which secured the historic victory over the enemy of humanity – over fascism...

World War II resulted in enormous destruction of infrastructure and populations throughout Eurasia, from the Atlantic to the Pacific oceans, with almost no country left unscathed. The Soviet Union was especially devastated due to the mass destruction of the industrial base that it had built up in the 1930s. The USSR also experienced a major famine in 1946–1948 due to war devastation that cost an estimated 1 to 1.5 million lives as well as secondary population losses due to reduced fertility. (Note: Although the 1946 drought was severe, government mismanagement of its grain reserves largely accounted for the population losses.) However, the Soviet Union recovered its production capabilities and overcame pre-war capabilities, becoming the country with the most powerful land army in history by the end of the war, and having the most powerful military production capabilities.

==== War and Stalinist industrial-military development ====
Although the Soviet Union received aid and weapons from the United States under the Lend-Lease program, the Soviet production of war materials was greater than that of Nazi Germany because of rapid growth of Soviet industrial production during the interwar years (additional supplies from lend-lease accounted for about 10–12% of the Soviet Union's own industrial output). The Second Five Year Plan raised steel production to 18 million tons and coal to 128 million tons. Before it was interrupted, the Third Five Year Plan produced no less than 19 million tons of steel and 150 million tons of coal.

The Soviet Union's industrial output provided an armaments industry which supported their army, helping it resist the Nazi military offensive. According to Robert L. Hutchings, "One can hardly doubt that if there had been a slower buildup of industry, the attack would have been successful and world history would have evolved quite differently." For the laborers involved in industry, however, life was difficult. Workers were encouraged to fulfill and overachieve quotas through propaganda, such as the Stakhanovite movement.

Some historians, however, interpret the lack of preparedness of the Soviet Union to defend itself as a flaw in Stalin's economic planning. David Shearer, for example, argues that there was "a command-administrative economy" but it was not "a planned one". He argues that the Soviet Union was still suffering from the Great Purge, and was completely unprepared for the German invasion. Economist Holland Hunter, in addition, argues in his Overambitious First Soviet Five-Year Plan, that an array "of alternative paths were available, evolving out of the situation existing at the end of the 1920s... that could have been as good as those achieved by, say, 1936 yet with far less turbulence, waste, destruction and sacrifice."

== Cold War ==
=== Soviet control over Eastern Europe ===
Soviet expansion, change of Central-eastern European borders and creation of the Eastern Bloc after World War II

In the aftermath of World War II, the Soviet Union extended its political and military influence over Eastern Europe, in a move that was seen by some as a continuation of the older policies of the Russian Empire. Some territories that had been lost by Soviet Russia in the Treaty of Brest-Litovsk (1918) were annexed by the Soviet Union after World War II: the Baltic states and eastern portions of interwar Poland. The Russian SFSR also gained the northern half of East Prussia (Kaliningrad Oblast) from Germany. The Ukrainian SSR gained Transcarpathia (as Zakarpattia Oblast) from Czechoslovakia, and Ukrainian populated Northern Bukovina (as Chernivtsi Oblast) from Romania. Finally, by the late 1940s, pro-Soviet Communist Parties won the elections in five countries of Central and Eastern Europe (specifically Poland, Czechoslovakia, Hungary, Romania and Bulgaria) and subsequently became People's Democracies. These elections are generally regarded as rigged, and the Western powers recognized them as show elections. For the duration of the Cold War, the countries of Eastern Europe became Soviet satellite states — they were "independent" nations, which were one-party communist states whose General Secretary had to be approved by the Kremlin, and so their governments usually kept their policy in line with the wishes of the Soviet Union, although nationalistic forces and pressures within the satellite states played a part in causing some deviation from strict Soviet rule.

=== Tenor of Soviet–U.S. relations ===
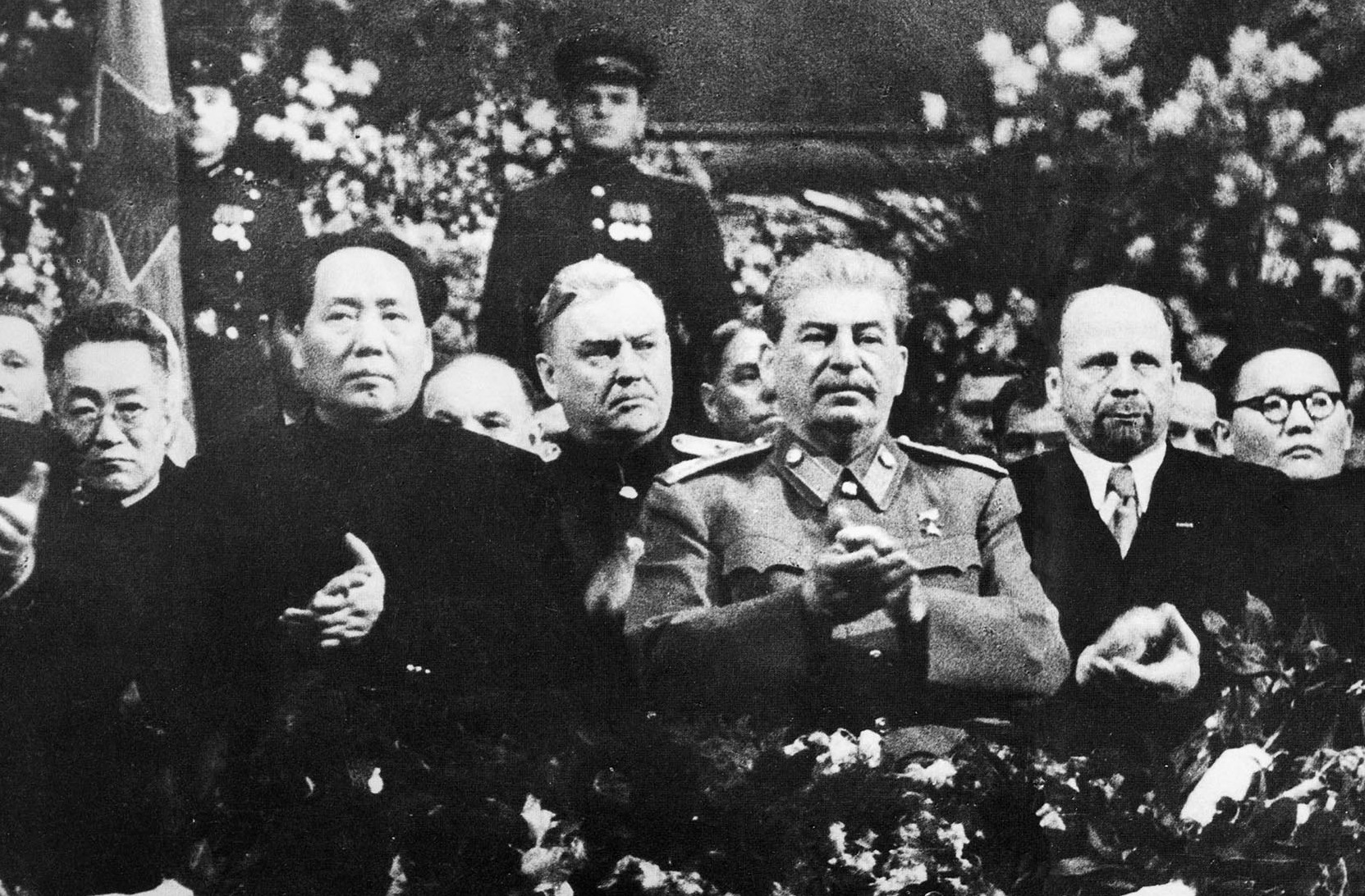
Stalin, during his 70th Birthday Celebration, with Mao Zedong, Nikolai Bulganin, and Walter Ulbricht

The USSR urgently needed munitions, food and fuel that was provided by the U.S. and also Britain, primarily through Lend Lease. The three powers kept in regular contact, with Stalin trying to maintain a veil of secrecy over internal affairs. Churchill and other top Soviets visited Moscow, as did Roosevelt's top aide Harry Hopkins. Stalin repeatedly requested that the United States and Britain open a second front on Continental Europe; but the Allied invasion did not occur until June 1944, more than two years later. In the meantime, the Russians suffered high casualties, and the Soviets faced the brunt of German strength. The Allies pointed out that their intensive air bombardment was a major factor that Stalin ignored.

=== Korean War ===
In 1950, the Soviet Union protested against the fact that the Chinese seat at the United Nations Security Council was held by the Nationalist government of China, and boycotted the meetings. While the Soviet Union was absent, the UN passed a resolution condemning North Korean actions and eventually offered military support to South Korea. After this incident the Soviet Union was never absent at the meetings of the Security Council.

== Domestic events ==
=== Censorship ===
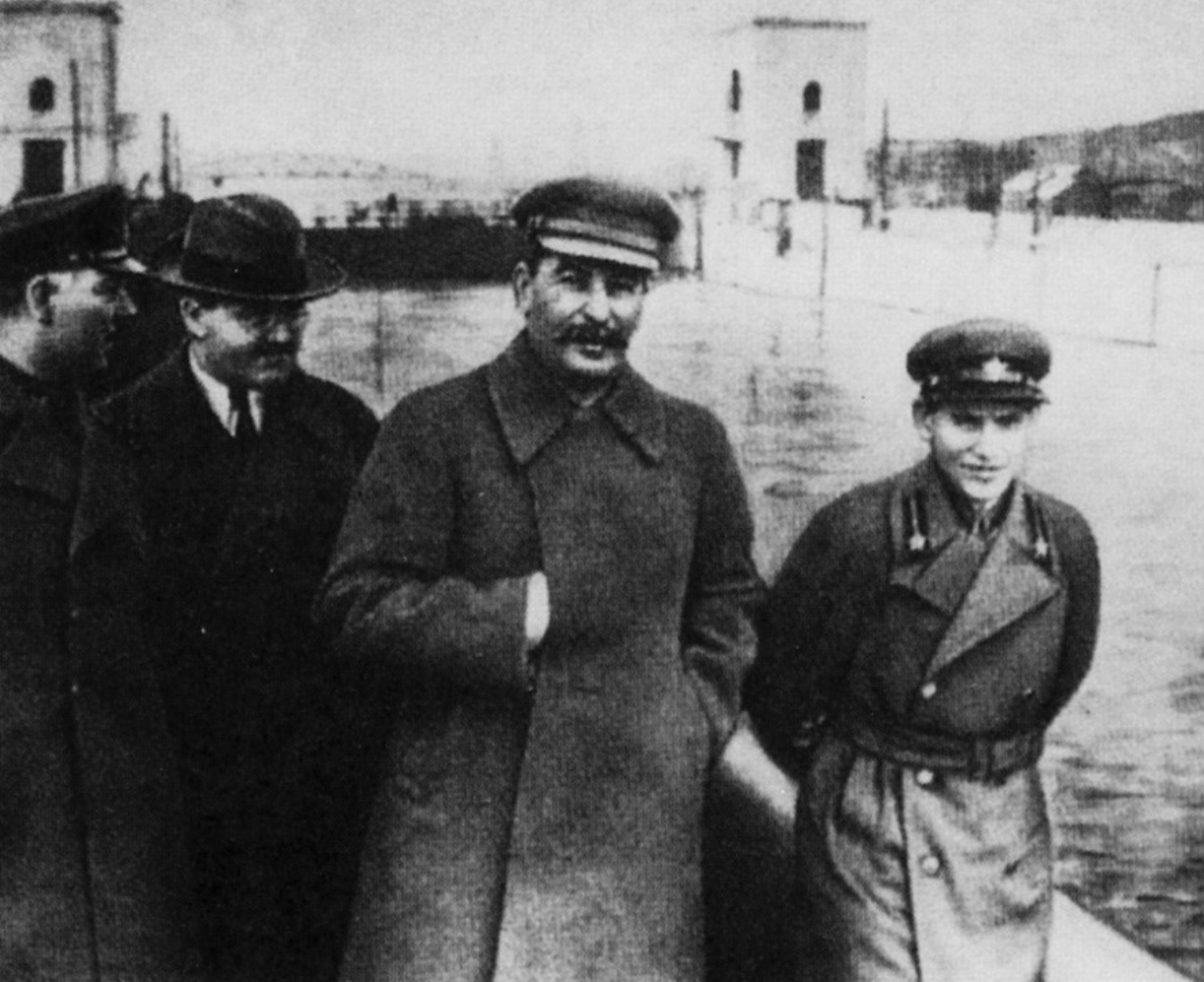
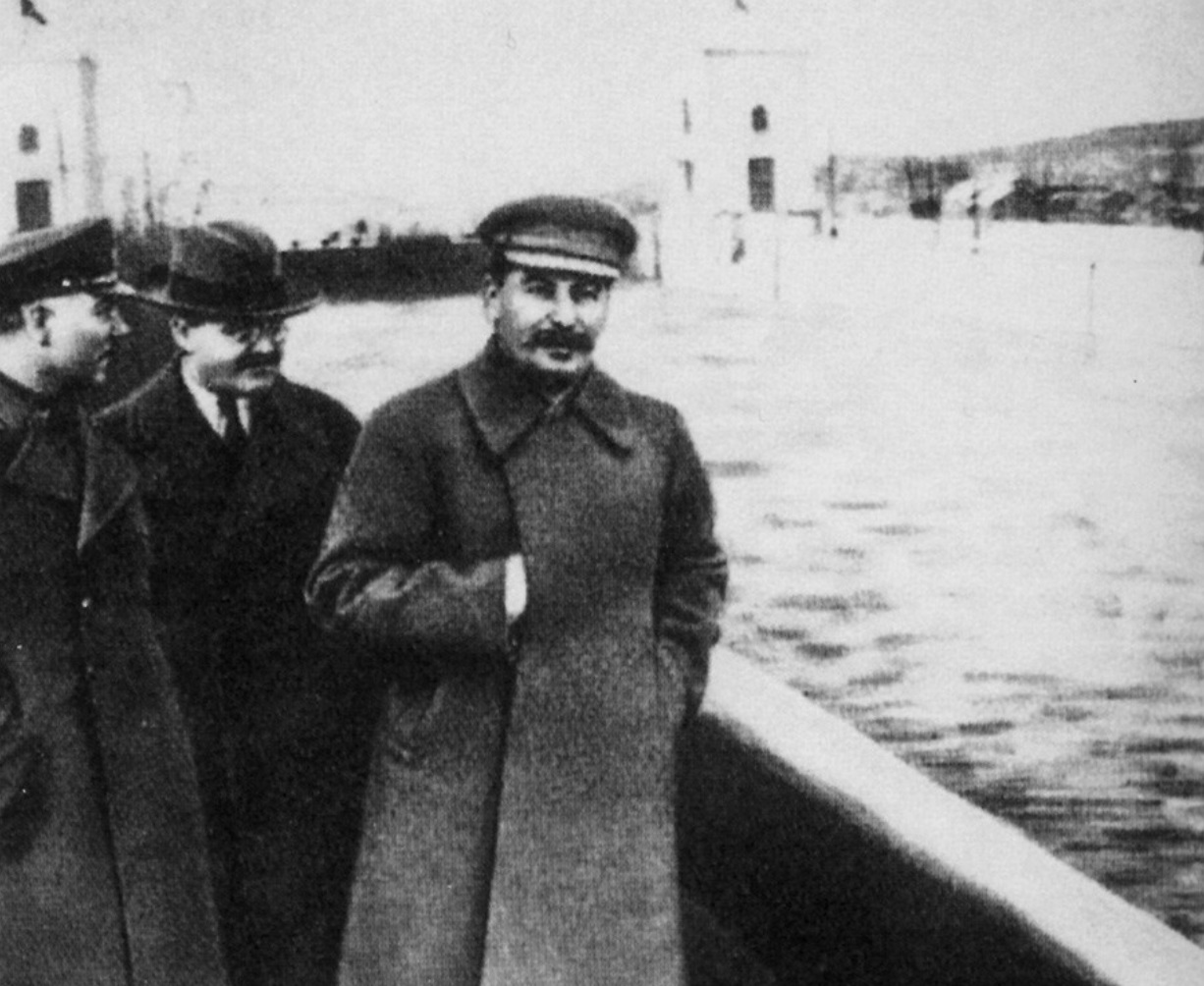
Nikolai Yezhov was removed from photographs in the Soviet Union following the Great Purge by Joseph Stalin (center)

Art and science were subjected to rigorous censorship under Stalin's direct oversight. Where previously The All- Russian Union of Writers (AUW) had attempted to publish apolitical writing, The Russian Association of Proletarian Writers (RAPP) insisted on the importance of politics in literary work, and published content which primarily embodied the hegemony of the working-class values in fiction. In 1925, The RAPP launched a campaign against the AUW chairman Yevgeny Zamyatin. It resulted in the defeat of the AUW, and they were replaced by the All-Russian Union of Soviet Writers, which strictly adopted the literary style of socialist realism. Soviet biology studies were heavily influenced by the now-discredited biologist Trofim Lysenko, who rejected the concept of Mendelian inheritance in favor of a form of Lamarckism. In physics, the theory of relativity was dismissed as "bourgeois idealism". Much of this censorship was the work of Andrei Zhdanov, known as Stalin's "ideological hatchet man", until his death from a heart attack in 1948.

Stalin's cult of personality reached its height in the postwar period, with his picture displayed in every school, factory, and government office, yet he rarely appeared in public. Postwar reconstruction proceeded rapidly, but as the emphasis was all on heavy industry and energy, living standards remained low, especially outside of the major cities.

=== Post-war period ===
The mild political liberalization that took place in the Soviet Union during the war quickly came to an end in 1945. The Orthodox Church was generally left unmolested after the war and was even allowed to print small amounts of religious literature, but persecution of minority religions was resumed.

Stalin and the Communist Party were given full credit for the victory over Germany, and generals such as Zhukov were demoted to regional commands (Ukraine in his case). With the onset of the Cold War, anti-Western propaganda was stepped up, with the capitalist world depicted as a decadent place where crime, unemployment, and poverty were rampant.

The late Stalinist period saw the emergence of a tacit "big deal" between the state and the Soviet nomenklatura and the experts whose status corresponded to that of the Western middle class under which the state would accept "bourgeois" habits such as a degree of consumerism, romance, and domesticity in exchange for the unflinching loyalty of the nomenklatura to the state. The informal "big deal" was a result of World War II as many of the Soviet middle classes expected a higher standard of living after the war in exchange for accepting wartime sacrifices, and as the Soviet system could not function without the necessary technical experts and the nomenklatura, the state needed the services of such people, leading to the informal "big deal". Furthermore, during the war, the state had to a certain extent relaxed its control and allowed informal practices to exist that usually contravened the rules. After 1945, this loosening of social control was never completely undone as instead the state sought to co-opt the certain elements of the population, allowing certain rules to be contravened provided that the populace remained overall loyal. One result of the "big deal" was a rise in materialism, corruption and nepotism that continued to color daily life in the Soviet Union for the rest of its existence. Another example of the "big deal" was the publication starting in the late 1940s of a series of romance novels aimed at a female audience; a choice of subject matter that would have been unthinkable before the war.

In particular, the late 1940s saw the rise of the vory v zakone ("thieves in law") as Russian organised crime is known who form a very distinctive subculture complete with their own dialect of Russian. Despite their name, the vory v zakone are not just thieves, but engage in the entire gamut of criminal activities. The vory v zakone did well as blackmarketers in a post-war society that suffered from a shortage of basic goods. The crime wave that gripped the Soviet Union in the late 1940s was the source of much public disquiet at the time. A particular source of worry was the rise of juvenile crime with one police study from 1947 showing that 69% of all crimes were committed by teenagers under the age of 16. Most of the juvenile criminals were orphans from the war living on the streets who turned to crime as the only way to survive. Most of the complaints about juvenile crime concerned street children working as prostitutes, thieves or hiring their services out to the vory v zakone. Various economic reforms like Monetary reform of 1947 were undertaken in order to stabilize post-war economy and suppress illegal trade.

The Great Patriotic War despite the immense sufferings and losses, thanks to propaganda, came to be looked backed nostalgically as a time of excitement, adventure, danger, and national solidarity while life in the post-war era was seen as dull, stagnant, mundane and as a time when people put their own individual interests ahead of the greater good. There was a widespread feeling that though the war had been won, the peace had been lost as the wartime expectations and hopes for a better world after the war were dashed. The post-war era saw the emergences of various subcultures that usually in some way deviated from what was officially ascribed (for an example listening to smuggled records of Western pop music), and depending upon the nature of the subcultures were either tolerated by the authorities or cracked down upon. Another post-war social trend was the emergence of greater individualism and a search for privacy as the demand grew for private apartments while those in urban areas sought to spend more time in the countryside, where the state had less control over daily life. For members of the nomenklatura, the ultimate status symbol came to be the dacha in the countryside where the nomenklatura and their families could enjoy themselves far from prying eyes. Others sought their own personal space by devoting themselves to apolitical pursuits such as the hard sciences or by moving to a remote region such as Siberia where the state had less control. Informal networks of friends and relatives known as svoi ("one's own") emerged that functioned as self-help societies, and often became crucial to determining one's social success as the membership of the right svoi could improve the odds of one's children attending a prestigious university or allow one to obtain basic goods in short supply such as toilet paper. Another example of the social trend towards a greater personal spaces for ordinary people was the rise in popularity of underground poetry and of the samizdat literature that criticized the Soviet system.

Despite the best efforts of the authorities, many young people in the late 1940s liked to listen to the Russian language broadcasts of the Voice of America and the British Broadcasting Corporation (BBC), leading to a major campaign launched in 1948 intended to discredit both radio stations as "capitalist propaganda". Likewise, the journals Amerika (America) and Britanskii Soiuznik (British Ally) published by the American and British governments were very popular with young people in the late 1940s, selling out within minutes of appearing on kiosks in Moscow and Leningrad (modern St. Petersburg). The German historian Juliane Fürst has cautioned the interest of young people in the Anglo-American culture was not necessarily a rejection of the Soviet system, but instead reflected mere curiosity about the world beyond the Soviet Union. Fürst wrote that many young people in the late 1940s-early 1950s displayed ambivalent attitudes, being on one hand convinced that their nation was the world's greatest and most progressive nation while at the same time displaying a certain nagging self-doubt and a belief that just might be something better out there. The way that Russian nationalism had merged with Communism during the Great Patriotic War to create a new Soviet identity based equally upon pride in being Russian and being Communist allowed the authorities to cast criticism of the Soviet system as "unpatriotic", which for the time seemed to rebuff the elements of self-doubt that were residing with certain segments of the people.

Another sign of a growing search for a personal space of one's own after 1945 were the popularity of apolitical films such as musicals, comedies and romances over the more political films that glorified Communism. The late 1940s were a time of what the Hungarian historian Peter Kenz called the "film hunger" as the Soviet film industry could not release enough films owing to the problems posed by post war reconstruction, and so as a result Soviet cinemas showed American and German films captured by the Red Army in the eastern parts of Germany and in Eastern Europe, known in the Soviet Union as "trophy films". Much to the worry of the authorities, American films such as Stagecoach, The Roaring Twenties, The Count of Monte Cristo, and Sun Valley proved to be extremely popular with Soviet audiences. The most popular of all the foreign films were the 1941 German-Hungarian romantic musical film The Girl of My Dreams, which was released in the Soviet Union in 1947, and the 1941 American film Tarzan's New York Adventures, which was released in the Soviet Union in 1951. The musician Bulat Okudzhava recalled: "It was the one and only thing in Tbilisi for which everyone went out of their minds, the trophy film, The Girl of My Dreams, with the extraordinary and indescribable Marika Rökk in the main role. Normal life stopped in the city. Everyone talked about the film, they ran to see it whenever they had a chance, in the streets people whistled melodies from it, from half-open windows you hear people playing tunes from it on the piano".

As early as the late 1940s, the Austrian scholar Franz Borkenau contended that the Soviet government was not a monolithic totalitarian machine, but instead divided into vast chefstvo (patronage) networks extending down from the elite to the lowest ranks of power with Stalin more as the ultimate arbiter of the various factions instead of being the leader of a 1984 type state. Borkenau's techniques were a minute analysis of official Soviet statements and the relative placement of various officials at the Kremlin on festive occasions to determine which Soviet official enjoyed Stalin's favour and which official did not. Signs such as newspaper editorials, guest lists at formal occasions, obituaries in Soviet newspapers, and accounts of formal speeches were important to identifying the various chefstvo networks. Borkenau argued that even small changes in the formalistic language of the Soviet state could sometimes indicate important changes: "Political issues must be interpreted in the light of formulas, political and otherwise, and their history; and such interpretation cannot be safely concluded until the whole history of the given formula has been established from its first enunciation on".

Terror by the secret police continued in the postwar period. Although nothing comparable to 1937 ever happened again, there were many smaller purges, including a mass purge of the Georgian Communist Party apparatus in 1951–52. Starting in 1949, the principle enemy of the state came to be portrayed as the "rootless cosmopolitans", a term that was never precisely defined. The term "rootless cosmopolitan" in practice was used to attack intellectuals, Jews and frequently both. Stalin's health also deteriorated precipitously after WWII. He suffered a stroke in the fall of 1945 and was ill for months. This was followed by another stroke in 1947. Stalin became less active in the day-to-day running of the state and instead of party meetings, preferred to invite the Politburo members to all-night dinners where he would watch movies and force them to get drunk and embarrass themselves or say something incriminating.

In October 1952, the first postwar party congress convened in Moscow. Stalin did not feel up to delivering the main report and for most of the proceedings sat in silence while Nikita Khrushchev and Georgy Malenkov delivered the main speeches. He did suggest however that the party be renamed from "The All-Union Party of Bolsheviks" to "The Communist Party of the Soviet Union" on the grounds that "There was once a time when it was necessary to distinguish ourselves from the Mensheviks, but there are no Mensheviks anymore. We are the entire party now." Stalin also mentioned his advancing age (two months away from 73) and suggested that it might be time to retire. Predictably, no one at the congress would dare agree with it and the delegates instead pleaded for him to stay.

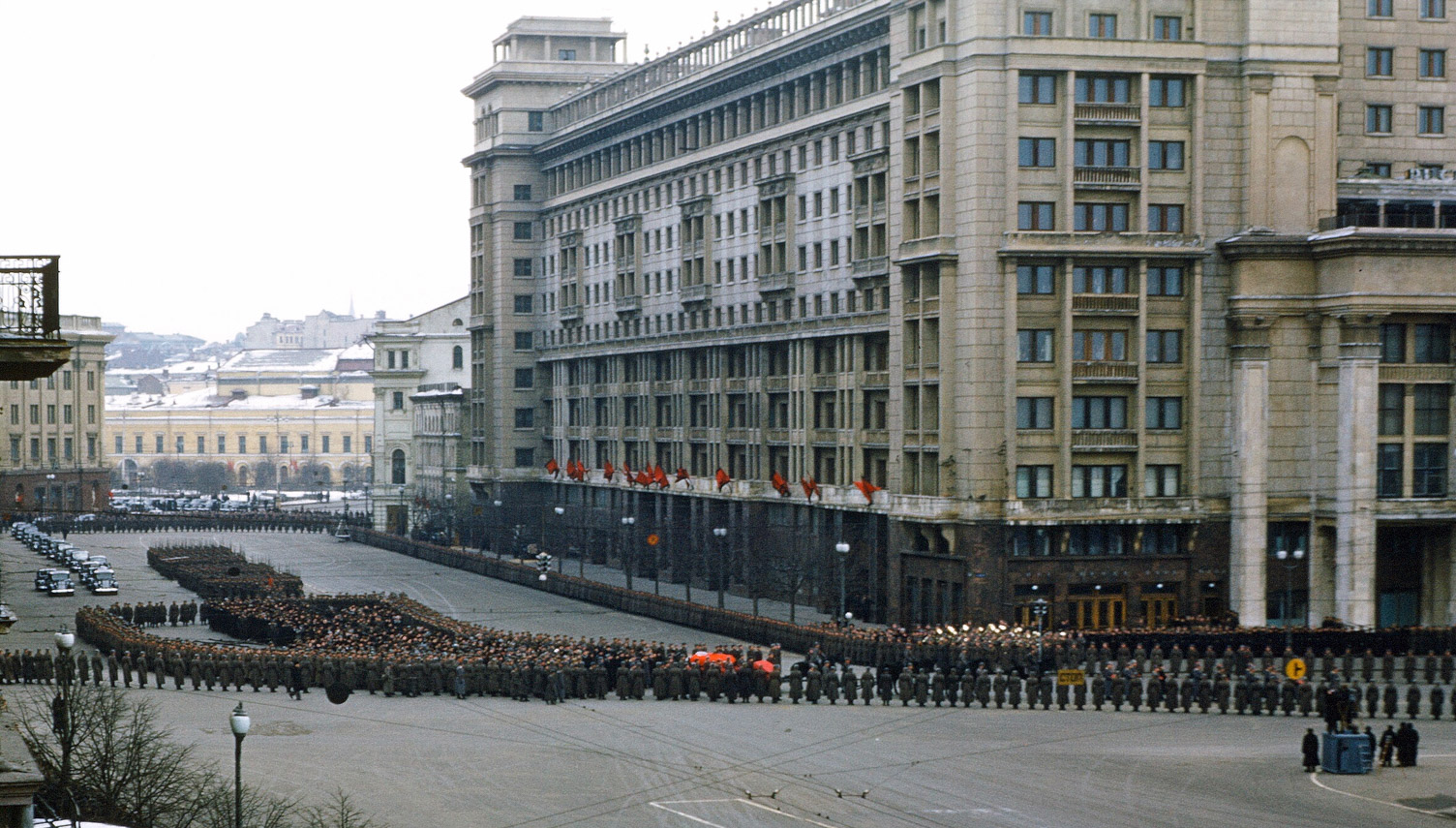
Stalin's funeral procession in 1953

=== Post Stalin's death ===
On 1 March 1953, Stalin's staff found him semi-conscious on the bedroom floor of his Volynskoe dacha. He had suffered a cerebral hemorrhage. Stalin died on 5 March 1953. An autopsy revealed that he had died of a cerebral hemorrhage and that he also suffered from severe damage to his cerebral arteries due to atherosclerosis. It is possible that Stalin was murdered. Beria has been suspected of murder, although no firm evidence has ever appeared.

Stalin left no anointed successor nor a framework within which a transfer of power could take place. The Central Committee met on the day of his death, with Malenkov, Beria, and Khrushchev emerging as the party's key figures. The system of collective leadership was restored, and measures introduced to prevent any one member attaining autocratic domination again. The collective leadership included the following eight senior members of the Presidium of the Central Committee of the Communist Party of the Soviet Union listed according to the order of precedence presented formally on 5 March 1953: Georgy Malenkov, Lavrentiy Beria, Vyacheslav Molotov, Kliment Voroshilov, Nikita Khrushchev, Nikolai Bulganin, Lazar Kaganovich and Anastas Mikoyan. Reforms to the Soviet system were immediately implemented. Economic reform scaled back the mass construction projects, placed a new emphasis on house building, and eased the levels of taxation on the peasantry to stimulate production. The new leaders sought rapprochement with the Socialist Federal Republic of Yugoslavia and a less hostile relationship with the United States, pursuing a negotiated end to the Korean War in July 1953. The doctors who had been imprisoned were released and the anti-Semitic purges ceased. A mass amnesty of 1953 for certain categories of imprisoned was issued, halving the country's inmate population, while the state security and Gulag systems were reformed, with torture being banned in April 1953.
