= Babi Yar in poetry =

Poems about the 1941 Nazi massacre in Ukraine

Poems about Babi Yar commemorate the massacres committed by the German Einsatzgruppen during World War II at Babi Yar, in a ravine located within the present-day Ukrainian capital of Kyiv. In just one of these atrocities – taking place over September 29–30, 1941 – 33,771 Jewish men, women and children were killed in a single Einsatzgruppen operation.

== Background ==
On June 22, 1941, Nazi Germany attacked the Soviet Union in Operation Barbarossa. The German army crossed the 1939 former Polish-Soviet border soon thereafter and arrived in Kiev on September 19, 1941. Ten days later, following an explosion at the German army headquarters, Jews were rounded up, marched out of town, made to strip naked and massacred; they were stacked up, layer upon layer, at Babi Yar (literally, a "grandmother's ravine.")

For decades after World War II, Soviet authorities were unwilling to acknowledge that the mass murder of Jews at Babi Yar was part of the Holocaust. The victims were generalized as Soviet; mention of their Jewish identity was impermissible, even though their deaths were every bit as much a consequence of the Nazi's genocidal Final Solution as the death camps of occupied Poland (Ehrenburg, Pravda 1944). In order to make the connection the Soviets worked so hard to suppress, Holocaust scholars have come to call events such as the massacres at Babi Yar "the Holocaust by bullet."

By November 1941, the number of Jews shot dead at Babi Yar exceeded 75,000, according to an official report written by SS commander Paul Blobel. But Babi Yar remained the site of mass executions for two more years after the murder of most of Kiev's Jewish community in the fall of 1941. Later victims included prisoners of war, Soviet partisans, Ukrainian nationalists and Gypsies. Over 100,000 more people died there. The deaths of these non-Jewish victims facilitated the Soviet Union's postwar efforts to suppress recognition of Babi Yar's place in the history of the Holocaust, especially in the aftermath of the 1952 executions of prominent Jewish intellectuals dubbed the "Night of the Murdered Poets."

== Authors ==
The atrocity was first remembered by the Jews of Kiev through a manuscript poem by Ilya Selvinsky, called I Saw It!. Even though it wasn't written specifically about Babi Yar, it was broadly received as such. Poems by Holovanivskyi, Ozerov, Ilya Ehrenburg and Pavel Antokolsky (Death Camp) soon followed, but the Jewish identity of the victims was revealed only through "coded" references.

Lyudmila Titova

Possibly the first known poem on the subject was written in Russian the same year the massacres took place, by Liudmila Titova, a young Jewish-Ukrainian poet from Kiev and an eyewitness to the events. Her poem, Babi Yar, was discovered only in the 1990s.

Mykola Bazhan

Mykola Bazhan wrote a poem called Babi Yar in 1943, explicitly depicting the massacres in the ravine. Bazhan was nominated for the 1970 Nobel Prize in Literature. The Communist Party forced him to decline the nomination.

Yevgeny Yevtushenko

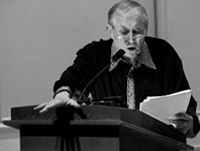
Yevgeny Yevtushenko's Babi Yar broke the long official silence about the connection between Babi Yar and the Holocaust.

In 1961, Yevgeny Yevtushenko published his poem Babi Yar in a leading Russian periodical, in part to protest the Soviet Union's refusal to recognize Babi Yar as a Holocaust site. The poem's first line is "Nad Babim Yarom pamyatnikov nyet" ("There are no monuments over Babi Yar"). The anniversary of the massacre had been observed in the context of the "Great Patriotic War" throughout the 1950s and 60s; the code of silence about what it meant for the Jews was broken only in 1961, with the publication of Yevtushenko's Babi Yar, in Literaturnaya Gazeta. The poet denounced both Soviet historical revisionism and still-common anti-Semitism in the Soviet Union of 1961. "[I]t spoke not only of the Nazi atrocities, but also of the Soviet government's own persecution of Jewish people." Babi Yar first circulated as samizdat (unofficial publications without state sanction). After its publication in Literaturnaya Gazeta, Dmitri Shostakovich set it to music, as the first movement of his Thirteenth Symphony, subtitled Babi Yar.

Moysey Fishbeyn

An important Babi Yar poem was written by Moysey Fishbein in Ukrainian in 1974. It was translated into English by Roman Turovsky.

Ilya Ehrenburg

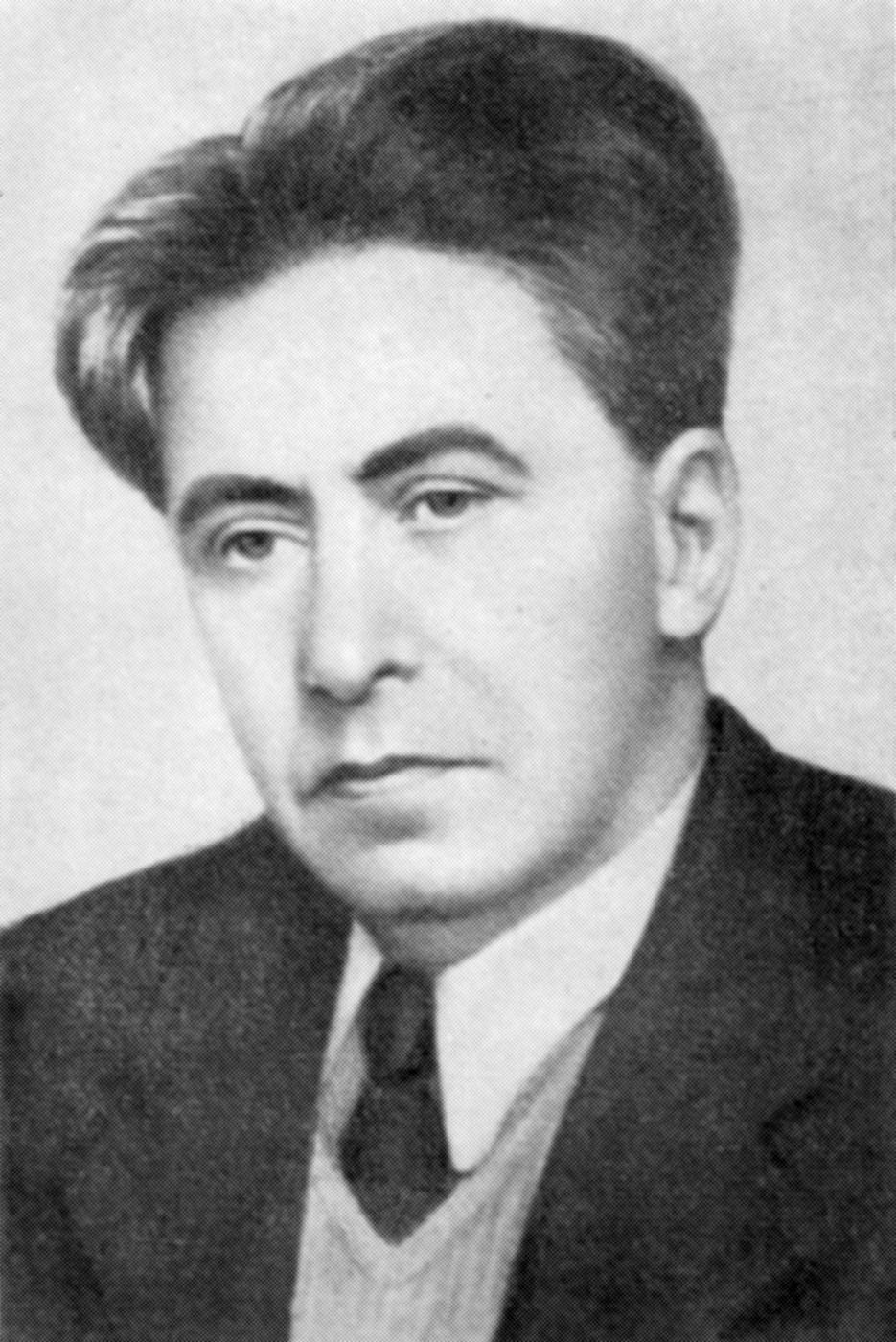
Ilya Ehrenburg (born in Kiev) was 50 at the time of the massacre, living in Moscow

Ehrenburg penned six poems about the Holocaust that first appeared without titles (identified only by numbers) in 1945-46. They were published in three magazines based in Moscow: Novy Mir (New World), Znamya (The Banner) and Oktyabr' (October) (Russian: Октябрь). In one, he wrote of the "grandmother's ravine" through the repetitive use of words: Now, every ravine is my utterance, / And every ravine is my home. The actual title of the poem, Babi Yar, was restored only in a 1959 collection of his work.

=== Other authors ===
In 1943, Sava Holovanivskyi wrote Avraam (Abraham) about Babi Yar, and Kievan poet Olga Anstei wrote Kirillovskie iary (Kirillov Ravines, another name for Babi Yar.) She and her husband, poet Ivan Elagin, defected from the Soviet Union to the West that year.

Undated poems about Babi Yar were written by Leonid Pervomayskiy, In Babi Yar, and Leonid Vysheslavsky, Cross of Olena Teliha. In 1944, Ilya Ehrenburg wrote his Babi Yar, reprinted in 1959, and in 1946 Lev Ozerov wrote and published his long poem Babi Yar.

Lev Ozerov's long poem titled Babi Yar first appeared in Oktyabr' magazine's March–April 1946 issue. Again, many references were "coded": The Fascists and the policemen / Stand at each house, at every fence. / Forget about turning back. Their identities are abstracted even at the pits: A Fascist struck mulishly with the shovel / The soil turned wet... The shovel-wielding assailants are not identified.

Any further publications about the subject were prohibited, along with the Black Book project of 1947 by Ehrenburg and Vasily Grossman, as part of the official Soviet rootless cosmopolitan campaign.

A song, "Babi Yar", was created by Natella Boltyanskaya.

In 2017, Marianna Kiyanovska published a poetry book titled The Voices of Babyn Yar, for which she was awarded the Shevchenko National Prize in 2020. In the poems, she lent her voice to the Jewish victims of the Babi Yar massacre.

== See also ==
- Babi Yar memorials#Literature, film, and music
- The Holocaust in the arts and popular culture
