= Yelagin =

Yelagin or Elagin may refer to:

- Yelagin (surname)
- Yelagin Island
- Yelagin Palace
