= Vera Aleksandrova =

Russian literary critic, historian, and editor (1895–1966)

Vera Aleksandrova (Russian: Вера Александрова; 1895–1966) was a Russian literary critic, historian, and editor. She became a Menshevik before going into exile in Germany. She contributed to Social Democratic publications and moved to Paris in 1933. Following the Nazi invasion of France, she moved to the United States in 1940. She was an editor for the Chekhov Publishing House.

== Early life in Russia ==
Vera Aleksandrovna Mordvinova was born in Russia in 1895. She studied in Moscow and Odessa. She married Solomon Meerovich Shvarts, a Menshevik activist, in 1919. She became Menshevik herself and in 1921 went into exile in Germany with her husband.

== Life in exile ==
Aleksandrova contributed to Austrian and German Social Democratic publications, including Sotsialisticheski vestnik (Socialist Herald), until 1933. With the rise of Nazism in Germany, she and her husband went to Paris in 1933. After the Nazi invasion of France in June 1940, the pair went to New York. Aleksandrova was a contributor to the journals Novyi zhurnal and Novoe russkoe slovo. She wrote for the magazine Amerika from 1946 to 1948.

Aleksandrova contributed to a human behavior research project at Columbia University led by cultural anthropologist Margaret Mead. She served as editor-in-chief for the New York-based Chekhov Publishing House from 1951 to 1956. She published a series of memoirs of Russian emigrants with funds allocated by the Ford Foundation. She also worked on English-language editions of volumes concerning the history of Soviet literature.

Aleksandrova dedicated a chapter to poet Sergei Yesenin in her English-language book, A History of Soviet Literature, 1917–1964: From Gorky to Solzhenitsyn She referred to the poet's work in reviews and articles, and responded to the publication of new works about Yesenin.

Aleksandrova died in 1966.
