= Nikolai Morshen =

Russian poet

- Николай Моршен
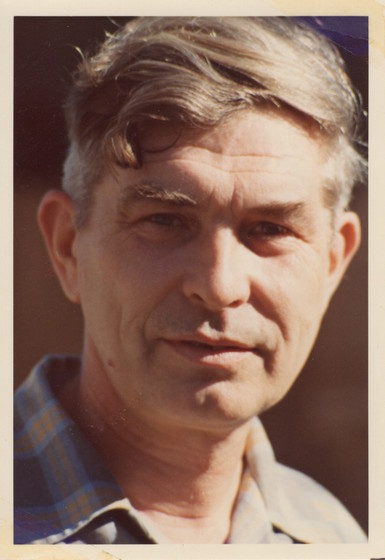
- Nikolai Morshen in 1973. Monterey, CA
- Born: Nikolai Nikolaevich Marchenko; 8 November 1917; Birzula, Kherson Governorate, Russian Republic (now Podilsk, Odesa Oblast, Southern Ukraine)
- Died: 31 July 2001 (aged 83); Monterey, California, US
- Occupations: Poet; translator; lecturer

Nikolai Morshen (November 8, 1917 – July 31, 2001; Russian: Никола́й Мо́ршен, IPA: [nʲɪkɐˈlaj ˈmorʂən], real name Nikolai Nikolaevich Marchenko) was a Russian second-wave émigré poet and a translator of American poetry into Russian born in Southern Ukraine. He was the son of Russian émigré writer Nikolai Narokov (1887–1969), the former member of the White movement.

== Life ==
Nikolai Marchenko was born in Birzula and graduated from secondary school in Odessa, but he always considered Kiev to be his hometown. In 1935–1941, the poet studied at the Taras Shevchenko State University of Kiev, which he graduated with a degree in physics, specializing in metals analysis by X-ray fluorescence. During the Nazi occupation in 1941–1943 he lived in Kiev. In the autumn of 1943, as the Red Army was approaching the city, he left with his father and family with the retreating German troops. Although his parents and he and his wife left voluntarily for Germany, fearing persecution by the Soviet authorities for allegedly collaborating with the German occupiers, none of them were Nazi collaborators. In reality, Morschen's father created a kind of conservatory with two students (his son with his wife) and one teacher, who was also the director – Nikolai Narokov himself. All the "collaboration" came down to the fact that the Germans, striving to create the appearance of a peaceful life being established in Ukraine, allowed the opening of this institution, exempting the students from being sent to forced labor in Germany. And when the reservation was abolished, Morshen and his wife took jobs as laborers in a military factory. Once again, they avoided being sent to the Germans. In 1944 (according to other sources, at the end of 1943), he and his family arrived in Germany, first in Königsberg, then in Berlin, and from 1945 in the Zoo Camp (British Zone of Occupation, Hamburg), where he took the name Morshen, which later became a pseudonym, to avoid repatriation. In 1950, the Marchenko family moved to the United States, first to Baltimore, then to Syracuse, New York, where Morshen found a place of Russian lecture, and finally – to Monterey, California; in the same 1950, the poet took the same position at the Defense Language Institute Foreign Language Center, where he worked until his retirement in 1977.

== Work and critical reception ==
In Germany, since 1946 Morshen began to publish – mainly in the magazine Grani (publishing house Posev of the National Alliance of Russian Solidarists), although he started to write poetry in his homeland. His first publication in Grani (1948) attracted the favorable attention of such an authority on Russian poetry as Georgy Ivanov: "The defects of Nik. Morshen’s poems are accidental and easily remedied, while the merits are very considerable. But for some reason the critics who shower praise on his more successful companions, especially Elagin, have not, if I am not mistaken, once mentioned the name of Nik. Morshen, who is no less deserving of attention than they."

Simon Karlinsky, the professor at the UC Berkeley, has written about Morshen more than anyone else in Western literary studies; see, e.g., his assessments of the poet's work:

Gradually maturing in a leisurely and deliberate manner over almost four decades, this poet’s work, when viewed in its totality, is a study in ever deepening philosophical thought and ever more finely honed verbal master.

One seemingly paradoxical aspect of Morshen’s poetry is its combination of extremely modern themes and thought with traditionalist external form. His poetry up to and including Punctuation: Colon is all couched in traditional Russian syllabotonic meters and exact, nineteenth-century-type rhymes. In this respect, Morshen is comparable to two modern American poets, Robert Frost and Richard Wilbur (his inner correspondences with and similarities to the latter extend beyond matters of poetic technique, and it is only fitting that Morshen and Wilbur have translated each other's poetry.

Morshen's frequent insistence that the arts and sciences are ultimately children of nature in exactly the same sense as living beings are (including the germinating plants that are the dominant image of Dvoetochie and the talented birds whose song keynoted Ekho i zerkalo). So is the inorganic matter that forms the earth and its atmosphere.

The German Slavist and translator Wolfgang Kasack in his Dictionary of Russian literature from 1917 gives the following assessment of Morshen's poetry:

The paradoxical and ironic nature of the message reveals the distance to world events and conceals the author’s own attitude. It forces the reader to think further. Occasionally highly unusual rhymes lend Morshen’s poetry a special charm.

For the Russian-language magazine Amerika, Morshen translated a lot from American poets, such as Oliver Wendell Holmes Sr., Henry Wadsworth Longfellow, James Russell Lowell, Francis Hopkinson, Henry David Thoreau, Walt Whitman, Emily Dickinson, Robert Frost, and many others. As a large selection, Morshen's translations from American poetry were first published in the book Pushche nevoli (2000), prepared by Prof. Vladimir Agenosov.

== Poetry collections ==
- Моршен, Николай (1959). Тюлень: стихи ('A Seal: Poems'). Франкфурт-на-Майне: Посев. p. 52. OCLC 13629488.
- Моршен, Николай (1967). Двоеточие ('Punctuation: Colon'). Washington, D.C.: Victor Kamkin, Inc. p. 70. OCLC 3687073.
- Моршен, Николай (1979). Эхо и зеркало: (Идееподражание и дееподражание) ('Echo and Mirror'). Berkeley, CA: Berkeley Slavic specialties. p. 94. ISBN 9780933884090. OCLC 5264711.
- Моршен, Николай (1996). Собрание стихов. Oakland, CA: Berkeley Slavic specialties. p. 270. ISBN 9781572010246. OCLC 35164124.
- Моршен, Николай (2000). Владимир В. Агеносов (ed.). Пуще неволи. Стихи ('More than Captivity. Poems'). Moscow: Советский спорт. p. 376. ISBN 9785850096151. OCLC 47138229.
