= Britanskii Soiuznik =

British propaganda magazine (1942–1950)

- Categories: Propaganda magazine
- Frequency: Weekly
- Founded: 1942
- First issue: 10 July 1942
- Final issue: 1950
- Company: British Ministry of Information
- Language: Russian

Britanskii Soiuznik (Russian: British Ally) was a weekly British propaganda periodical which existed between 1942 and 1950.

== History and profile ==
Britanskii Soiuznik was launched by the British Ministry of Information in 1942. The first issue appeared on 10 July that year. The magazine was established as a result of the Soviet–British Treaty signed in 1942. Another publication entitled Britanskaia Khronika (Russian: The British Chronicle) was also started in the framework of this treaty.

Its stated goal was to tell the Russians the daily life of British people to establish a friendly relationship between two nations. George Reavey was the director of Britanskii Soiuznik which was published in Russian on a weekly basis. The magazine contained articles about military and cultural events emphasizing the collaboration between the United Kingdom and the Soviet Union and featured writings of the British writers. Children's literature by the British writers was also featured in the magazine.

Britanskii Soiuznik gained popularity among Russians in addition to the US propaganda publication Amerika. The popularity of Britanskii Soiuznik was not welcomed by the Soviet authorities from November 1946, and Viktor Abakumov, minister of state security, informed Joseph Stalin and Andrei Zhdanov about its increasing influence among the Soviet citizens. Abakumov asked them to take steps to restrict its effects and sales. Upon this the Soviet Department for Agitation and Propaganda fabricated a reader letter which contained negative statements about the magazine. This fake letter was approved by Stalin and sent to the editor of Britanskii Soiuznik. The criticisms against the magazine by the Soviet officials continued after this incident.

Britanskii Soiuznik reached the circulation of 14,000 copies in 1946 and had readers mostly in Moscow and in a few other Soviet cities. Its circulation was 50,000 copies in 1949.

Britanskii Soiuznik folded in 1950 due to tense relations between the United Kingdom and the Soviet Union.
