= Yelagin (surname) =

Yelagin or Elagin (feminine: Yelagina, Elagina) is a Russian-language surname. It may refer to:

- Yelagin family, Russian noble family
- Ekaterina Elagina, geologist, discoverer of the deposits of the Mir diamond mine
- Ivan Elagin (poet) (1918–1987), Russian Emigre poet
- Ivan Yelagin (1725–1794), Russian historian and poet, unofficial secretary to Catherine the Great
- Ivan Oleksandrovych Yelagin (1934–2007), Ukrainian poet
- Nikolay Elagin (1817–1891), Russian writer and notorious censor
- Olga Elagin, poet Olga Anstei
- Vasily Igorevich Yelagin, Russian mountaineer and explorer
- Vasily Ivanovich Yelagin (1743–?), Russian general
- Vladimir Yelagin (born 1955), Russian politician

== Fictional characters ==
- Yelagin, the protagonist of Ivan Bunin's novella Case of Cornet Yelagin (Дело корнета Елагина)
