= Novella Matveyeva =

Russian poet and singer (1934–2016)

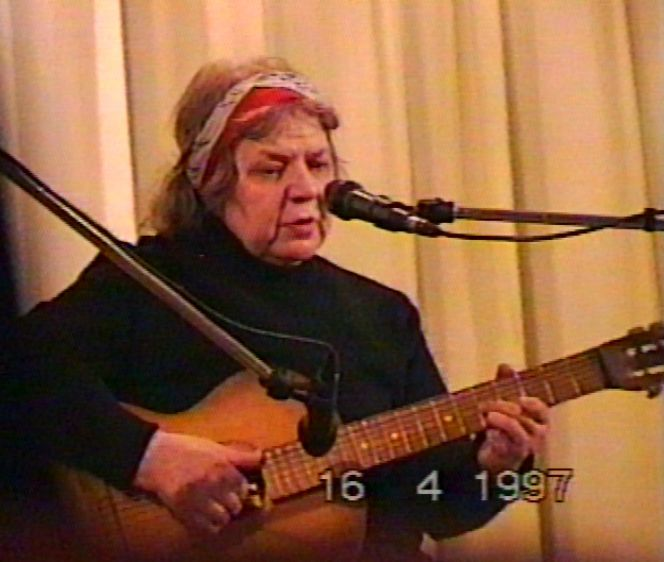
Novella Matveyeva

Novella Nikolayevna Matveyeva (Russian: Новелла Николаевна Матвеева; 7 October 1934 in Pushkin, Saint Petersburg – 4 September 2016, Moscow Oblast) was a Russian bard, poet, writer, screenwriter, dramatist, and literary scientist.

Novella was the cousin of poet Ivan Matveyev (Elagin). Her first collection of poetry was published in 1961, the same year she was admitted to the Union of Soviet Writers.

From the end of the 1950s, Matveyeva composed songs to her poetry and performed them, accompanying herself on a seven-string guitar.

Matveyeva died on 4 September 2016 at the age of 81.

== Awards ==
In 1998, Matveyeva received the Russian State Pushkin Prize in poetry, and in 2002, she received the Russian Federation State Prize in Literature and Arts for her poetry collection Jasmine.

== Books ==
- Swallow's School «Ласточкина школа» (1973)
- River «Река» (1978)
- The Law of Songs «Закон песен» (1983)
- Land of the Tide «Страна прибоя» (1983)
- Rabbit Village «Кроличья деревня» (1984)
- Selected «Избранное» (1986)
- Praise to Work «Хвала работе» (1987)
- Unbreakable Circle «Нерасторжимый круг» (1991)
- A Melody for the Guitar «Мелодия для гитары» (1998)
- Cassette of Dreams «Кассета снов» (1998)
- Sonnets «Сонеты» (1999)
- Caravan «Караван» (2000)
- Jasmine «Жасмин»(2011).
