= Olga Anstei =

Jewish-Ukrainian émigré poet (1912–1985)

Olga Anstei

Olga Nikolaevna Anstei also Olga Anstey (1 March 1912 – 30 May 1985; Ukrainian: Ольга Анстей), was a Jewish-Ukrainian émigré poet from Kiev. She was the wife of poet Ivan Elagin (Ukrainian: Іван Єлагін). Olga Anstei is best remembered for writing about the Holocaust. Her "Kirillovskie iary" (another name for Babi Yar) written in 1943, was one of the first-ever literary works on the subject of 1941 massacre of Ukrainian Jews in Kiev.

Olga Elagin and her husband defected together from the Soviet Union to the West in 1943. Their works were published side by side in the poetry anthology entitled Berega: Stikhi Poetov Vtoroi Emigratsii (Shores: Poetry of the Second Emigration) by Valentina Sinkevich, the first ever collection of works by the second wave of Jewish emigration from the Soviet Union. They divorced in 1950. She remarried, but divorced again. Olga Elagin died in New York City at the age of 73.

She is buried at the Russian Orthodox Convent Novo-Diveevo in Nanuet, New York.

== Selected works ==
- Door in the Wall (1949)
- Stephen Vincent Benet's The Devil and Daniel Webster (1960); translator
- In the Way (1976)
