= Amerika (magazine) =

US government magazine published in Russia during the Cold War

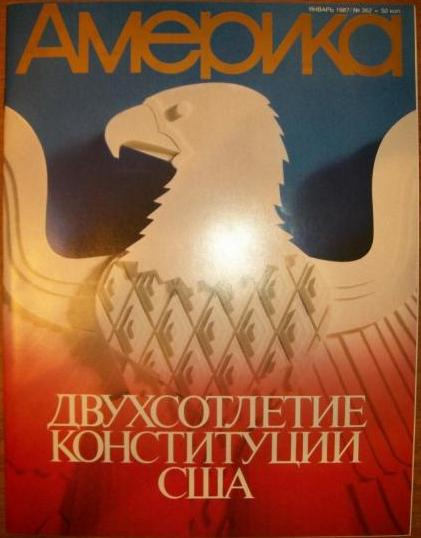
- 1987 edition, dedicated to the 200th anniversary of the U.S. Constitution
- Editor-in-chief: Robert Poteete
- Founded: 1944
- Final issue: 1994
- Language: Russian

Amerika (Russian: "Америка") was a Russian-language magazine published by the United States Department of State during the Cold War for distribution in the Soviet Union. It was intended to inform Soviet citizens about American life. Amerika was distinguished among other Soviet publications by its high-grade paper, bright printing and numerous photos. The magazine has been described as "polite propaganda" and featured high-quality photography and articles about everyday life in the United States, as well as profiles of famous American people and institutions. Later it briefly existed as America Illustrated. In total, 454 issues of the magazine were published.

== History ==
In 1944, the United States Department of State began circulating 10,000 copies of Amerika in the Soviet Union. The magazine was instantly popular and sold out virtually overnight. In June 1947, the Soviet Union authorized an increase to 50,000 copies. By the late 1940s, the State Department began to feel that radio and the Voice of America would be more effective propaganda tools and publication of Amerika was suspended in 1952. Four years later, however, the American and Soviet governments agreed to exchange magazines; Amerika was reborn and published in return for distribution of The USSR in the United States. The magazine was again an immediate success, selling out quickly. The goal, as explained in the first issue, was that "the Soviet reader could see the many-sided American life, reflected in it."

In his study of the propaganda of the era, University of Akron history professor Walter L. Hixson writes that Amerika was wildly popular among Soviet readers and notes that long lines would form when the magazine went on sale. Because the magazine sparked discussion among the Soviet intelligentsia and because each issue was widely shared, Amerika had impact and influence beyond its circulation of 50,000. The U.S. government felt that the magazine made a valuable contribution to better understanding of the United States by the Soviet people and was an effective counterpart to Soviet propaganda.

Sample articles published in Amerika include:

- A Skyscraper's Walls Built in One Day, a photo-story showing how the walls of a tower block on Park Avenue, New York were completed in a period of just 10 hours
- A Young Farmer Harvests 1,165 Poods (1 pood = approx 36 lbs) of Corn from One Hectare of Land
- Examples of Cheap Furniture, showing home furnishings all of which were cheaper than $25
- Supermarkets – A New Era in Shopping
- The Automobile – Inside and Outside
- The War on Polio
- A November, 1970 feature on brand-new children's TV show Sesame Street, written by Elinor Lander Horwitz, with behind-the-scenes photos from the show's very first season by David Attie; Abrams published Attie's photos from this shoot as the 2021 book "The Unseen Photos of Street Gang."
- A Prosthetic Surgeon
- A School Where Children Learn the Science of Life
- A School in the Open Air
- How to Make a Dress Simply in One Day
- How to Score Points in Basketball
- America's 1956 Automobiles
- A March 1972 cover photo of soon-to-be U.S. chess champion Bobby Fischer in the run-up to his world championship match, taken by photographer David Attie
- Fashions Under Twenty Dollars
- Best Dressed College Girls
- Television for the Millions
- Facts About the U.S.: The Negro Today
- Numerous articles about African-American jazz musicians
- Numerous articles about American artists

The magazine also published the translations of American literature into Russian, in particular the American poetry translated for it by such famous poets of the second wave of Russian emigration as Ivan Elagin and Nikolai Morshen.

The magazine ceased publication in October 1994.

Amerika is housed at many major research libraries in the U.S. Full runs of the Russian-language editions, as well as translations of the articles and records related to their distribution, are available at the National Archives and Records Administration's Archives II facility in College Park, Maryland.

== Notable contributors ==
From 1946 until 1952, Amerika was edited by Marion K. Sanders. The staff also included linguists Horace Lunt, David Simon (son of Solomon Simon) and Dick Burge.

Jane Jacobs worked for the magazine for many years, writing articles on American architecture, school planning, housing, slum clearance, and U.S. places and cities, presaging some of her work in The Death and Life of Great American Cities. Russian émigré Vera Aleksandrova wrote for the magazine from 1946 to 1948.

== Polish-language edition ==
Amerika was also published in a Polish-language edition, which is now archived at the National Archives and Records Administration's Archives II facility in College Park, Maryland. Polish resistance fighter Antoni Koper edited the Polish Ameryka from 1958 until his retirement in 1972.
