= Liudmila Titova =

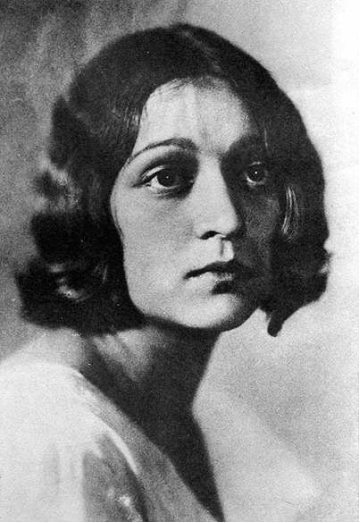
Liudmila Titova, Jewish-Ukrainian poet, author of 1941 "Babi Yar" poem

Liudmila Titova (Ukrainian: Людмила Титова, Russian: Людмила Титова) was a Jewish-Ukrainian poet from Kiev, wife of the poet Ivan Yelagin (Іван Єлагін) also from Kiev, whom she had first met as a schoolgirl. Her famous poem "Babi Yar" written in 1941 – discovered only in the 1990s – was the first-ever literary work devoted to the 1941 massacre of Ukrainian Jews during the Holocaust. She was an eyewitness of these events.

(excerpt in Russian)
Ты видишь, видишь снег кровавый
Идет, и все становится багряным.
Да, и такое снится киевлянам,
И я уже не верю, что когда-то
Была на свете «Аппассионата».

— Людмила Титова, 1941—1942, Киев,
