= Leonid Pervomayskiy =

Ukrainian poet

Leonid Solomonovych Pervomayskyi
- Леонід Соломонович Первомайський
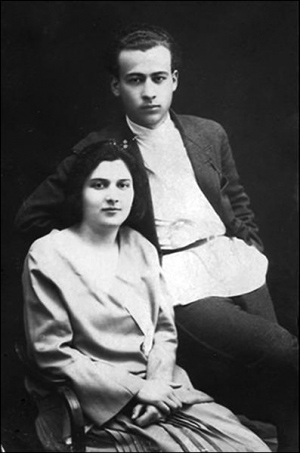
- Leonid Pervomayskyi with his wife Yevdokia (1927)
- Born: Illya Shlyomovych Hurevych; 17 May 1908; Konstantinograd
- Died: 9 December 1973 (aged 65); Kyiv, Ukrainian SSR, Soviet Union
- Burial place: Baikove Cemetery
- Occupation: Poet
- Awards: Stalin Prize (1946)

Leonid Solomonovych Pervomayskyi (Ukrainian: Леонід Соломонович Первомайський, birth name: Illya Shlyomovych Hurevych; 17 May 1908 – 9 December 1973), was a Jewish-Ukrainian poet, a winner of the 1946 Stalin Prize for literature and a member of the Communist Party since 1954.

Pervomayskyi was born in Konstantinograd (now Berestyn, Kharkiv region of Ukraine) to the family of a bookbinder. He worked in a factory, then at a library and a newspaper.

He began publishing in 1924 as a novelist, and in 1929 as a poet. During 1941-1945, he was a military reporter of the Pravda newspaper. After the World War II, he published a novel in verse called "Brother's Youth" (Молодість брата, 1947) and numerous collections of poetry. He was engaged in the translation of Heinrich Heine, Sándor Petőfi, Julius Fučík.

He had been criticized by the Communist Party for the so-called "ideological errors".

Pervomayskyi died on 9 December 1973. He was buried in Kyiv at the Baikove Cemetery.

He was a recipient of a number of military and civil decorations.

== Awards and honors ==
- 1943 – Order of the Red Banner
- 1946 – Stalin Prize, 2nd class (for collections of poetry «День народження» ("The Birthday") and «Земля» ("The Land"))
- 1960 – Order of the Badge of Honour
- 1967 – Order of the Red Banner of Labour
- Order of the Patriotic War, 1st class
