= Ivan Elagin (poet) =

Soviet poet

Ivan Elagin after World War II

Ivan Elagin (December 1, 1918 – February 8, 1987; Russian: Иван Венедиктович Елагин, real name Ivan Matveyev) was a Russian émigré poet, one of the two most famous ones, along with Nikolai Morshen, of the second wave of Russian emigration, born in Vladivostok. He was the husband of poet Olga Anstei, best remembered for writing about the Holocaust.

== Life ==
Ivan Matveyev was born in Vladivostok in Siberia and studied medicine in Kiev in the 1930s. He was the first cousin of poet Novella Matveyeva. During World War II he remained in Kiev under the German occupation, and after the war served as a medic, and spent several years in displaced persons' camps before immigrating to the United States.

Elagin and his wife Olga left the Soviet Union to the West with the retreating German army in 1943. Their works were published side by side in the poetry anthology entitled Berega: Stikhi Poetov Vtoroi Emigratsii (Shores: Poetry of the Second Emigration) by Valentina Sinkevich, the first ever collection of works by the second wave of Jewish emigration from the Soviet Union. They divorced in New York in 1950. Elagin became professor in the Department of Slavic Languages and Literatures at the University of Pittsburgh; a post held until his death from cancer in 1987.

Professor Elagin was also affiliated with the Russian School at the Middlebury College Language Schools program. He was appointed as Visiting Poet-Lecturer in 1969 by Robert L. Baker, Dean and Director of the Russian Summer School.
