= Belogorye =

Belogorye may refer to:

- Belogorye (geography), a type of mountain also known as "Belki"
- Belogorye, Voronezh Oblast, a village in Voronezh Oblast, Russia
- Belogorye (selo, Amur Oblast), a village in Amur Oblast, Russian Far East
- Belogorye (station, Amur Oblast), a rural locality in Amur Oblast, Russian Far East
- Belogorye Nature Reserve, a protected area in Belgorod Oblast, Russia

== See also ==
- Belogorie
