= List of interracial romance films =

This is a list of interracial romance films.

The films in this list satisfy the following requirements:

- A professional critic or film scholar has identified it as an interracial romance film.
- The film has been released.
- The film is feature length (e.g. not a segment from an anthology).
- The film features a romantic relationship, not just partnering, between people of different races.
- The film's inclusion or casting of interracial romance is not incidental.
- The film is not about romance between species or fictional races (e.g. Star Trek, The Twilight Saga, Shrek, The Little Mermaid).

Title	Director	Summary	Year	Notes	References
The Bronze Bride	Henry MacRae	A Canadian fur trapper takes a Native American woman as his bride, a union that meets with much disapproval when they return to civilization.	1917		
The Forbidden City	Sidney Franklin	A Chinese princess betrothed to the Chinese Emperor is sentenced to death when she secretly marries an American diplomat and becomes pregnant.	1918		
The Heart of Wetona	Sidney Franklin	The mixed-race daughter of a Comanche chief falls in love with a young engineer. When the young man deserts her, she turns to a white Indian agent who marries her.	1919		
Broken Blossoms	D. W. Griffith	A young Londoner abused by her alcoholic father, a Limehouse District prizefighter, is befriended by a sensitive Chinese immigrant with tragic consequences.	1919		
Othello	Dimitri Buchowetzki	The treacherous Iago plots to ruin the life of Othello by provoking him to jealousy. Based on the play of the same name by William Shakespeare.	1922		
The Toll of the Sea	Chester M. Franklin	While visiting China, an American man falls in love with a young Chinese woman, but he then has second thoughts about the relationship.	1922		
The Ten Commandments	Cecil B. DeMille	An American man loves a Chinese woman.	1923		
Piccadilly	Ewald André Dupont	A young Chinese woman, working in the kitchen of a London nightclub, is given the chance to become the club's main act, which soon leads to a plot of betrayal, forbidden love and murder.	1929		
Cimarron	Wesley Ruggles		1931		
Bird of Paradise	King Vidor	A Polynesian girl falls in love when an American sailor visits to her island, but she is promised to a prince on a nearby island.	1932		
Black Pearl	Michał Waszyński	A Polish sailor returns home from Tahiti with a native girl and a fortune in sacred pearls. He is seduced by a married woman, unaware she is part of a plot to steal his riches.	1932		
The Bitter Tea of General Yen	Frank Capra	A Chinese warlord and an engaged Christian missionary fall in love during the Chinese Civil War.	1933		
Princess Tam Tam	Edmond T. Gréville	A French writer traveling in Tunisia becomes infatuated with a local girl and invites her back to his country, where she is introduced to Parisian high society.	1935		
Ramona	Henry King		1936		
God's Step Children	Oscar Micheaux		1938		
Duel in the Sun	King Vidor		1946		
Pinky	Elia Kazan	An African-American nurse who was born light-skinned and passes for white in the North returns to her Southern hometown. She and a white Northern doctor are in love, but she eventually turns down his offer of marriage in order to stay and help her community.	1949		
Broken Arrow	Delmer Daves	A dramatization of the story of a white man Tom Jeffords and his interactions with the Apache nation, including falling in love with and marrying an Apache girl named Sonseeahray.	1950		
The Wild North	Andrew Marton		1952		
Othello	Orson Welles	Based on the play of the same name by William Shakespeare.	1952	Won the Palme d'Or at the Cannes Film Festival in 1952.	
Captain John Smith and Pocahontas	Lew Landers		1953		
His Majesty O'Keefe	Byron Haskin		1954		
The Purple Plain	Robert Parrish	A pilot of the Royal Air Force falls in love with a Burmese woman during the Burma Campaign of World War II	1954		
White Feather	Robert D. Webb	A white boy marries a Native American woman.	1955		
House of Bamboo	Samuel Fuller		1955		
Love Is a Many-Splendored Thing	Henry King		1955		
Seven Cities of Gold	Robert D. Webb		1955		
The Indian Fighter	Andre De Toth	A trail scout leads a wagon train bound for Oregon through hostile Indian territory and unwittingly gets involved with the daughter of a Sioux chieftain.	1955		
The Black Tent	Brian Desmond Hurst		1956		
Giant	George Stevens		1956		
The Halliday Brand	Joseph H. Lewis		1957		
War Drums	Reginald LeBorg		1957		
Island in the Sun	Robert Rossen		1957	Hollywood's first interracial kiss	
Run of the Arrow	Samuel Fuller		1957		
Band of Angels	Raoul Walsh	A young woman, raised as white by her father, a wealthy plantation owner, discovers after his death that she is half black. After she is sold in New Orleans, she and her owner fall in love.	1957		
Sayonara	Joshua Logan	Two U.S. Air Force pilots fall in love with a pair of Japanese women.	1957	Won four Academy Awards	
Touch of Evil	Orson Welles		1958		
China Doll	Frank Borzage	During World War II, a white American pilot gets drunk one night and unintentionally buys a young Chinese woman from her destitute father.	1958		
Kings Go Forth	Delmer Daves		1958		
Night of the Quarter Moon	Hugo Haas	A newlywed husband's family objects that his wife is mixed'race.	1959		
The World, the Flesh and the Devil	Ranald MacDougall	In a post-apocalyptic world, a black man and a white woman appear to be the only survivors. Then a white man shows up.	1959		
Hiroshima, mon amour	Alain Resnais		1959		
I Spit on Your Graves	Michel Gast		1959		
The Crimson Kimono	Samuel Fuller		1959		
Another Sky	Gavin Lambert		1954		
Shadows	John Cassavetes	A light-skinned black woman falls in love with a white man who is unaware of her race.	1959		
The World of Suzie Wong	Richard Quine	An American painter falls for a Chinese prostitute in Hong Kong.	1960		
My Baby is Black!	Claude Bernard-Aubert		1961		
Flame in the Streets	Roy Ward Baker		1961		
Bridge to the Sun	Etienne Périer	A biographical film about the marriage of Gwen Harold and Japanese diplomat Hidenari "Terry" Terasaki leading up to World War II.	1961	Nominated for one Golden Globe.	
A Majority of One	Mervyn LeRoy	A Jewish-American widow from Brooklyn falls in love with a millionaire businessman while touring Japan.	1961	Won Golden Globes for "Best Motion Picture" (Musical/Comedy) and "Best Film Promoting International Understanding".	
All Night Long	Basil Dearden	A modern-day version of William Shakespeare's Othello set in the jazz scene of Swinging London.	1962		
Diamond Head	Guy Green	A family drama set on a Hawaiian plantation.	1962		
A Taste of Honey	Tony Richardson	A whitebread young English girl becomes pregnant by a black sailor, befriends a homosexual, and gradually becomes a woman.	1961	Four BAFTA awards	
One Potato, Two Potato	Larry Peerce	A white divorcee marries an African American.	1964		
A Patch of Blue	Guy Green	A blind teenage girl is befriended by a black office worker with whom she eventually falls in love.	1965		
Othello	Stuart Burge	Based on the play of the same name by William Shakespeare.	1965		
Guess Who's Coming to Dinner	Stanley Kramer	A young woman surprises her liberal parents by bringing her African-American fiancé to visit.	1967	Winner of two Oscar Awards	
The Story of a Three-Day Pass	Melvin Van Peebles	A black U.S. soldier spends the weekend in Paris with a French shop clerk.	1968		
Joanna	Michael Sarne	An English art student enjoys a string of lovers in Swinging London eventually becoming the mistress of a black nightclub owner.	1968		
100 Rifles	Tom Gries	An African-American lawman reluctantly becomes involved in a Yaqui rebellion against the Mexican government.	1969		
The Liberation of L.B. Jones	William Wyler	A wealthy African-American funeral director is murdered by his wife's lover, a white police officer.	1970		
The Landlord	Hal Ashby	A privileged WASP becomes landlord of an inner-city tenement building and begins a relationship with a black nightclub dancer.	1970		
The Grasshopper	Jerry Paris	An African-American ex-football player falls in love with a Las Vegas showgirl. When she is sexually assaulted by a wealthy patron, he viciously beats her attacker and the two are forced to go on the run.	1970		
The Hawaiians	Tom Gries	In Hawaii around the end of the 19th century, the black sheep of a prosperous white family marries a mentally unstable Hawaiian. Later, his son falls in love with the daughter of one of his Chinese immigrant workers.	1970		
Dreams of Glass	Robert Clouse	Two California teenagers, a Japanese-American girl and a fisherman's son, secretly keep their budding romance a secret from their parents.	1970		
The Great White Hope	Martin Ritt	A fictionalized account of the turbulent relationship between African-American boxer Jack Johnson and his first wife, New York socialite Etta Terry Duryea.	1970		
Little Big Man	Arthur Penn	A white boy is captured, raised by Cheyenne, falls in love with an American Indian woman.	1970		
The Omega Man	Boris Sagal	White army doctor Robert Neville struggles to create a cure for the plague that wiped out most of the human race and, in the meantime, falls in love with African-American survivor Lisa.	1971		
Honky	William A. Graham	Two high school students, a wealthy African-American girl and poor white teenager, begin a relationship.	1971		
Georgia, Georgia	Stig Björkman	An African-American nightclub singer falls in love with a U.S. Army deserter while performing in Stockholm.	1972		
Together for Days	Michael Schultz	An African-American radical activist and a white woman experience a variety of reactions when their family and friends discover their relationship.	1972		
Heavy Traffic (animation/live-action)	Ralph Bakshi	A young New York cartoonist (played by Joseph Kaufmann) has surreal fantasies which include a romance with a female African-American bartender (Carole).	1973		
Magnum Force	Ted Post	Dirty Harry is hit on by his Asian American neighbor Sunny (played by Adele Yoshioka) and this leads to a physical relationship and possible romance. Sunny asks "What does a girl have to do to go to bed with you?" and, after blinking twice, Harry Callahan replies "Try knocking on the door". Screenwriter John Milius, has said that this part of the film is in the script because Eastwood received a lot of fan mail from Asian women that included sexual propositions.	1973		
Ali: Fear Eats the Soul	Rainer Werner Fassbinder	The film revolves around the romance that develops between Emmi, an elderly German woman, and Ali, a Moroccan migrant worker in post-World War II Germany.	1974		
Arabian Nights	Pier Paolo Pasolini	Nur-ed-Din searches for his missing African slave girl/ lover Zummurrud. Also the subplot of Prince Tagi and Princess Dunya.	1974		
Mandingo	Richard Fleischer	A white slave master shows more affection for his black slave lover than his wife, who responds by seducing a male slave.	1975	Golden Screen Award	
Aaron Loves Angela	Gordon Parks, Jr.	A teenage couple, an African-American and a Puerto Rican, live in the slums of New York City.	1975		
The Human Factor	Otto Preminger	An MI6 official becomes the focus of an internal investigation when a mole is suspected of leaking information to the South African apartheid government.	1979		
My Beautiful Laundrette	Stephen Frears	Focuses on the same-sex romance between a young Pakistani man and a street punk white man.	1985		
The Karate Kid Part II	John G. Avildsen	The main character, who is Italian, falls in love with a Japanese girl.	1986		
Soul Man	Steve Miner	A white man who takes tanning pills to appear black to get a college scholarship falls in love with the black woman who was supposed to get the scholarship he took from her.	1986		
The Squeeze	Roger Young		1987		
La Bamba	Luis Valdez		1987		
China Girl	Abel Ferrara	An Italian boy and Chinese girl falls in love.	1987		
Hairspray	John Waters	Teenager Tracy Turnblad becomes the hero in trying to get a TV dance show integrated in 1962 Baltimore, while a romantic relationship between Penny Pingleton and Seaweed is sparked.	1988		
Mama, There's a Man in Your Bed	Coline Serreau	A French comedy about a business owner who is framed during a food-poisoning scandal and turns to help from a cleaning woman.	1989		
Pummarò	Michele Placido		1990		
Letters from Alou	Montxo Armendáriz	A Senegalese immigrant in Spain writes a series of letters of his adventures; he falls in love with a woman there, but is eventually deported.	1990		
Come See the Paradise	Alan Parker	A New York Irish-American labor union organizer falls in love with his employer's daughter. Set during the internment of Japanese-Americans during World War II.	1990		
Flirting	John Duigan	The sequel to The Year My Voice Broke, an Australian boy becomes hopelessly in love with an African exchange student.	1991		
Jungle Fever	Spike Lee	A successful African-American architect has an affair with his Italian-American secretary.	1991		
Mississippi Masala	Mira Nair	An African-American man and an Indian immigrant begin a relationship despite the disapproval of both their families.	1992		
Indochine	Régis Wargnier		1992		
One False Move	Carl Franklin	An African-American woman, in the company of fugitives, returns to her hometown where her ex-lover is the local sheriff.	1992		
The Lover	Jean-Jacques Annaud	In 1950s French Indochina, a French teenage girl has an affair with a wealthy, older Chinese merchant.	1992	Nominated for Best Foreign Film at Awards of the Japanese Academy in 1993.	
The Bodyguard	Mick Jackson	A white bodyguard (Frank) and the African-American singer he is assigned to protect form a romantic relationship.	1992		
Zebrahead	Anthony Drazan	Relationship between two inner city teenagers in Detroit.	1992	Won Grand Jury Award at the Sundance Film Festival in 2006.	
Made in America	Richard Benjamin		1993		
The Wedding Banquet	Ang Lee	A Taiwanese-American man who's in a relationship his gay white lover reluctantly marries a mainland Chinese woman to placate his parents and help her obtain a green card.	1993		
The Ballad of Little Jo	Maggie Greenwald		1993		
A Bronx Tale	Robert De Niro	An Italian-American boy, Calogero falls in love with an African-American girl, Jane.	1993		
The Joy Luck Club	Wayne Wang	Relationship between four young Chinese-American women born in America and their respective mothers born in feudal China.	1993	Winner of the Young Artist Awards in 2004.	
Double Happiness	Mina Shum	A Canadian-born Chinese girl falls in love with a white university student.	1994	Winner of Best Canadian Feature Film at Toronto International Film Festival in 1994.	
Foreign Student	Eva Sereny	A young French college student studies in America and falls in love a black teacher.	1994		
Corrina, Corrina	Jessie Nelson		1994		
The Jungle Book	Stephen Sommers	Mowgli-who is Indian-and Kitty-who is British-are childhood friends who later become lovers.	1994		
Talking About Sex	Aaron Speiser		1994		
Bleeding Hearts	Gregory Hines		1995		
The Incredibly True Adventure of Two Girls in Love	Maria Maggenti	Randy and Evie have an interracial teenage lesbian romance.	1995		
Jefferson in Paris	James Ivory		1995		
The Affair (1995 film)	Paul Seed		1995		
Pocahontas (animation)	Mike Gabriel, Eric Goldberg	Pocahontas, a Powhatan Indian woman falls in love with John Smith, a white settler in 17th century Virginia	1995		
Madame Butterfly	Frédéric Mitterrand		1995		
Othello	Oliver Parker		1995		
The Watermelon Woman	Cheryl Dunye		1996		
Fools Rush In	Andy Tennant		1997		
Fakin' da Funk	Tim Chey	A Chinese teenager whose adoptive parents are black falls in love with a black girl.	1997		
Cinderella	Robert Iscove	A more ethnically diverse take on the Cinderella tale. Cinderella (played by Brandy) is black, while the Prince is of Asian descent. Also, the King is white while the Queen is also black.	1997		
Chinese Box	Wayne Wang	Romance between a Western reporter and a Chinese woman during the return of Hong Kong to China.	1997	Nominated for the Golden Lion at the Venice Film Festival in 1997.	
One Night Stand	Mike Figgis	A black Los Angeles commercial director has an affair with a white woman in New York. (He is married to a Chinese-American woman and his lover is engaged to his gay friend's brother.)	1997		
Tomorrow Never Dies	Roger Spottiswoode	James Bond partners with a Chinese spy to stop a media mogul from starting World War III.	1997		
Jackie Brown	Quentin Tarantino	The title character is a black drug-smuggling flight attendant who is wooed by a white bail bondsman.	1997		
Boogie Nights	Paul Thomas Anderson	A black man, Buck marries Jessie St. Vincent, a white woman and she gave birth to their biracial child.	1997		
Heaven's Burning	Craig Lahiff		1998		
Restaurant	Eric Bross	A romance develops between two waiters, both aspiring to enter the entertainment industry.	1998	Jury Award winner for Best Drama at the Atlantic City Film Festival in 1999.	
Bulworth	Warren Beatty	A white senator pursues a romantic relationship with a young black activist.	1998		
Besieged	Bernardo Bertolucci		1998		
Next Time	Alan L. Fraser		1998	Won the "Hollywood Discovery Award" and "Hollywood Independent Filmmaker Award" at the Hollywood Film Festival in 1998.	
The Breaks	Eric Meza		1999		
Row Your Boat	Sollace Mitchell		1999	Won "Audience Choice Award" at the Stony Brook Film Festival in 1999.	
Colorz of Rage	Dale Resteghini		1999		
The Annihilation of Fish	Charles Burnett		1999		
Liberty Heights	Barry Levinson	A Jewish white man falls in love with a black girl at a recently desegregated school.	1999		
The Secret Laughter of Women	Peter Schwabach		1999		
Unbowed	Nanci Rossov	Set after the Civil War, a defiant Native American man and a high-spirited black woman fall in love while attending college.	1999	Won "Best Film" at the American Indian Film Festival in 1999.	
Romeo Must Die	Andrzej Bartkowiak	A Romeo and Juliet story set between African-American and Asian families.	2000		
Catfish in Black Bean Sauce	Chi Muoi Lo	A comedy-drama about a Vietnamese brother and sister raised by an African-American couple.	2000		
Mission: Impossible 2	John Woo	Ethan Hunt, a white man, has a romance with Nyah, a black woman, as they try to recover a virus.	2000		
O	Tim Blake Nelson	Retelling of Othello with modern high school students.	2001		
Save the Last Dance	Duane Adler	A teenage white girl (played by Julia Stiles) from the Midwest and an African-American teenage male from South Side Chicago fall in love though their mutual love of dancing.	2001		
Crazy/Beautiful	John Stockwell	Nicole Oakley, the spoiled, rich, out-of-control daughter of congressman Tom Oakley, meets a working class Mexican-American straight-A student, Carlos Nuñez, resulting in a clash of cultures, values, and a love affair.	2001		
Jump Tomorrow	Joel Hopkins	A young Nigerian man on the verge of being in an arranged marriage, suddenly questions his situation after an encounter with a stunning Latin woman, who is also about to be married.	2001		
Monster's Ball	Marc Forster	After a family tragedy, a white racist prison guard reexamines his attitudes while falling in love with the African-American widow (played by Halle Berry) of the last prisoner he executed.	2001		
The Royal Tenenbaums	Wes Anderson	A white woman, Etheline marries a black man.	2001		
Far From Heaven	Todd Haynes	Housewife has flirtation with her African-American gardener	2002		
Bend It Like Beckham	Gurinder Chadha	Jess (played by Parminder Nagra), a young woman whose Sikh parents moved from Uganda to London, defies their traditional expectations to play football and begins a romantic relationship with her white coach.	2003		
Holes	Andrew Davis	Camp Green’s background is a story of the main characters’ ancestors, told in flashbacks throughout the film. Kate is a Caucasian schoolteacher whose love for Sam, an African-American onion salesman leads to tragedy when the town persecutes them for their love.	2003		
Bollywood Queen	Jeremy Wooding	A British Indian take on Romeo and Juliet in which Geena, a young Gujarati woman, and Jay, a young Scottish man, fall in love while trying to keep their relationship a secret from their rival families.	2003		
Love Actually	Richard Curtis	Two characters central to the plot get married in the beginning of the film. The bride is white (played by Keira Knightley) while the groom (Peter) is African-British.	2003		
The Haunted Mansion	Rob Minkoff	A mixed-race woman seemingly poisons herself, and her white fiance hangs himself in grief.	2003		
Napoleon Dynamite	Jared Hess	A white man, Kip has a girlfriend, LaFawnduh, is black and they got married at the end.	2004		
Guess Who	Kevin Rodney Sullivan	Romantic comedy about an African-American girl (played by Zoe Saldaña) introducing her white fiancé (played by Ashton Kutcher) to her parents.	2005		
Hitch	Andy Tennant	An African-American man, Alex "Hitch" Hitchens is attracted to Sara, who's Latina.	2005		
The New World	Terrence Malick	A Native American woman Pocahontas falls in love and later marries an English settler man John Rolfe. They also later have a biracial son Thomas Rolfe.	2005		
The White Masai	Hermine Huntgeburth	Based on an autobiographical novel, a white German woman falls in love and has a child with a Masai man.	2005		
Romancing the Bride	Kris Isacsson	Romantic comedy about a confused bride, Melissa, who wakes hand-cuffed to a Mexican stranger who claims to be her husband; she has no recollection of the marriage after having consumed a Mexican "moonshine" drink and having forgotten the events that occurred the previous night.	2005		
Something New	Sanaa Lathan	Romantic comedy about an African-American woman falling in love with her Caucasian landscape gardener.	2006		
Falling for Grace	Fay Ann Lee	Romantic comedy about a relationship between a Chinese (raised in America) woman and a white American based on a quid pro quo.	2006		
Rome & Jewel	Charles T. Kanganis, Neil Bagg	Musical take on Romeo & Juliet with a black man and white girl.	2006		
Lakeview Terrace	Neil LaBute	Thriller about a LAPD sergeant who terrorizes his new next-door neighbors because they are an interracially married couple.	2008		
Our Family Wedding	Rick Famuyiwa	An African-American man plans to marry a Mexican-American woman, but they must meet each other's families.	2010		
My Last Day Without You	Stefan C. Schaefer	German executive meets a young African-American female musician who exposes a new side of NYC to him.	2011		
Belle	Amma Asante	Period drama set in the 18th century about Dido Belle, the illegitimate daughter of a black former slave and a white British naval officer, who is raised by her wealthy great-uncle, but struggles to find her place in society.	2013		
A Madea Christmas	Tyler Perry	A black schoolteacher tries to hide from her mother that she is married to a white man.	2013		
Out of the Furnace	Scott Cooper	Russell Baze is white and his ex-girlfriend, Lena Taylor, is Latina.	2013		
House of Secrets	Fred Olen Ray	A newly divorced black woman tries to figure out who has been breaking into her house given to her by her ex-husband	2014		
Dr. Cabbie	Jean-François Pouliot	An Indian doctor turned cab driver falls in love with a pregnant white Canadian woman	2014		
Infinitely Polar Bear	Maya Forbes	A Caucasian father struggling with bipolar disorder tries to win back his African-American wife by attempting to take full responsibility of their two young, spirited daughters, who do not make the difficult task any easier.	2014		
5 Flights Up	Richard Loncraine	A long-time married couple (African-American male/Caucasian female) who have spent their lives together in the same New York apartment become overwhelmed by personal and real estate-related issues when they plan to move away.	2014		
Born to Be Blue	Robert Budreau	A partly fictional biopic about Chet Baker, focusing on his romance with (and engagement to) an African-American actress in 1960s Los Angeles.	2015		
Focus	Denise Di Novi	Will Smith and Margot Robbie; Nicky (Will Smith), a veteran con artist, takes a novice named Jess (Margot Robbie) under his wing. While Nicky teaches Jess the tricks of the trade, the pair become romantically involved.	2015		
Bazodee	Todd Kessler	The dutiful Indian daughter of a deep-in-debt businessman is about to marry a wealthy Londoner when a chance encounter with local Trinidadian singer sets things askew.	2015		
Black	Adil El Arbi & Bilall Fallah	A 15-year-old girl in a black gang in Brussels must choose between loyalty and love when she falls for a Moroccan boy from a rival gang.	2015		
The Revenant	Alejandro G. Iñárritu	A white man, Hugh Glass, had a now-deceased Native American wife, resulting in a biracial son named Hawk.	2015		
Sophie and the Rising Sun	Maggie Greenwald	A white Southern woman falls in love with a Nisei man on the eve of Pearl Harbor.	2016		
A United Kingdom	Amma Asante	A white British woman marries Seretse Khama, a black African chief.	2016		
Loving	Jeff Nichols	The real-life courage and commitment of an interracial couple, Richard and Mildred Loving, who spent nine years fighting their civil rights case, Loving v. Virginia, up to the Supreme Court which, in 1967, reaffirmed their right to marry.	2016		
Get Out	Jordan Peele	A black man visits his white girlfriend's town and family, but not everything in the town is as it seems.	2017		
The Big Sick	Michael Showalter	Based on the real life story of how Pakistani-American Comedian Kumail Nanjiani met his wife, in which he plays himself. Kumail falls in love with and dates Emily after she heckles him, but they break up when Emily finds out his family want an arranged marriage with a Muslim girl. However, Emily falls into a coma due to a brain infection and Kumail meets and spends time with Emily's family during her recovery.	2017		
Everything, Everything	Stella Meghie	A black girl falls in love with a white boy who lives next door.	2017		
The Greatest Showman	Michael Gracey	Inspired by the story of P. T. Barnum's creation of the Barnum & Bailey Circus, and the lives of its star attractions, including a white aristocrat and African-American trapeze artist.	2017		
The Chinese Widow	Bille August	In the 1940s, the Japanese attack on Pearl Harbor destroyed Americans' morale. A young white pilot was saved by a young local Asian widow. Despite not being able to communicate verbally, they fell for each other and a tear-jerking love story went on between the two.	2017		
Love, Simon	Greg Berlanti	A white teenage boy whose anonymous online pen pal is an African-American Jewish teenage boy	2018		
Running for Grace	David L. Cunningham	A mixed-race orphan uses his blazing speed to deliver medicine to the coffee pickers in the mountains of 1920s Hawaii. Young love soon blossoms when he begins a forbidden romance with the white daughter of a plantation owner.	2018		
Where Hands Touch	Amma Asante	A black girl of a German mother and a French African soldier falls in love with a young German soldier during World War II.	2018		
To All the Boys I've Loved Before	Susan Johnson	A Korean-American teenage girl and a white teenage boy begin dating after he reads her letter.	2018		
Candy Jar	Ben Shelton	A black high-schooler falls in love with his white rival on the school debate team	2018		
The Hate U Give	George Tillman Jr.	An African-American girl, Starr Carter and her white boyfriend, Chris Bryant.	2018		
Blockers	Kay Cannon	A interracial couple of white husband, Mitchell Mannes and Indian wife Marcie Mannes. Their biracial daughter, Kayla Mannes goes to prom with her white prom date, Connor Aldrich.	2018		
The Darkest Minds	Jennifer Yuh Nelson	A white boy, Liam Stewart falls in love with a biracial girl.	2018		
The Sun Is Also A Star	Ry Russo-Young	As part of an experiment, a teenage black girl falls in love with an Asian-American medical student within a day whilst her family faces deportation	2019		
Blinded by the Light	Gurinder Chadha	Inspired by the true story about the life of Sarfraz Manzoor, a British Pakistani teenager falls in love with a white British teenager girl since they have a common love of Bruce Springsteen	2019	Drama	
Waves	Trey Edward Shults	An African-American boy, Tyler was in love with Alexis, who is Mexican-American, and his sister, Emily falls in love with a white boy, Luke.	2019		
Yesterday	Danny Boyle	An Indian-British man, Jack Malik, falls in love with a white British woman Ellie Appleton with their love of music and The Beatles.	2019		
All the Bright Places	Brett Haley	After meeting each other, two teenagers struggle with the emotional and physical scars of their pasts. They discover that even the smallest moments can mean something. The main character is white, while her love interest is mixed.	2020		
The Lovebirds	Michael Showalter	A couple (South Asian man and African-American woman) experiences a defining moment in their relationship when they are unintentionally embroiled in a murder mystery.	2020		
All My Life	Marc Meyers	Based on the true story of Solomon Chau and Jennifer Carter, a young couple that rushes to put their wedding together after Solomon is diagnosed with liver cancer. Jennifer is white, while Solomon is of East Asian descent.	2020		
On the Rocks	Sofia Coppola	A married couple of a biracial wife and black husband.	2020		
Words on Bathroom Walls	Thor Freudenthal	A white boy, Adam Petrazelli and his black girlfriend, Maya Arnez.	2020		
The Broken Hearts Gallery	Natalie Krinsky	A white boy, Nick falls in love with an Indian-American girl, Lucy and started working together.	2020		
Ali & Ava	Clio Barnard	Ali is a taxi driver of Pakistani descent, living with his soon-to-be ex-wife. Ava is a teacher who lives in very white working class Holme Wood, near her adult children. Both, lonely for different reasons, find friendship initially through shared affection for one of Ava's students, then attraction over a shared love of music, then the reality of familial entanglements and prejudices stacked against them.	2021		
Boogie	Eddie Huang	A Chinese-American basketball phenom in Queens, New York, Alfred "Boogie" Chin struggles to balance the pressure from his traditional parents to earn a scholarship to an elite college over chasing his NBA dreams. Along the way, he begins a romantic relationship with an African-American classmate named Eleanor.	2021		
Love Hard	Hernán Jiménez	A young woman travels to her online crush's hometown for Christmas, but discovers she's been catfished. The main character is white, while her love interest is Chinese American.	2021		
Moxie	Amy Poehler	A white feminist girl, Vivian Carter, and her Asian boyfriend, Seth Acosta, supports her feminism campaign.	2021		
Bodies Bodies Bodies	Halina Reijn	An African-American girl, Sophie and her Eastern European girlfriend, Bee.	2022		
Bones and All	Luca Guadagnino	A biracial (black and white) cannibalistic girl, Maren Yearly falls in love with a white cannibalistic boy, Lee.	2022		
Nope	Jordan Peele	An Asian man, Ricky "Jupe" Park and his white wife, Amber Park.	2022		
Something from Tiffany's	Daryl Wein	A black man who falls in love with a white woman at Christmas.	2022		
You People	Kenya Barris	A Secular Jewish man, Ezra and his black Nation of Islam wife, Amira are in love.	2023		
Asteroid City	Wes Anderson	A white man, Schubert Green and his Asian ex-wife, Polly Green. Junior Stargazer winner, Woodrow, who is white, develops a relationship with other awardee, Dinah, who is brown.	2023		
Killers of the Flower Moon	Martin Scorsese	Ernest Burkhart, a white murderer and his Native American wife, Mollie Kyle.	2023		
Past Lives	Celine Song	A Korean woman, Nora Moon, has a husband, Arthur Zaturansky, who's Jewish-American.	2023		
Bottoms	Emma Seligman	A black girl, Josie and her biracial (white and Asian) girlfriend, Isabel.	2023		
Somebody I Used to Know	Dave Franco	Ally is white and her ex-boyfriend, Sean, is black.	2023		
Origin	Ava DuVernay	A black author woman and her white husband.	2023		
Hell of a Summer	Billy Bryk and Finn Wolfhard	A white boy, Chris falls in love with a black girl, Shannon at summer camp.	2023		
Black Tea	Abderrahmane Sissako	Aya is black and her love-interest, Cai, is Chinese.	2024	World premiere at the 74th Berlin International Film Festival in Competition.	
Megalopolis	Francis Ford Coppola	A interracial government couple of black husband, Mayor Franklyn Cicero and white wife Teresa Cicero. They have a biracial daughter, Julia Cicero.	2024		
Back in Action	Seth Gordon	CIA operative couple of black husband, Matt and white wife, Emily.	2025		
Freakier Friday	Nisha Ganatra	Anna Coleman, who's white, new fiancé, Eric Reyes, is Filipino.	2025		
Red Silk	Andrey Volgin (film director)	Artyom Svetlov (Gleb Kalyuzhny), Russian Chekist and Wang Lin (Zheng Hanyi) Chinese diplomat and courier. The romance in this film symbolizes the deep ties between the countries of the Russia and China.	2025		
One Battle After Another	Paul Thomas Anderson	A white man, Bob Ferguson and his wife, Perfidia Beverly Hills, is black. They have a biracial daughter, Willa Ferguson.	2025		
The Drama	Kristoffer Borgli	An engaged couple of an African-American fiancée Emma Harwood and white British fiancé Charlie Thompson.	2026		
