= Leonid Mashinskiy =

Russian actor, director, producer and writer (born 1963)

Leonid Mashinsky
- Born: Leonid Aleksandrovich Mashinsky; 6 February 1963 (age 63); Moscow, USSR
- Education: Moscow State Forest University
- Occupations: Poet, actor, film director and producer, screenwriter

Leonid Mashinsky (born 6 February 1963, Moscow, USSR) is a Russian poet, actor, film director and producer and screenwriter.

== Education and career ==
Mashinsky studied at a school with a mathematical bias, then graduated from the full-time department of the Moscow State Forest University in 1985. Later, he worked in many fields, including record of soundtracks for films. He was a sponsor of the Moscow film festival "Joint" from 2000 to 2003.

=== Works ===
Mashinsky was published in the literary magazines Znamya and Neva.

He played in the films The Head (2003) and Mozart (2006), both directed by Svetlana Baskova.

Mashinsky directed the films The Land of Fly-Agarics (2009) (together with Vladimir Zubkov, Baskova's former film producer) and Fence (2018), in the last of which appeared his daughter, Maria Mashinskaya.

=== Filmography ===
Year	Title	Director	Producer	Screenwriter	Notes
2003	The Head	No	No	No	Actor (the death seller)
2006	Mozart	No	No	No	Actor
2009	The Land of Fly-Agarics	Yes	Yes	Yes	Actor (Hero)
2018	Fence	Yes	Yes	Yes	Actor (Abraxas)

== Personal life ==
Mashinskiy mainly lives in the village of Belogorye, Voronezh Oblast.

== See also ==
- List of actors
- List of film directors
- List of film producers
- List of Russian poets
