= Andrei Volgin =

Andrei Volgin may refer to:

- Andrei Volgin (businessman), Russian businessman
- Andrei Volgin (footballer) (born 1988), Russian footballer
- Andrey Volgin (film director) (born 1981), Russian film director
