= Five Bottles of Vodka =

Five Bottles of Vodka Пять бутылок водки
- Russian release poster
- Directed by: Svetlana Baskova
- Written by: Svetlana Baskova
- Produced by: Svetlana Baskova; Vladimir Zubkov
- Starring: Sergey Pakhomov; Alexander Maslaev; Vladimir Epifantsev
- Distributed by: Independent
- Release date: 2001
- Running time: 90 minutes
- Country: Russia
- Language: Russian

Five Bottles of Vodka (Russian: Пять бутылок водки, romanized: Pyat butylok vodki) is a 2001 Russian black comedy film written and directed by Svetlana Baskova.

== Plot ==
The events of the film take place in an ordinary Moscow bar. The owner of the bar is a drug addict and alcoholic Alexander Alexandrovich (Sanych), who gets drunk at work until he vomits. Two cleaners live in the back room. The cleaner Mychalkin is possibly intellectually disabled, as he does not speak and communicates with inarticulate mooing. The other cleaner, performed by Sergey Pakhomov, is much smarter. The only other employee is a skilled bartender who has no speaking role in the film.

The plot begins with Mychalkin stealing 5 bottles of vodka from the bar and bringing them to the first cleaner. Sanych is very worried about the loss and is trying to identify the thief, suspecting both cleaners of stealing. The first cleaner forces Mychalkin to drink the vodka, much to his dismay, and rants about Sanych and people who have money. He then breaks one bottle over his own head, and throws the rest onto the floor. He sings Mychalkin The Beatles' song "Yesterday".

Sanych constantly exploits the two cleaners, and forces them to work all the time. He bullies and harasses Mychalkin, who can't defend himself. The other cleaner jumps to Mychalkin's defense, and swears that one day he will deal with Sanych.

Later, the cleaner brings Mychalkin into a storage closet and drowns him in a bucket of water to relieve him of his suffering. He cradles Mychalkin's body and confesses that he was his only friend. Sanych enters the closet with an umbrella and demands them to clean it. The cleaner tells Sanych that Mychalkin stole the vodka, leaving Sanych satisfied. The cleaner sings church songs and locks Mychalkin's body in the closet.

The next day, a gangster cooperating with Sanych comes and makes a strange order: on the first day he wants to have sex with a virgin girl, on the second day he wants to have sex with a virgin man, and on the third day he wants to die. if Sanych does not fulfill the order, the gangster will kill him.

Sanych brings the gangster the bartendress in a wedding dress. The gangster has sex with her on the table, and sees that it was her time of month, and then strangles her, all while the cleaner masturbates in the background. Later, the cleaner places her corpse next to Mychalkin's, and lights candles next to them while singing church songs.

The next day, Sanych dresses the cleaner in a wedding dress and brings him to the gangster as a virgin man. The gangster has sex with him, after which Sanych locks the cleaner in the basement.

The next day, the gangster sings the song "Break my heart for luck" in karaoke, then Sanych strangles him with a microphone cord. Sanych gets drunk with alcohol and starts to puke, and then falls asleep.

== Awards and criticism ==
Five Bottles of Vodka was awarded the Youth Jury Award of the Kinoshock Film Festival. This film and The Green Elephant made Baskova a cult art-house director.

As noted by the magazine Iskusstvo Kino, Five Bottles of Vodka is "a cruel film dedicated to the degradation of humanity".
