= Boryana =

Boryana may refer to:

- Boryana Glacier, glacier on Nordenskjöld Coast in Graham Land, Antarctica
- Boryana Rossa (born 1972), Bulgarian interdisciplinary artist
- Boryana Kaleyn (born 2000), Bulgarian individual rhythmic gymnast

== See also ==
- Boriana Stoyanova (born 1969), Bulgarian artistic gymnast
