= Bodybuilder (film) =

- Directed by: Andrey Grachyov
- Written by: Andrey Grachyov
- Produced by: Mariya Pankratova
- Starring: Denis Semenikhin; Mikhail Gorevoy; Vladimir Epifantsev; Viktoriya Poltorak; Darya Poverennova; Sergey Chonishvili; Dmitry Shevchenko; Maksim Linnikov
- Cinematography: Denis Negrivetsky; Sergey Spiridonov
- Release date: April 7, 2022 (Russia)
- Country: Russia
- Language: Russian

Bodybuilder (Russian: Бодибилдер) is a 2022 Russian thriller sports film directed by Andrey Grachyov. It is scheduled to be theatrically released on April 7, 2022.

== Plot ==
Max Meyer is a bodybuilder who once dreamed of becoming the world champion. Due to health issues, however, he is forced to retire early, and his life begins to fall apart. By chance, he meets Victor, an emergency doctor who previously developed a unique drug for the Ministry of Defense. This drug has the potential not only to treat the most severe illnesses but also to enhance all of the body's capabilities. Although the project was eventually shelved, Victor now wants to complete the experiment and needs a test subject. Max turns out to be the perfect candidate for this trial.

== Cast ==
- Denis Semenikhin as Max Mayer
- Mikhail Gorevoy as Viktor
- Vladimir Epifantsev as Den
- Viktoriya Poltorak as Lika
- Darya Poverennova
- Sergey Chonishvili
- Dmitry Shevchenko
- Maksim Linnikov as Alex
