= The Head (2003 film) =

The Head Голова
- Directed by: Svetlana Baskova
- Written by: Svetlana Baskova; Sergey Pakhomov
- Produced by: Pavel Labazov; Vladimir Zubkov
- Starring: Sergey Pakhomov; Alexander Maslaev; Anatoly Osmolovsky; Leonid Mashinskiy
- Distributed by: Independent
- Release date: 2003
- Running time: 90 minutes
- Country: Russia
- Language: Russian

The Head (Russian: Голова) is a 2003 Russian black comedy directed by Svetlana Baskova.

== Plot ==
A gangster performed by Sergey Pakhomov buys a magic Head. The Head fulfills all the wishes of the owner, gives him useful advice and spits money, having previously given him a blowjob. Following the advice of the Head, the gangster makes lucrative deals and exposes conspiracies against himself.

Throughout the film, the gangster tries to find a purpose in his life, constantly consulting with the Head, which secretly hates its owner. At the end of the film, a gangster kills the Head with a stick and becomes a monk.

== Remake ==
A remake of the film with the participation of the writer Arkady Davidowitz was planned, but it was canceled due to his death.

== Awards ==
- International Film Festival Rotterdam, Best Film 2004
- XIII Open Film Festival of the CIS and Baltic States, Kinoshock: "Cinema without film" contest, 2004
- Festival "Deboshir", St. Petersburg, 2004
