= Vladimir Epifantsev =

Russian actor, filmmaker, television presenter

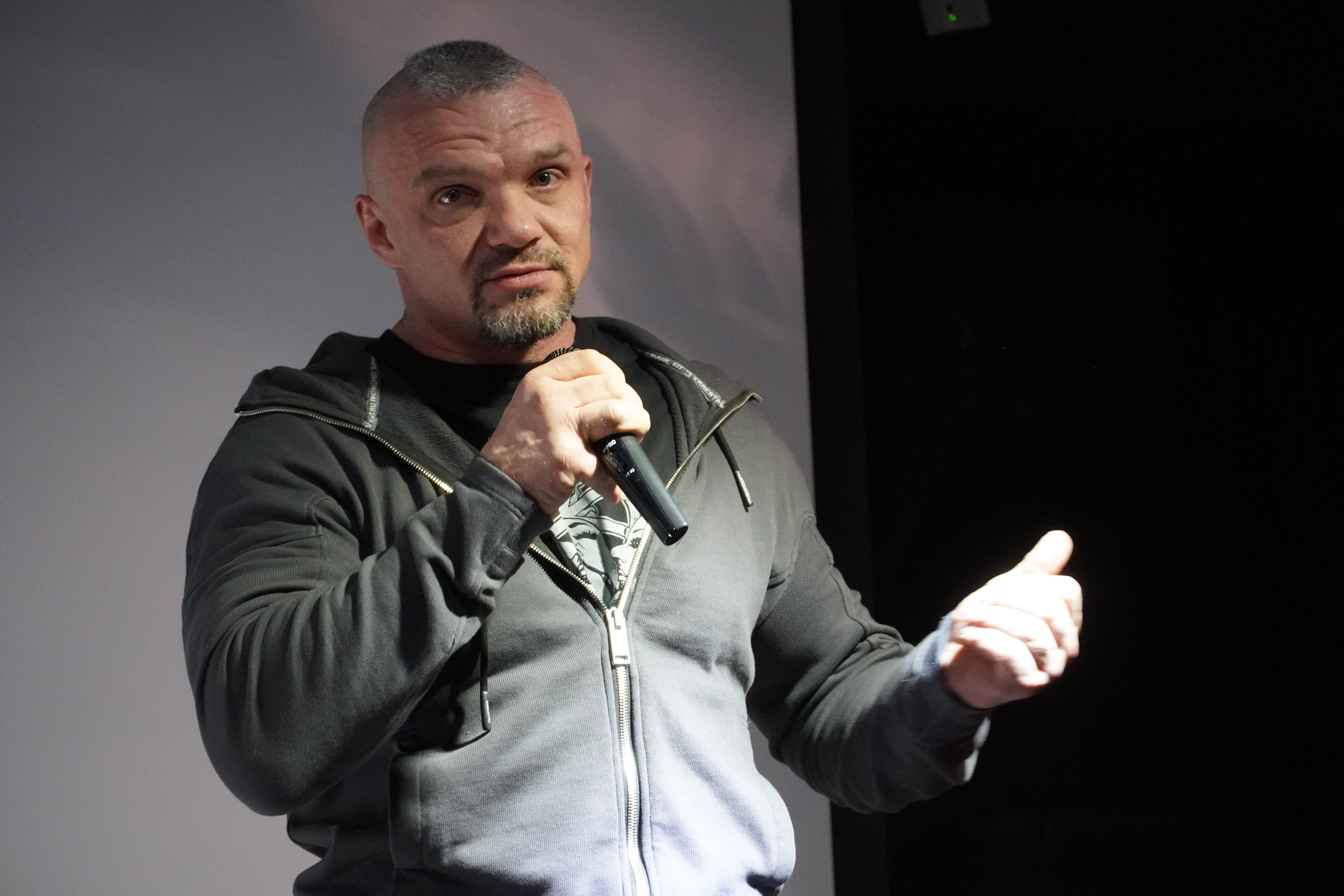
- Born: Vladimir Georgievich Epifantsev; 8 September 1971 (age 54); Moscow, RSFSR, USSR
- Education: Boris Shchukin Theatre Institute
- Occupations: Actor, director
- Years active: 1997–present
- Spouse: Anastasiya Vedenskaya
- Children: 2

Vladimir Georgievich Epifantsev (Russian: Владимир Георгиевич Епифанцев; born 8 September 1971, Moscow, USSR) is a Russian theatre and cinema actor, filmmaker, television presenter and music video director.

== Biography ==
Epifantsev graduated from the acting faculty of the Boris Shchukin Theatre Institute (1994, course of Vladimir Ivanov), studied at GITIS in the directing Department. Then he created a theatrical project Good theatre. In 1997-1998 he created and led the production of the television program the Sandman on the channel of TV-6. Later, he participated in the Cultivator and Muzoboz.

In 1998-1999, he starred in the infamous movie The Green Elephant, which was his first experience in cinema. Subsequently, he has twice played in the movies by directed by Svetlana Baskova, Five Bottles of Vodka (2001) and For Marx (2012).

In 2007, he participated in the TV show King of the Ring under the moniker Stream of Blood (the title of one of his theatrical performances) against Alexey Chumakov.

In 2009, he appeared in Dancing with the Stars: The 2009 Season on the channel Russia-1 in a pair with Anastasia Novozhilova.

In 2012, he starred in the TV crime drama, Kremen ("Flint"), in which he acts as Andrey Shamanov, a GRU major who attempts to fight terrorists.

In 2012, along with his wife Anastasiya Vedenskaya, Epifantsev took part in the TV show Polyglot on the channel Culture.

In 2016, he starred in the video The Smell of Men by group 2rbina 2rista.

On 5 January 2017, he announced the continuation of the film Green Elephant called Operation ZS.

== Selected filmography ==
- 1999 — The Green Elephant
- 2002 — Five Bottles of Vodka
- 2008 — Man of East
- 2011 — Generation P
- 2011 — Home
- 2012 — Spy
- 2012 — For Marx
- 2016 — Dance to Death
- 2016 — 8 Best Dates
- 2021 — Captain Volkonogov Escaped
- 2022 — Bodybuilder
