= The Return of Vasili Bortnikov =

1953 film by Vsevolod Pudovkin

- Directed by: Vsevolod Pudovkin
- Written by: Yevgeni Gabrilovich; Galina Nikolayeva (novel)
- Starring: Sergei Lukyanov
- Cinematography: Sergei Urusevsky
- Music by: Kirill Molchanov
- Production company: Mosfilm
- Release date: 1953
- Running time: 108 minutes (2,966 meters)
- Country: Soviet Union
- Language: Russian

The Return of Vasili Bortnikov (Russian: Возвращение Василия Бортникова, Vozvrashshyeniye Vasiliya Bortnikova) is a 1953 Soviet drama film directed by Vsevolod Pudovkin based on the novel The Harvest by Galina Nikolayeva.

== Plot ==
After suffering a concussion and spending several years in a hospital, Vasily returns to his collective farm, where he had previously served as chairman. Believing him to be dead, his wife mourned his loss but eventually found solace and justification in the sincere love of a mechanic from the machine and tractor station, whom she brought into their home as her new husband. Vasily's return proves challenging for everyone. Re-elected as chairman, he dedicates himself entirely to his work, and eventually, he also finds his way back to his family.

== Cast ==
- Sergei Lukyanov - Vasili Bortnikov
- Natalya Medvedeva - Avdotya
- Nikolai Timofeyev - Stephan
- Anatoli Chemodurov - Chekanov
- Inna Makarova - Frosya
- Anatoli Ignatyev - Pavel
- Vsevolod Sanayev - Kentaurov
- Klara Luchko - Natalya
- Galina Stepanova
- Nonna Mordyukova
- Mariya Yarotskaya
- Andrei Petrov
- Danuta Stolyarskaya
