= Dance to Death =

- Directed by: Andrei Volgin
- Written by: Andrei Zolotaryov
- Produced by: Viktor Denisyuk; Evgeniy Melentiev; Aleksandr Kurinsky
- Starring: Ivan Zhvakin; Lukeria Ilyaschenko
- Cinematography: Vyacheslav Linsnevsky
- Production company: Kinodanz
- Release date: April 6, 2017
- Running time: 97 minutes
- Country: Russia
- Language: Russian
- Budget: $1.7 million
- Box office: $183 500

Dance to Death (Russian: Танцы насмерть, romanized: Tantsy nasmert) is a 2017 Russian science fiction film directed by Andrei Volgin.

== Plot ==
The film takes place in 2070 when the world plunges into ruins as a result of nuclear war. The ability of people to survive depends on the energy emitted by the participants in the brutal dance tournament. But this system becomes endangered when one of the applicants falls in love with one of the contestants and decides to save her life.

== Cast ==
- Ivan Zhvakin as Kostya
- Lukerya Ilyashenko as Anya
- Nikita Volkov as Artyom
- Alexander Tyutin as manager
- Agniya Ditkovskite as Zebra
- Denis Shvedov as Gray
- Vladimir Epifantsev as tournament manager

== Production ==
Shooting took place in the Moscow City area, in the business center of the Dominion Tower, in the building of the Presidium of the Russian Academy of Sciences and in the old buildings of Electrozavod.
