= 14+ (film) =

2015 Russian film

- Theatrical release poster
- Directed by: Andrey Zaytsev
- Screenplay by: Andrey Zaytsev
- Produced by: Andrey Zaytsev; Olga Granina
- Starring: Gleb Kalyuzhny; Ulyana Vaskovich
- Cinematography: Shandor Berkeshi; Kirill Bobrov
- Production company: Cinema Foundation of Russia
- Distributed by: Central Partnership
- Release dates: 7 February 2015 (Berlin); 8 June 2015 (Russia)
- Running time: 106 minutes
- Country: Russia
- Language: Russian

14+ is a 2015 Russian coming-of-age romantic film produced by the Cinema Foundation of Russia. It was first shown at the 2015 Berlin International Film Festival. It is about a teenage boy feeling infatuation for the first time. A sequel was released in 2023: 14+: Continued.

== Cast ==
- Gleb Kalyuzhny as Lyosha
- Ulyana Vaskovich as Vika
- Olga Ozollapinya as Lyosha's mother
- Dmitry Barinov as Dron
- Kseniya Pakhomova as Rusalka
- Daniil Pikula as Vityok
- Elizaveta Makedonskaya as Katya
- Aleksey Filimonov as Volkov
