= For Marx (film) =

For Marx…
- Directed by: Svetlana Baskova
- Written by: Svetlana Baskova
- Produced by: Andrey Silvestrov; Gleb Aleynikov
- Starring: Sergey Pakhomov; Vladimir Epifantsev; Viktor Sergachyov
- Cinematography: Maxim Mosin
- Production company: Cine Phantom
- Release date: 2012
- Running time: 100 minutes
- Country: Russia
- Language: Russian

For Marx (Russian: За Маркса…) is a 2012 Russian drama film directed by Svetlana Baskova.

== Plot ==
The film depicts the situation at a steel plant during the economic crisis. Set in 2010, the plant's owner Pavel Sergeyevich implements wage cuts and layoffs, provoking unrest among the workers. A group of activists forms an independent trade union to push management to resolve various issues. The story revolves around the conflict between the workers and the management.

== Cast ==
- Sergey Pakhomov as the foreman of the foundry, union activist
- Alexander Kovalyov as the master of the foundry, union activist
- Lavrentiy Svetlichny as a union activist
- Vladimir Epifantsev as Pavel Sergeyevich, the plant owner
- Viktor Sergachyov as Sergey Viktorovich, the owner's father
- Denis Yakovlev as Dodik, assistant to the owner
- Vladimir Yakovlev as Deputy Minister
- Mikhail Kalinkin as Shop Manager
- Viktor Yurkov as Young Worker

== Awards and nominations ==
The film was screened at the Berlin International Film Festival in 2013. It won the "Event of the Year" award at the "White Elephant" festival and was nominated for the main prize at Kinotavr in 2012.

It also received a Nika Award nomination for Best Supporting Actor for Vladimir Epifantsev.
