= The Green Elephant =

1999 Russian exploitation experimental film

The Green Elephant Зелёный слоник
- Russian release poster
- Directed by: Svetlana Baskova
- Written by: Svetlana Baskova
- Produced by: Oleg Mavromati; Svetlana Baskova; Vladimir Zubkov
- Starring: Sergey Pakhomov; Alexander Maslaev; Vladimir Epifantsev; Anatoly Osmolovsky; Oleg Mavromati
- Cinematography: Svetlana Baskova; Oleg Mavromati
- Edited by: Supernova Studio; Oleg Mavromati
- Music by: Stanislav Zapalikov; Pantera
- Production company: Supernova
- Distributed by: Independent
- Release date: 1999
- Running time: 86 minutes
- Country: Russia
- Language: Russian

The Green Elephant (Russian: Зелёный слоник, romanized: Zelyonyy slonik, also known as Green Elephant Calf) is a 1999 Russian exploitation arthouse horror film directed by Svetlana Baskova. The movie received a limited theatrical release in Russia, as the film's violent imagery and graphic language made it unfit for being distributed through the mainstream film circuit. The film was shown at the 2005 International Film Festival Rotterdam, and the program commented that the movie was "even more urgent because of the escalation of the war in Chechnya and growing criminality in the Russian army".

The film stars Sergey Pakhomov and Vladimir Epifantsev, and follows two Russian officers locked in a military prison cell that must deal with "social and psychological problems" in their isolation through brutality and torture.

== Plot ==
Although the exact date is never mentioned in the movie itself, it is implied that the story takes place in 1986. Two unnamed junior officers in the Soviet Army, played by Epifantsev and Pakhomov (nicknamed "Bratishka" ("Bro") and "Poyekhavshiy" ("Nutcase") respectively by some fans of the film), arrive to a penal military prison. Their shared cell is a tiny, scarcely lit room with a leaking sewer pipe running through it. The walls are painted a toxic green colour. Pakhomov is extremely talkative and seemingly delirious, possibly from excessive alcohol consumption, although also friendly and good-natured. Epifantsev is initially amused by his stories and behaviour, but then starts to become progressively more and more annoyed by him, until finally lashing out and beating him up. Epifantsev is then taken away by the guard (Maslaev) to clean the toilet with a fork as punishment.

Later, when the exhausted Epifantsev is brought back to the cell and has fallen asleep, Pakhomov defecates on their shared plate, smears himself in feces, and consumes some of it. He then wakes Epifantsev up, and offers him the plate, which disgusts and aggravates him again. While Epifantsev is yelling death threats at him, Pakhomov says that he got them something to eat because he feared that they will not be fed there. Maslaev comes to the shouting, and takes Epifantsev to clean the toilet once more, while seemingly completely ignoring Pakhomov. The captain (Osmolovsky) arrives to the cell, and teaches the suddenly quiet Pakhomov about the Asiatic-Pacific Theater, particularly the names and quantities of Japanese and American ships on Pearl Harbor. He then asks Pakhomov question about it, and gets angry at him for answering incorrectly. Meanwhile, Maslaev brings him tea, which Osmolovsky says "tastes like piss", after trying it. He then pours the tea on Maslaev's head, and orders him to go back to the canteen while holding the glass with his teeth. When he comes back, the captain allows him to beat Pakhomov up.

Epifantsev and Pakhomov are then sent to the basement, where they are subjected to various humiliating acts by the captain, while the guard watches. Osmolovsky suddenly turns to Maslaev, and asks him why is he standing there, since he will be executed in an hour as well. The guard doesn't realize that the captain isn't being serious, and wets himself out of fear, after which the captain whips him to make him dance, while Epifantsev and Pakhomov sing "Yablochko". Epifantsev struggles to get out of the hole in the basement's floor, screaming and ranting of his sanity, and orders Pakhomov to catch a rat for him to eat. The captain returns, and asks them questions about the Northern Formation. Taunting Epifantsev's requests for food, the captain forces him to oral sex, to which he begs that Pakhomov receives it instead. The captain then subjects him to oral sex, muttering the names of the Japanese carrier ships at Pearl Harbor. Driven to insanity and reaching a breaking point, Epifantsev attacks the captain using a pipe and bites off his face, before sodomizing him and tearing off his trachea. He then makes Pakhomov blow it, pretending like it is an elephant's trunk.

Upon realizing that he has murdered a human, Epifantsev commits suicide. Pakhomov mourns him, muttering about his experiences with his mother. Some time later, Maslaev comes to the bloodied basement, proclaiming himself a colonel, and asks Pakhomov to accompany him to some celebration. He then gets on a chair and puts a rope around his neck, and Pakhomov knocks the chair over. Pakhomov plays with the corpse for a while, singing about the "Green Elephant", before falling asleep among the dead bodies.

There are also several black-and-white scenes showing the guard walking the hallways, drinking and eating his meal, and complaining about the prisoner's behavior affecting the prestige of the military. During the credits, the guard is shown screaming "I am a colonel" and "I will be a colonel".

== Cast ==
- Sergey Pakhomov (actor) as the first junior officer.
- Vladimir Epifantsev as the second junior officer.
- Alexander Maslaev as the guard.
- Anatoly Osmolovsky as the captain.
- Oleg Mavromati as the captain's voice in the opening scene.

== Production ==
The movie was filmed during the summer of 1999 at several different locations. One of them was the basement in the house that belonged to the photographer Sergei Rodkevich, located near the Kurskaya metro station. Another site was the basement of an abandoned factory building in Moscow's Faleevsky Lane, which was called the "Factory of Cardinal Art" (the building at Sofiyskaya Embankment, 26/1, which currently is the headquarters of Rosneft). The last room was discovered by musicians Alexei Tegin and Svyatoslav Ponomarev. who were later joined by Vladimir Epifantsev, who occupied the right side of the Factory, and built the Prok-Theater there, in the basement of which the shooting took place. On the territory of the "Factory", they found overcoats in which the characters of the film put on, and a plate used as props. Some of the costumes were provided by Alexander Malyshev. The "Corridor" scenes, with the participation of the character Alexander Maslaev, were in the underpass of one of the Moscow metro stations. No investments were required for the arrangement of the film set. According to Sergei Pakhomov, the film could have been made "only in that cheap style". Oleg Mavromati, the film's producer, admitted in an interview that he used "something like brainwashing in a sect" to convince the actors to "play the right way". According to him, “people did not want to risk their lives and health, or reputation, and one had to be cunning ... Setting a personal example also worked. If someone did not want, for example, to drink blood, then I did it first”. The task of Svetlana Baskova as a director, according to Pakhomov, "was to correct improvisational flows" due to the very high degree of improvisation in the film, and the film itself "dictated the production process". The actors did not rehearse - according to Alexei Tegin, "being in this basement, such dialogues are natural ... there was total improvisation, which is good". The blood used in the last scenes was brought from a real slaughterhouse. “Real blood from the slaughterhouse, real feces” said Mavromati, who also said that Maslaev actually hung himself and was barely brought back to life. To imitate feces, the “Slivochnoye Poleno” dessert was used.

The film was shot on an amateur (S-VHS, DV-cam) video camera. According to one version, the name of the film is taken from the song of the same name by Pakhomov, written specifically for the film, however, Mavromati claims that the title of the film came from another film, Pink Flamingos, under the influence of which The Green Elephant was partly filmed. In the Cult of Cinema program on the Russia-K TV channel, Baskova noted that the film, in a certain sense, was conceived as a protest against the Chechen War.

== Reception ==
HorrorNews.net wrote an overall favorable review for the film, stating "By the end, we find ourselves asking a lot of questions; of ourselves, of the director, of our television screens. What did we just watch? Why did these people do what we just watched them do? What does it all mean? I can't answer those questions, but I can tell you that it is an experience that I am happy to have gone through, and I'd definitely be interested in checking out more of Svetlana Baskova's movies."

This film is banned for distribution in Russia and Belarus due to the film's graphic nature. According to the court of St. Petersburg, it contains "information that can cause children to feel fear, horror or panic", and "provoke obsessive flashbacks or feelings".

Actor Sergey Pakhomov said on the topic:

This film is a force of nature. The force of nature was denied, it was banned. The sky was banned, grass was banned, sleep was banned. You could say that children were banned. This movie is very important for children, because it shows how scary the future is. There is a fixation on certain elements like feces, urine, pain, joy. The movie is, of course, about that. These are absolutely children's symptoms.

== Legacy ==
The Green Elephant has gradually gained a cult following since 2010, in which quotes from the movie were used for trolling multiplayer servers. It has also become the subject of various fan-made music videos and YouTube poops, mocking the characters' bizarre behaviours.

=== Remake ===
On January 5, 2017, Vladimir Epifantsev posted on his Instagram account that he has started working on a remake of the film, known as Operation GE («Операция ZS»), in which he and Sergey Pakhomov will reprise their roles.

As of 2022, there have been no further news regarding the potential remake.
