= Duel (1944 film) =

- Russian: Поединок
- Directed by: Vladimir Legoshin
- Written by: Lev Sheynin; Leonid Tur; Pyotr Tur
- Starring: Sergei Lukyanov; Vladimir Belokurov; Andrey Tutyshkin; Nadezhda Borskaya; Nina Alisova
- Cinematography: Sergey Urusevskiy
- Music by: Klimenti Korchmaryov
- Release date: 1944
- Country: Soviet Union
- Language: Russian

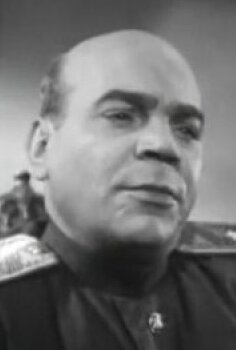
Actor Alexey Gribov in film Duel

Duel (Russian: Поединок) is a 1944 Soviet crime drama film directed by Vladimir Legoshin.

== Cast ==
The film takes place during the Great Patriotic War. The Red Army receives a new gun: "L-2", which was invented by the engineer Leontiev. He also has to test weapons on the front. German intelligence wants to acquire these weapons at any cost.

== Starring ==
- Sergei Lukyanov as Secret Service Col. Lartsev
- Vladimir Belokurov as Peter Weininger, aka Petrov, aka Petronescu
- Andrey Tutyshkin as The Captive Boris Leontyev
- Nadezhda Borskaya as Mariya Zubova (as Natasha Borskaya)
- Nina Alisova as Natalya Osenina
- Nadir Malishevsky as Capt. Bakhmetyev
- Aleksey Gribov as The Commissar of the Secret Service
- Omar Abdulov as Gestapo Col. Kraschke
- Anna Zarzhitskaya as Tonya, spy
- Irina Mesnonkina as Irina, spy
