= Sergei Lukyanov =

Soviet actor

- Born: Sergei Vladimirovich Lukyanov; September 27, 1910; Nyzhnie, Slavyanoserbsk uezd, Yekaterinoslav Governorate, Russian Empire
- Died: March 1, 1965 (aged 54); Moscow, Soviet Union
- Occupation: Actor
- Years active: 1925–1965

Sergei Vladimirovich Lukyanov (Russian: Сергей Владимирович Лукья́нов; 27 September 1910 — 1 March 1965) was a Soviet stage and film actor. He was a People's Artist of the RSFSR (1952) and the winner of two Stalin Prizes of the second degree (1951, 1952).

== Biography ==
Sergei Lukyanov was born in the village of Nyzhnie, in a miner's family. He went to school, then graduated from the Mining College and began working at the mine. He engaged in the circle of theatrical performances. In 1929, after one of the performances, Lukyanov offered to try his hand on the professional stage and he was invited to the Donbas Theater.

== Family ==
- First wife — Nadezhda Tyshkevich
  - Daughter — Tatyana Lukyanova, theater actress
    - Granddaughter — Darya Poverennova
- Second wife — Klara Luchko
  - Daughter — Oksana Lukyanova
    - Grandson — Aleksandr

== Filmography ==
- 1944: Outright as investigator Lartsev
- 1945: Duel as Secret Service Col. Lartsev
- 1948: Boy from the Outskirts as Andrey's father
- 1950: Cossacks of the Kuban as Cossack Gordei Gordeyich Voron
- 1951: The Unforgettable Year 1919 as General Rodzyanko
- 1953: The Return of Vasili Bortnikov as Vasili Bortnikov
- 1953: Yegor Bulychov and Others as Egor Bulychov
- 1953: Hostile Whirlwinds as Nikanor
- 1953: The Miners of Donetsk as Alexey Fedorovich Kravtsov
- 1954: A Big Family as Matvei Zhurbin
- 1955: Twelfth Night as Antonio
- 1956: The Rumyantsev Case as Sergei Afanasyev, police colonel
- 1958: Oleko Dundich as Skuro
- 1958: The Captain's Daughter as Yemelyan Pugachyov
- 1959: Foma Gordeyev as Ignat Gordeyev
- 1961: Chronicle of Flaming Years as Vasiliy Ryasnyy uchitel
- 1964: Attack and Retreat as commander of the guerrilla unit
