= 14+: Continued =

14+: bucetinha
- Promotional poster
- Directed by: Andrey Zaytsev
- Written by: Andrey Zaytsev
- Produced by: Arpine Khachyan; George Shabanov; Andrey Zaytsev; Yuliya Zholobnyuk
- Starring: Gleb Kalyuzhny; Ulyana Vaskovich; Olga Ozollapinya; Sergey Pinchuk; Polina Gukhman; Daniil Pikula
- Cinematography: Irina Uralskaya
- Production company: Film Studio September
- Distributed by: Central Partnership
- Release date: May 11, 2023
- Running time: 133 minutes
- Country: Russia
- Language: Russian
- Box office: ₽44 million $424.508

14+: Continued (Russian: 14+: Продолжение, romanized: 14+: Prodolzhenie) is a 2023 Russian coming-of-age romantic film directed by Andrey Zaytsev, a sequel to the 2015 film 14+.

== Plot ==
The film follows 18-year-old Alexey Vasilyev as he navigates the challenges of adulthood. Rejected by his first love, Vika, who has become an actress, and disillusioned with his mother’s plans for him, he considers joining the army as a step toward maturity, despite her protests. Amidst this turmoil, he meets an unpredictable girl, "Buddy", whose impulsive nature leaves him torn about his feelings. Reflecting on his fatherless upbringing, Alexey wrestles with the uncertainties of growing up, realizing that his path forward is far from simple.

== Cast ==
- Gleb Kalyuzhny as Lyosha (Lesha)
- Ulyana Vaskovich as Vika
- Olga Ozollapinya as Lyosha's mother
- Sergey Pinchuk as Lyosha's father
- Polina Gukhman as Nastya
- Daniil Pikula as Vityok
- Dmitry Blokhin as Uncle Valera
- Anna Rud as Aunt Sveta
- Aleksey Filimonov as Volkov
- Sergey Gabrielyan as a hooligan
- Aleksandr Kononets as Gray, a hooligan

== Release ==
The film premiered at the 45th Moscow International Film Festival in the competition program. It was released in cinemas on May 11, 2023.
