= Aleksey Filimonov =

Russian actor

- Алексей Филимонов
- Born: Aleksey Vitalyevich Filimonov; 3 February 1981 (age 45); Irkutsk, RSFSR, USSR
- Occupations: Actor, dubbing
- Years active: 2006–present

Aleksey Vitalyevich Filimonov (Russian: Алексе́й Вита́льевич Филимо́нов; born 3 February 1981) is a Russian actor. Winner of the Kinotavr 2014.

== Biography ==
Filimonov was born in Irkutsk, Russian SFSR, Soviet Union. He studied at the Irkutsk Theater School and worked in various theaters in Russia. In 2005 he made his film debut.

== Selected filmography ==
Year	Title	Role	Notes
2009	Oxygen	Sanyok	
2009	Crush	Russian guy	
2012	Living	Anton	
2015	14+	Volkov	
2015	About Love	Grisha	
2019	The Bull	Maus	
2020	A Siege Diary	gravedigger	
2021	Vertinsky	Alexander Vertinsky	
2021	Survivors	Alexander Morozov	
2021	V2. Escape from Hell	Korzh	
2023	14+: Prodolzhenie		
