= Belogorye (selo, Amur Oblast) =

Belogorye Белогорье
- Selo
- Location within Amur Oblast Location within Russia
- Coordinates: 50°29′N 127°39′E
- Country: Russia
- Region: Amur Oblast
- District: Urban okrug Blagoveshchensk
- Time zone: UTC+9:00

Belogorye (Russian: Белого́рье) is a rural locality (a selo) in urban okrug Blagoveshchensk of Amur Oblast, Russia. The population was 2,795 as of 2018. There are 44 streets.

== Geography ==
Belogorye is located near the right bank of the Zeya River, 37 km north of Blagoveshchensk (the district's administrative centre) by road. Prizeyskaya is the nearest rural locality.
