= Red Silk =

- Directed by: Andrey Volgin
- Written by: Maria Nefedova; Ilya Kozhurkhar; Aleksei Kolmogorov
- Produced by: Vadim Smirnov; Anastasia Korchagina; Vadim Byrkin; Gosha Kutsenko; Anastasia Pelevina; Svetlana Zimagorova; Olga Kashiina; Nikita Byrkin; Vyacheslav Chernyavsky; Vasil Shevts; Yang Yang; Liu Хuan
- Starring: Miloš Biković; Gleb Kalyuzhny; Zheng Hanyi; Yelena Podkaminskaya; Gosha Kutsenko; Svetlana Chuikina; Yaroslav Mogilnikov; Zhargal Badmatsyrenov; Irina Alfyorova; Dmitry Kulichkov; Huang Haonan; Yang Zihua; Zheng Long
- Cinematography: Maksim Mikhanyuk
- Edited by: Konstantin Mazur; Andrey Volgin
- Music by: Michael Afanasyev
- Production companies: Nota Bene Film Group; Art Pictures Distribution; Hengdian World Studios; Cinema Fund
- Distributed by: National Media Group Film Distribution; Hengdian World Studios
- Release dates: February 18, 2025 (Karo 11 October); February 20, 2025 (Russia)
- Running time: 146 minutes
- Countries: Russia; China
- Language: Russian
- Budget: ₽785 million
- Box office: ₽643 million

Red Silk is a 2025 Russian-Chinese retro-mystery film directed by Andrey Volgin, the action-packed detective story is based on real historical events. The detective also stars Miloš Biković, Gleb Kalyuzhny, Zheng Hanyi, and Yelena Podkaminskaya, alongside Gosha Kutsenko, Svetlana Chuikina, Yaroslav Mogilnikov, Zhargal Badmatsyrenov, Irina Alfyorova, and Dmitry Kulichkov, with the Chinese side are represented by Huang Haonan, Yang Zihua, and Zheng Long. Principal photography began in February 2024 in the Lake Baikal area.

Red Silk premiered at the Karo 11 October in Moscow on February 18, 2025, and was theatrically released in Russia on February 20, by National Media Group Film Distribution.

The film takes place in 1927 on the Trans-Siberian Railway. Couriers of the Chinese Communist Party are carrying top secret documents across Russia that could determine the future of the Soviet Union and China relations. The couriers, having illegally crossed the Soviet-Chinese border near Blagoveshchensk, board the Trans-Siberian Express "Vladivostok-Moscow" in Belogorsk. But it is on the "best train in the country" that the main danger awaits them - here, under the guise of ordinary passengers, both Kuomintang agents and foreign intelligence officers are hiding. In addition, the train is pursued by Honghuzi - greedy cutthroats hired by someone, ready to do anything for the most valuable documents.

== Plot ==
The film opens in 1927 in Shanghai. Nikolai Garin is a Tsarist agent who has spent the last ten years of his life in foreign countries like France and Mexico and now wishes to return home to Russia by renouncing White movement ideology and becoming a Communist. He meets with KGB agents of the Russian government in Shanghai hoping that by alerting them to an upcoming Kuomintang plan he uncovered to massacre the entire Communist party in Shanghai that they will believe him. Meanwhile, young Chinese girl Wang Lin is travelling to her grandfather's silk factory. The silk factory is the base of operations for the Communists in Shanghai and it's where revolutionary banners are being sewn in the back. Kuomintang barge in and massacre her grandfather and all the revolutionaries though Wang Lin escapes with the help of her friend Li Bao. Back at the meeting place, Anna Vasilievna is seemingly unconvinced Nikolai Garin is telling the truth and orders her men to arrest him though he turns the tables on them and manages to escape in a crowd of people.

=== Chapter 1: travelling companions ===
Wang Lin and Li Bo are now in Manchuria on the border with Russia. They are escorting Teacher Gao, an elderly communist revolutionary with a list of the names of all red agents operating within China. The Honghuzi bandits who operate along the border know that they are coming and launch an attack, killing one bodyguard who was travelling with the three. Meanwhile, in Belogorsk Anna Vasilievna is working as a KGB operative when she is informed that the Honghuzi have also killed a group she had sent to the Chinese emissaries to escort them safely in to Russia. On the Russian side, the Honghuzi killed everyone except the professional soldier and KGB man, Fyodor Kornilov. Anna explains to a fellow KGB man working with them that it's absolutely important that they find the Chinese couriers and deliver the names on their list safely to Moscow because otherwise it could fall into the hands of a "Much worse enemy that would make the 'Honghuzi' look like a faint wind on the edge of a forest."

Artyom Svetlov is a young Chekist officer travelling to a border outpost near China where the Soviet man stationed at the outpost has destroyed the telegraph wires and sold them for their copper to the Honghuzi in exchange for alcohol from China. The man warns Artyom to not interfere with their matters because in that remote region, the Honghuzi are in charge not the communists. Meanwhile, the Chinese emissaries are escaping the Honghuzi attack when Nikolai Garin appears hiding in the snow with a Maxim machine gun and scares away the bandits. He had traveled to the border and was waiting for the emissaries to use them as leverage to get back inside of Russia. The four of them travel to the outpost where Svetlov is. The station master runs away thinking the band are Honghuzi though Svetlov stays and arrests them though they escape.

Svetlov who was left in the snow arrives hours later in Belogorsk where Anna Vasilievna has arrested Garin and apprehended the Chinese couriers. Anna is impressed Svetlov had found the couriers and says he can travel with them as a bodyguard to Moscow but first he must send Garin to prison. Garin is escorted to prison by Svetlov who then goes to the train where the Chinese delegates are to help them get prepared for the journey. While Svetlov is meeting Wang Lin and showing her the compartment she will ride in, Garin escapes by yanking a water pipe out of the wall and pretending he is injured to the guard, who rushes in and then is immediately locked in the cell. Garin rushes to the train which is now leaving as Anna, Kornilov, the Chinese emissaries and the rest of the passengers take their seats.

== Cast ==
- Miloš Biković as Nikolai Garin, a Tsarist officer and former secret agent
- Gleb Kalyuzhny as Artyom Svetlov, a young Red Army soldier and translator, an employee of the Joint State Political Directorate
- Zheng Hanyi as Wang Ling, a Chinese intelligence courier and translator, an agent for the Chinese Communist Party
- Yelena Podkaminskaya as Anna Volkova, an employee of the Soviet foreign intelligence officer
- Gosha Kutsenko as Fyodor Kornilov, a Red commander
- Svetlana Chuikina as Grom, a female train conductor
- Yaroslav Mogilnikov as Petya, a young waiter and buffet attendant in the dining car
- Zhargal Badmatsyrenov as Ayanov, was an agrochemist and specialist in pesticides, a train passenger
- Irina Alfyorova as Countess Demidova, a train passenger
- Dmitry Kulichkov as Sviblov, a photographer and architect, a train passenger
- Huang Haonan as Li Bo, a Chinese underground fighter, Wang Ling's childhood friend
- Yang Zihua as "Teacher Gao"
- Zheng Long as Du Xin
- Qu Gang as Wang Ling's father
- Yue Chunyu as a Kuomintang officer
- Yevgeny Sidikhin as Berezin, head of the State Political Directorate
- Samvel Muzhikyan as Oganov, a representative of the State Political Directorate
- Vasily Borisov as a chief hunghuz
- Vadim Badmatsyrenov as a hunghuz machinist
- Konstantin Milovanov as Vasil, a guard

== Production ==
=== Development ===
According to the director, Red Silk will attract the attention of a wide audience, because everyone will find something for themselves in the story. The audience will see twisted riddles, vivid battle scenes, chase episodes (there will be plenty of action and adventure on the screen), a recreation of the past era and, of course, a love story. Many viewers will also be attracted by the fact that the action takes place in a confined space, which will add a special atmosphere to the film and will fit it into the ranks of some of the most popular films of this genre, such as Murder on the Orient Express (2017 film).

The film is not historical, but it has a real basis: in 1928, the 6th National Congress of the Chinese Communist Party was unexpectedly held for the whole world took place in the Moscow region (Moscow), to participate in the congress, the delegates traveled along the Trans-Siberian Railway across Russia with great risk to their lives. They were hunted by both Kuomintang agents and employees of several foreign intelligence services. But the Chinese comrades were accompanied by Comintern members, among whom was the young translator Artyom Svetlov.

=== Casting ===
For the performer of the role of Wang Lin, the Chinese Zheng Hanyi, this is her debut in cinema, the creators of the film found her after a long casting at the theater institute in St. Petersburg, where she entered four years ago, and managed to learn Russian well.

=== Filming ===
Principal photography took place on Lake Baikal in the Irkutsk region, in the Pskov and Leningrad regions, and also in Saint Petersburg.

In China, filming was carried out at Hengdian World Studios, the film is a joint Russian-Chinese film project: a co-production partnership was concluded between the Russian Nota Bene Film Group and the Chinese Fen Dou Mao Film & TV Culture Media (Beijing) Co. and Tianjin Co-Production Film & TV Co7, the Chinese side invested in the production funds in exchange for part of the rights to the film, which will allow it to be distributed in China as locally produced products, without taking into account quotas for foreign films.

== Release ==
Red Silk was theatrically released in the Russian Federation on February 20, 2025, by National Media Group Film Distribution.

=== Marketing ===
The film was made with the support of the Cinema Fund. In January 2025, the head of the Russian Ministry of Culture Olga Lyubimova, during a meeting of Russian President Vladimir Putin with members of the government, made a statement that the film Red Silk is one of the most anticipated films to be released in 2025.
