= Oleg Mavromati =

Russian artist-actionist and a filmmaker (born 1965)

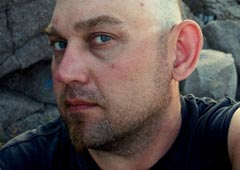
- Oleg Mavromati, 2009
- Born: Oleg Yurevich Mavromati; February 5, 1965 (age 61); Volgograd, Russian SFSR, Soviet Union
- Known for: artist, activist, filmmaker
- Movement: Volgograd Medical School (graduated 1984)

Oleg Yurevich Mavromati (also known as Mavromatti; born February 5, 1965, Volgograd) is a Russian artist, activist, and filmmaker.

== Biography ==
Mavromatti was born on February, 5th 1965 in Volgograd, USSR.

In 1984, he graduated from the Volgograd medical school № 3. From 1985 to 1989, he was a leader of the art collective The Dance of the Giraffe («Танец жирафа»). From 1987 to 1990, he was an editor of the punk journal No Future («Будущего нет»). From 1988 to 1990, he was a front-man of the punk bands Schnook («ЧМО») and Manifesto Committee («Комитет Манифест»). Between 1990 and 1991, he took part in the art movement Expropriation of the Territory of Art («ЭТИ») together with Anatoly Osmolovsky, Dmitry Pimenov, and Grigori Gusarov. From 1993 to 1994, he participated in the art collective Neceziudik («Нецезиудик») together with Alexander Brener, Anatoly Osmolovsky, Dmitry Pimenov, Sendi Revizorov, and Alexander Zubarzuk. In 1995, together with the artists Farid Bogdalov, Mavromatti established the art collective Absolute Love Sect. The members of said art collective included Imperator Wawa, Dmitry Pimenov, Mihail and Tatyana Nikitin, Alena Martynova.

The Film Union SUPERNOVA, through which Mavromatti has been producing his films, was established by him and Sergej Salnikov in 1995. Until 2000, other individuals involved in the production company were Sergej Pahomov, Svetlana Baskova, Alexander Maslaev and others. Since 2000, SUPERNOVA productions films have been made in Bulgaria and the United States. He has collaborated with artist Boryana Rossa in his films.

In 2004, Oleg Mavrmatti and Boryana Rossa established ULTRAFUTURO art collective. Other members are Anton Terziev, Katia Damianova and Miroslav Dimitrov. The group had made more than 60 performances and public demonstrations. The collective was formed to address issues such as the rise in technology, modern science, and their social and political implications. Works by ULTRAFUTURO were shown at venues such as the Biennial for Electronic Art, Perth (BEAP); Society for Art and Technology (SAT), Montreal; Art Digital at the 2nd Moscow Biennial; Center for Biotechnology and Interdisciplinary Studies, Rensselaer Polytechnic Institute, Troy, NY; MUMOK, Viena; Zacheta Gallery, Warsaw; RIAP Performance art festival Quebec, Stedelijk Museum, Amsterdam; and at Schenectady Museum, NY. They are included in the renowned selection of Transitland Video Art across Central and Eastern Europe between 1989 and 2009. Rossa and Mavromatti performed as ULTRAFUTURO in Trickster Theatre, Exit Art, NY starting in 2006.

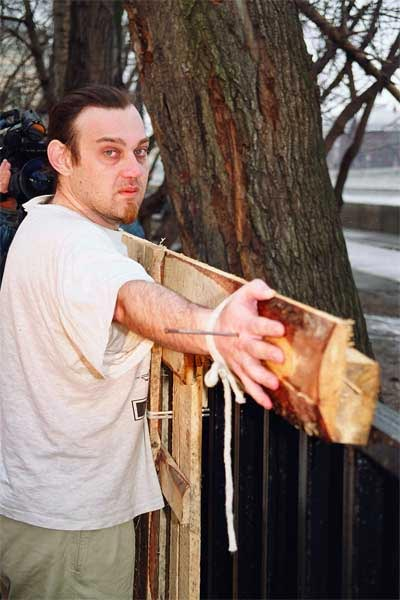
Oleg Mavromati, performance Do Not Believe Your Eyes!

On April 1, 2000 at the yard of the Institute of Cultorology in Moscow, Mavromatti shoot a scene of his film Oil on Canvas. He was a director and an actor in one of the leading roles. The script involved a scene of crucifixion, which later appeared to be controversial for particular fundamentalist formations in the Orthodox Church in Russia.

The plot of the film is based upon the biography of the young Ukrainian painter Oleg Golosiy, who according to the legend was killed by his best friend. This friend was also an artist, and he committed this crime because of envy. Mavromatti developed the story and added another psychological layer of the character who killed Golosiy. Mavromatti himself played the role of the killer. According to the script the character repented and in order to prove his sincerity he chose to change the traditional artistic medium he used (paint and canvas) with direct action and physical expression. As a true expression of his repentance the character decided to crucify himself, representing an archetype of sacrifice, pain and humiliation. The place where the scene was shot was strategically chosen to be in between the Institute of Cultorology and the temple Christ the Savior. The performance within the film was called Do Not Believe Your Eyes and was also meant to address the institutionalization of artistic expression, the commercialization of art, and the compromise artists often make with their sincerity, for the sake of money and fame.

Several weeks after there was a legal complaint from the chairman of the local Orthodox church community St. Nikola, a neighbour of the Institute of Culturology and members of the political party Russian National Unity, who were opposed to the actions and artistry of Mavromatti. The complaint was ultimately sent back by the Moscow City court, as there was no evidence of a crime having been committed. Later the same complaint, with the help of powerful connections, was sent to the General Attorney's Office. Mavromatti's home was searched on August 7, 2000, and all his video and film materials were confiscated. The film “Oil on Canvas” was never finished. Mavromatti was interrogated three times in the special Department of National Religious Matters, by Yurii Krilov. He was prosecuted under the article 282 of the Russian Criminal Codex, for "inciting religious animosity" like many other contemporary artists and cultural producers in Russia. Mavromatti was facing 3–5 years of prison as a result.

The only remaining film from the scene is a video tape which was shot separately from the film footage. Later this video became well known as a performance under the name "Do Not Believe Your Eyes!". It was shown internationally at places such as The Museum of Contemporary Art, Denver and is part of the respected monograph "Russian Activism 1990-2000" by the Russian art historian Andrej Kovalev.

In 2000, Mavromatti left Russia and since then he has been living and working in Bulgaria and the United States.

== Public execution performance "Ally/ Foe” ==
During the summer of 2010, Mavromatti had re-applied for a Russian passport at the Russian consulate in Bulgaria. Mavromatti was informed that because in Russia, he is under Federal investigation under the Article 282 of the Russian criminal code, for his performance "Do not believe your eyes", his passport cannot be extended. Realizing that the return to Russia will automatically be followed by trial and certain conviction, Oleg Mavromatti decided to perform his show online under the working title "Ally/ Foe”.

A specially modified electric chair will be connected to the Internet via a computer. As a form of performance art, viewers will be given the ability to vote online and decide whether or not Mavromatti should be electrocuted. If the votes “against” Mavromatti will prevail over the number of votes "for" him, the computer will generate the signal, which will launch an electric discharge to Mavromatti's body. Thus, he will be physically punished by the ones who want him to be convicted and imprisoned back home.

== Selected exhibitions, performances ==
- 2010 — The Cow of Desire, performance together with Boryana Rossa as ULTRAFUTURO, Gallery Plastelin, Sofia.
- 2010 — Blood Certificate, together with Boryana Rossa, Exit Art, NY
- 2009 — People's Servants, together with Boryana Rossa, Stedelijk Museum, Amsterdam.
- 2009 — Vitruvian Body, together with Boryana Rossa, at re.act.feminism exhibition, Akademie der Künste, Berlin
- 2009 — Rotte Armie Forever, together with bionihil and Boryana Rossa, in front of the Reichstag, Berlin
- 2008 — Bomb, Studio Dauhaus, Sofia.
- 2008 — «Anti-Halloween» performance together with Boryana Rossa as ULTRAFUTURO, Tallinn Art Hall, Tallinn.
- 2008 — On Air, performance with Boryana Rossa, 8th Biennial August in Art, Varna, Georgi Velchev Museum.
- 2008 — For a Handful of Coins, performance, 13th Panchevo Biennial of Art, Pure expression, Serbia and Montenegro.
- 2007 — Conspiracy of the Castrates, together with Ultrafuturo, exhibition, Red House Center for Culture and Debate, Sofia.
- 2006 — About the Living and the Dead, together with Boryana Rossa, as ULTRAFUTURO, Rencontre internationale d'art performance (RIAP), Quebec City
- 2006 — Before and After, together with Boryana Rossa, Exit Art, NY
- 2006 — The Trickiest Word, Gallery Praktika, Moscow
- 2006 — According to the Text, performance, Dauhaus, Sofia.
- 2005 — UNIT 731, Park of Freedom, Sofia
- 2005 — ART Digital 2004, 1st Moscow Biennale for Contemporary Arts, MARS Gallery
- 2005 — Love me the Way I Love You, performance together with ULTRSFUTURO, Goethe Institute, Sofia
- 2004 — Open Source, National Palace of Culture, Sofia
- 2004 — Roboriada, Performance with ULTRAFUTURO, Goethe Institute, Sofia
- 2003 — Citizen Robot, Irida Gallery, Sofia
- 2001 — Uninstall, performance, Gallery XXL, Sofia.
- 2000 — Citizen X, performance, Guelman Gallery, Moscow
- 2000 — The Great Purge, performance, Sculpture park, Central House of Artists, Moscow.
- 2000 — Do Not Kill!, performance, Poklonnaya Hill, Moscow
- 2000 — Do Not Believe Your Eyes, institute of Culturology, Moscow.
- 1995 — Ending Performance, together with Emperor Wawa, center for Contemporary Art, Moscow

== Filmography ==
=== Director ===
- 2017 — Monkey Ostrich and grave (working title), USA, Belorussia, Bg 2017 (director)
- 2015 — No place for fools (working title), USA, Russian 2011 (director)
- 2011 — Little Knife Leedaboo (working title), USA, expected Spring, 2011 (director)
- 2009 — Blind Spot, USA, 93'
- 2005 — ULTRAFUTURO Manifest, BG, 30'
- 2002 — The Rats are Leaving the Shop, BG/USA, 50'
- 2001 — The Biggest Meatball in the World, BG, 100'
- 2000 — Bastards, RU, 120'
- 2000 — Oil on Canvas, RU. All footage of the film had been confiscated by the Russian police.
- 1997-99 — The Secret Aesthetic of the Martian Spies, 1,2, 3. RU. The master copies had been confiscated by the Russian police.

=== Producer ===
- 2023 — The Notorious Generation: The Green Elephant Calf 2, RU, 89'
- 2017 — Talant, RU, 143'
- 1999 — The Green Elephant Calf, RU, 86'
- 1998 — Кokki the Running Doctor, RU, 80'

=== Actor ===
- 2023 — The Notorious Generation: The Green Elephant Calf 2, RU, 89'
- 2008 — The Juche Idea, 62'
- 1998 — Кokki the Running Doctor, RU, 80'

== Prizes, awards ==
- 2005 – Prize for «The Most Sincere Film» at Festival of Radical Film «Stik» Moscow, for the film «Bastards», 1999.
- 2000 — Grand-Prix International Independent Film and Video festival Dreamcatcher, Kyiv, Ukraine.
