= Svetlana Baskova =

Russian screenwriter, film producer and film director

- Born: Svetlana Yurievna Baskova; 25 May 1965 (age 61); Moscow, RSFSR, USSR
- Education: Moscow Architectural Institute
- Occupations: screenwriter filmmaker painter
- Years active: 1995–present
- Spouse: Anatoly Osmolovsky

Svetlana Yurievna Baskova (Russian: Светлана Юрьевна Баскова; born 25 May 1965, Moscow) is a Russian film director, screenwriter and painter.

== Biography ==
Svetlana Baskova was born 25 May 1965 in Moscow. She graduated from the Moscow Architectural Institute in 1989. Since 1996 she has been making video and movies.

Her first movie, Cocky - Running Doctor was filmed in 1998. The film was produced by renowned artist and director Oleg Mavromatti.

Baskova is perhaps most famous for her 1999 psychedelic exploitation horror film The Green Elephant. The film has gradually gained a cult following due to the large number of scenes of violence, necrophilia and coprophilia. It has also become the subject of internet memes, fan-made music videos and YouTube poops.

Svetlana's next films: Five Bottles of Vodka and The Head became less surreal, but still contained a lot of dark humor, obscene language and psychedelic scenes.

In 2010, filming began for the film For Marx, about the struggle between the independent workers' trade union and the "New Russians". The premiere screening took place at the "Khudozhestvenny" cinema in Ulyanovsk.

Since 2011, she has been the director of the Baza Institute, created jointly by her husband Anatoly Osmolovsky.

== Filmography ==
- Cocky — Running Doctor (1998)
- The Green Elephant (1999)
- Five Bottles of Vodka (2001)
- The Head (2003)
- Mozart (2006)
- Only Decision is Resistance (2011)
- For Marx (2012)
