= Gleb Kalyuzhny =

Russian actor and musician

- Глеб Калюжный
- Born: Gleb Dmitrievich Kalyuzhny; August 14, 1998 (age 28); Moscow, Russia
- Citizenship: Russian
- Occupations: Actor; rapper
- Years active: 2014–present

Gleb Dmitrievich Kalyuzhny (Russian: Глеб Дмитриевич Калюжный; born August 14, 1998) is a Russian actor and musician.

== Biography ==
Kalyuzhny was born on August 14, 1998 in Moscow. He completed nine years of secondary education. Due to financial difficulties in his family and behavioral issues, he frequently changed schools and at one point studied at a school for children with deviant behavior.

His film career began with the feature film 14+. The producers contacted him via VKontakte and invited him to audition, after which he was cast in the lead role. The film was included in the Generation section of the 2015 Berlin International Film Festival. His performance received critical acclaim and earned him the award for Best Actor at the VOICES Young European Film Festival in 2015.

In 2021, Kalyuzhny starred in the Belarusian television series Half an Hour Before Spring, portraying a young Vladimir Mulyavin, the founder and leader of the ensemble Pesnyary. The same year, he also starred in the series Sold Out, playing a young rapper working with a major music label.

Since 2022, he has participated in advertising campaigns for the telecommunications company MTS.

== Criminal case ==
On 5 March 2025, the state news agency RIA Novosti reported that a criminal case had been opened against Kalyuzhny for alleged long-term evasion of compulsory military service under Article 328, Part 1 of the Criminal Code of the Russian Federation. According to the report, the case was initiated due to his failure to appear at a military enlistment office in October 2024 without legal grounds for deferment.

On 7 March 2025, it was reported that after questioning by investigators, Kalyuzhny partially admitted guilt and subsequently reported to the military enlistment office, where he was fined and issued a new draft notice.

On 27 May 2025, it became known that Kalyuzhny had been conscripted into military service, after which the criminal proceedings against him were terminated. He was assigned to the 1st Separate Semenovsky Rifle Regiment.

== Filmography ==
Year	Title	Role	Notes
2015	14+	Lyosha	Film
2016	Red Bracelets	Ilya	TV series
2017	Doctor Richter	Danila	TV series
2017	The Street	Maks Ozerov	TV series
2017	About Love. For Adults Only	Mitya	
2019-2021	Gold Diggers	club singer	
2019–2024	Difficult Teenagers	Maks	TV series
2020–2023	Newcomer	Maksim Pletnev	TV series
2020	A Siege Diary	Russian soldier	
2021	Central Russia's Vampires	Zhenya Dyatlov	TV series
2021	Half an Hour Before Spring	Vladimir Mulyavin	TV series
2023	14+: Continued	Lyosha	
2025	Red Silk	Artyom Svetlov	Film

== Discography ==
=== Studio albums ===
- Frank (2015)
- Street of Truth (2015)
- IDIKOMNE (2019)
- MALENKIYA 12-21 (2020)
- INTOXICACIA (2020)
- JUN1OR (2021)

=== Extended plays ===
- While the Night (2020)
