= Darya Poverennova =

Russian actress

- Born: Darya Vladimirovna Poverennova; June 15, 1972 (age 53); Moscow, RSFSR, USSR
- Occupation: Actress
- Years active: 1992–present

Darya Vladimirovna Poverennova (Russian: Да́рья Влади́мировна Пове́реннова; born June 15, 1972), is a Russian theatre and film actress, and a granddaughter of the great Soviet actor Sergei Lukyanov.

== Biography ==
Darya Poverennova was born on June 15, 1972. The actress' mother spent her career with the Taganka Theatre, and her grandmother, Nadezhda Tyshkevich, was a ballerina in Kiev. Her legendary grandfather, actor Sergei Lukyanov (who appeared in "Kuban Cossacks" and "The Captain's Daughter", died long before her birth. Darya's parents wanted her to follow in her father's footsteps and become a translator; she took intensive English courses and was tutored. However, she felt drawn to the theatre, where she applied, unsuccessfully, for further studies. Despite this negative experience, she took a year to work as a director's assistant. Following this, she was accepted to the Boris Shchukin Theatre Institute and ultimately graduated.

At the end of her second year at the Institute, she married another student and gave birth to a daughter, Polina. Darya is now divorced.

== Theatre ==
As of 1994, she has been affiliated with the Mayakovsky Theatre.

== Filmography ==
Date	Film	Role	Notes
1992	Red Shoe Diaries	Amy	episode Weightless
1994	Venetian Mirror	girl	short
1995	Lato miłości	Sonya	
2000	The Bourgeois's Birthday	Vera	TV mini-series
2001	Demobbed: Again in Battle	Chernikina	
2001	The Bourgeois's Birthday 2	Vera	TV mini-series
2002	Brigada	Nadya	
2003	Why Do You Need an Alibi?		mini-series
2004	Words and Music	episode	
2005	Not Forget	Anya Peskova	TV series
2006	Strong Woman's Weaknesses	Lera Vologdina	TV series
2009	The Sword	Lena Zhurova	TV series
2011	Game	Natalia Kravtsova	TV series
