= Belogorye (station, Amur Oblast) =

Belogorye Белогорье
- Station
- Location within Amur Oblast Location within Russia
- Coordinates: 50°26′N 127°41′E
- Country: Russia
- Region: Amur Oblast
- District: Urban okrug Blagoveshchensk
- Time zone: UTC+9:00

Belogorye (Russian: Белого́рье) is a rural locality (a station) in urban okrug Blagoveshchensk of Amur Oblast, Russia. The population was 27 as of 2018.

== Geography ==
The village is located near the right bank of the Zeya River, 10 km north-east from Blagoveshchensk.
