= Boryana Rossa =

Bulgarian artist (born 1972)

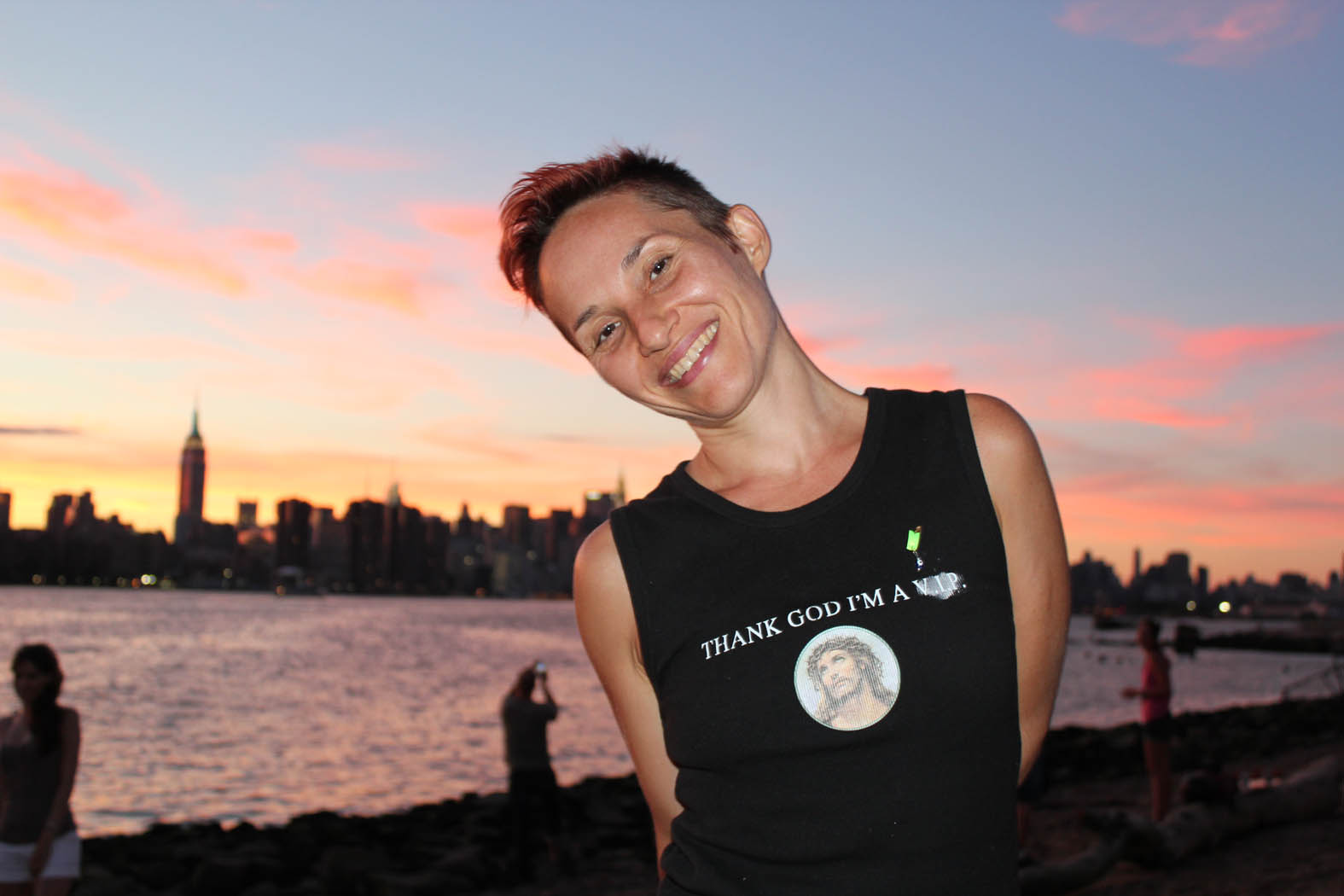
- Born: Boryana Dragoeva
- Education: Rensselaer Polytechnic Institute (Ph.D), National Centre for the Arts in Sofia, Bulgaria (M.A.)
- Occupations: Artist, Filmmaker, Educator
- Writing career
- Genres: Performance Art, BioArt, Video Art
- Website: boryanarossa.com

Boryana Rossa (born 1972) is a Bulgarian interdisciplinary artist and curator making performance art, video and photographic work.

== Life and work ==
Her artwork has been exhibited at the National Gallery of Fine Arts in Sofia, Goethe Institute, the Moscow Biennial, the Elizabeth A. Sackler Center for Feminist Art at the Brooklyn Museum, Exit Art, Biennial for Electronic Art in Perth, and Foundation for Art and Creative Technologies in Liverpool.

Rossa frequently collaborates with artist and filmmaker Oleg Mavromati, often under the title Ultrafuturo—an art collective started in 2004.

She has been awarded the Gaudenz B. Ruf Award for New Bulgarian Art, the Essential Reading for Art Writers Award from the Institute of Contemporary Art in Sofia, and a New York Foundation for the Arts Fellowship in 2014 in Digital/Electronic Arts.

She is the former Associate Professor of Art Video in the Department of Film and Media Arts at Syracuse University.

Rossa identifies herself as a heterosexual woman with a queer identity.

She supports LGBT and queer rights.
