= Andrei Volgin (businessman) =

Russian businessman

Andrei Volgin is a Russian businessman who came to prominence as a player in the early Russian securities market in the aftermath of the collapse of the Soviet Union. Andrei Volgin began his career in finance in the late 1980s at Moscow State University, graduating with a degree in economics.

== Business Ventures ==
In October 1992 Andrei Volgin established Adamant Financial Corporation, one of post-communist Russia's first private equity and corporate restructuring firms. In November 1994, after building up a 39% stake in Russian rubber maker Yaroslavl Rezinotechnika, he persuaded shareholders to give him control in the company, making it one of Russia's first-ever takeovers. In a daytime meeting that lasted until midnight, nearly 90% of the assembly voted to install Volgin's choice as director. By 1995 he controlled 8 of 11 seats on the board and named his father president.

A spin-off company called Adamant Advisory Services was involved in purchasing Russian telecommunications outfits from Metromedia in 2003.

In 1999 Volgin and his wife Elena founded Adamant Media Corporation, one of the world's largest publishers of old and rare book reprints, with over 60,000 titles in many languages. The company sells physical and ebooks through its website, and through Amazon.com.

In 2007 Volgin co-founded Spiral Universe with Reuben Kerben. Spiral is an educational software startup that distributes a software as a service solution for learning management. In 2014 Spiral Universe has been acquired by STI.

== Awards, appointments, and recognition ==
According to The Wall Street Journal Europe, his colleagues described him as "the future of Russia." From 1994 to 1997 Volgin served as chair of the Moscow Public Shareholder's Rights Committee and has consistently spoken out against Western investment in corrupt and insufficiently accountable or responsible Russian companies.

In 1994, at the age of 23, Volgin was appointed by the prime minister of Russia to be a member of the Securities Markets Commission of the Russian government and chair of its Expert Council. Volgin was one of the authors of the Joint-Stock Company Law and Securities Markets Law, both of which were adopted by the Russian Federal Assembly in 1995, and legislation on unit investment funds.

In 1995 The Wall Street Journal named Volgin one of the top 24 young business leaders in Central and Eastern Europe. In 1997, Mr. Volgin was the youngest person to be placed on Global Finance's list of the 600 most influential financiers in the world. In 1997 the Russian Biographic Institute named Volgin the "Person of the Year" in the category of business.

== Publications ==
- Andrei Volgin, Yuri Milner. Voucher Investment Funds in Russia. In Creating Private Enterprises and Efficient Markets. The World Bank. Washington, 1994.
- Andrei Volgin. The Changing Face of Russian Business Elite. Private Wealth Management. 1995/1996. Campden Publishing Limited. London, 1996.
- Clifford Gaddy, Barry Ickes, Andrei Mazharov, and Andrei Volgin. Russia's "Virtual Economy": an Update for Investors. The Brookings Institution. Washington, 1998.

== See also ==
- Economic history of the Russian Federation
- History of post-Soviet Russia
- Privatization in Russia
- Economy of Russia
