= Andrey Volgin (film director) =

Russian film director, producer, editor and cinematographer

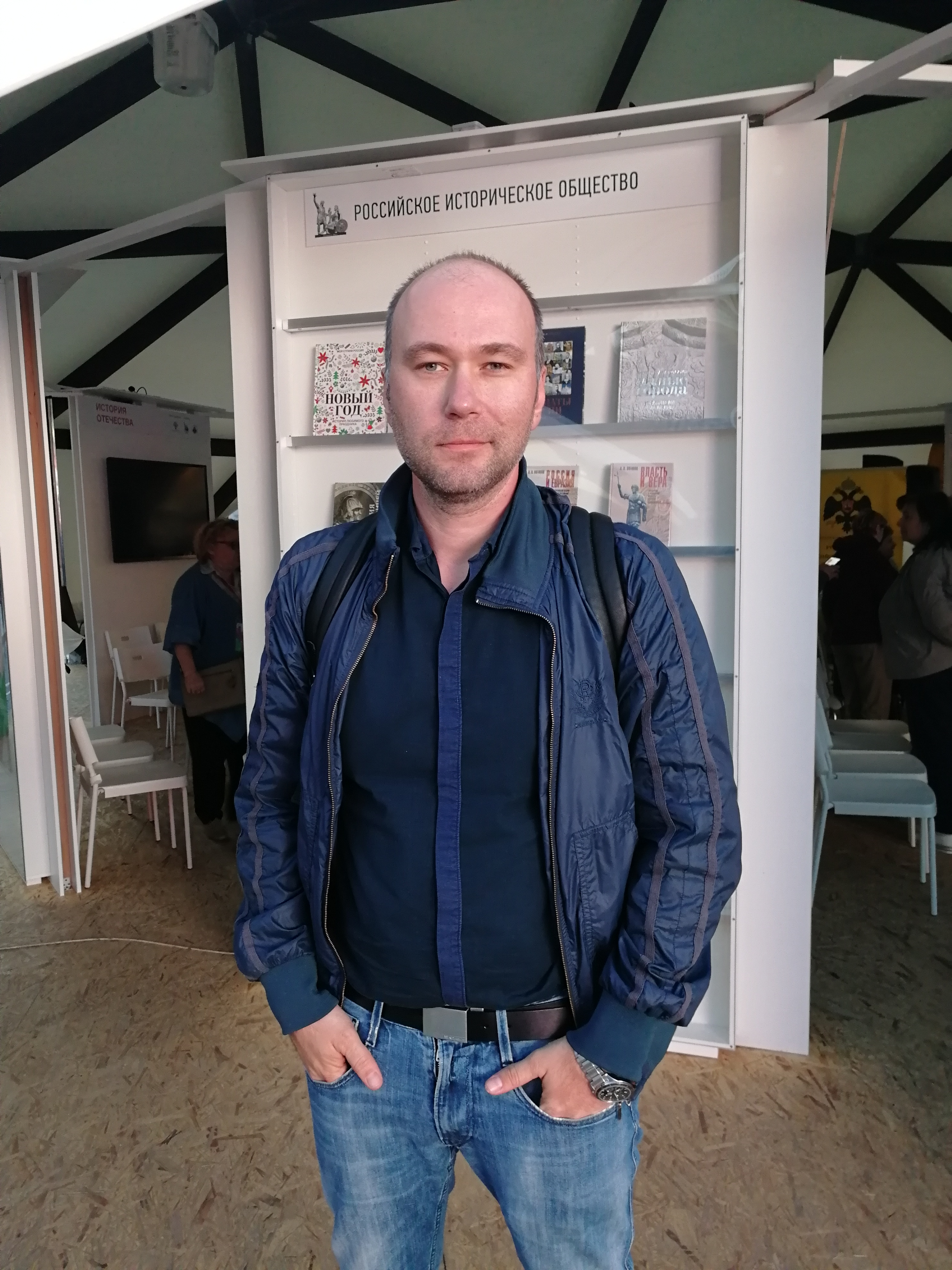
- Born: Andrey Volgin; December 22, 1981 (age 43); Soviet Union (now Russia)
- Citizenship: Russian Federation
- Occupation(s): film director, producer, editor, cinematographer

Andrey Volgin (Russian: Андрей Волгин; born 22 December 1981) is a Russian film director, producer, editor and cinematographer.

== Biography ==
Andrey studied at the Faculty of Film and Television Direction at the University of Natalia Nesterova. In 1998 he began work in advertising and he took part in the production of more than 50 videos.

== Filmography ==
=== As director ===
- Tonight the Angels Cried (2008)
- Spiral (2014)
- Run! (2016)
- Dance to Death (2017)
- Seryozhka (2018)
- The Balkan Line (2019)
- Red Silk (2025)

=== As cinematographer ===
- Hope (2002)

=== As editor ===
- Seryozhka (2018)

=== As producer ===
- Seryozhka (2018)
