= Anatoly Osmolovsky =

Russian artist

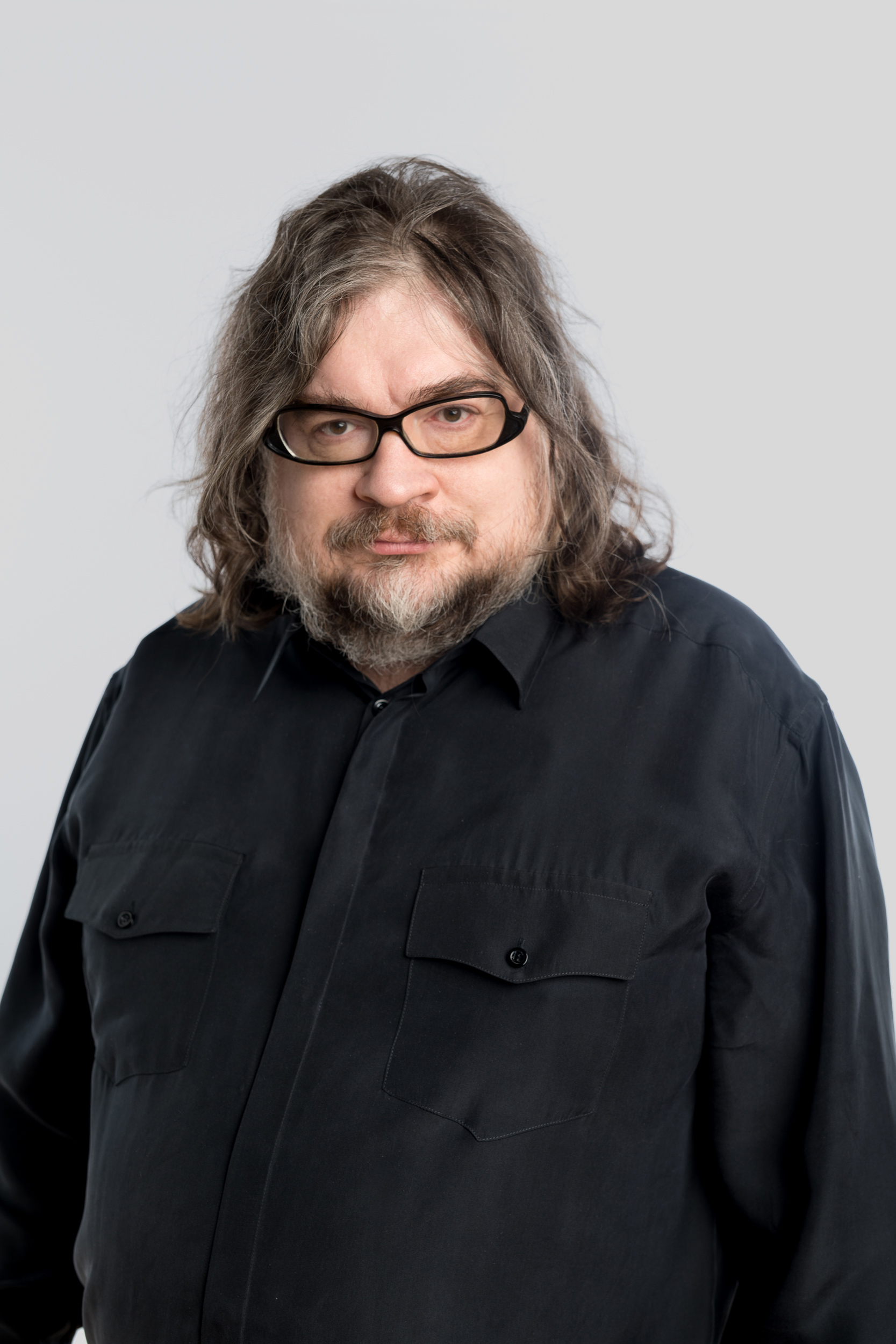
Anatoly Osmolovsky

Anatoly Feliksovich Osmolovsky (Russian: Анатолий Феликсович Осмоловский; born July 1, 1969 (age 57) in Moscow), is a Russian visual artist, performer, theorist, editor and teacher. He resided in Moscow where he sculpts wood. Since 2024 resides in Berlin. Osmolovsky grounds his art in theory and supports his work with self-published writings in Radek (1993) and Base (2010) magazines and by teaching art history.

== Concepts ==
At the start of his career, the most important issues for Osmolovsky were those of power and revolution. Osmolovsky opposed the school of Moscow conceptualism.

In the mid nineties, there was a common element of male nudity and sexualized violence in the work of Moscow artists, including that of Osmolovsky. Osmolovsky was the leader of the anti-postmodernist movement, revolutionary Rival Programme NETSEZUDIK".

On the topic of post-modernism in post-Soviet Russia, he said,

"The future of contemporary art is in the will to utopia, in the breakthrough into reality through a membrane of quotations, it is in sincerity and pathos."

In 2000, Osmolovsky talked about a new era of Russian art, full of fun, irresponsibility and superficiality. Viktor Misiano, curator of contemporary art, (born 1957, Moscow) in the text Reflexive fetishism in Anatoly Osmolovsky, explained the cause and consistency of Osmolovsky's transition from performance art and political protest to abstract and formal art.

== Works ==
=== 1990 ===
Osmolovsky began his career in performance art with works representing protest, for example, against government institutions and the judiciary.

- E.A.T. (Art Territory Expropriation) (1990 and 1992). E.A.T. performances included, Silent parade (Crawling), (performers crawled on the road from the metro Mayakovskaya to Mayakovsky monument in Moscow, symbolizing the transition from socialism to capitalism as a crawl in the mud); and The days of knowledge, Regina Art Gallery, Moscow ("a parody of the human chain at the White House").

=== 1992 ===
- Leopards burst into the temple at Regina Gallery, Moscow. The title was taken from an article by Jean Baudrillard: "The leopards burst into the temple and break the holy vessels". For Osmolovsky, the vessels represent the tradition of Russian art and conceptualism which he considers outdated and boring.
- Ideological carrier a project for Flash Art magazine. People with body parts painted red or black made gestures such as the victory sign.
- After Post-Modernism you can only shout, at Multiplicity Culture. Art routes in a changing world, Folklore Museum, Rome, and Liaisons Dangereaux, Centre of Contemporary Art, Moscow group presentations. Osmolovsky presented a series of 12 photographs in baroque frames depicting faces of artists who scream accompanied by the sound of each scream. Part of the work is housed in the Tretyakov Gallery, Moscow.
- 4th International Biennial of Istanbul.

=== 1993 ===
- Nezesudik. Revolutionary Competitive Program, a publishing project for Osmolovsky's magazine, Radek.
- Shame on October 7. A performance by Osmolovsky and three others protesting the Yeltsin government. Depicted on the first cover of Radek.
- Travel to Brobdingneg Land, a reference to the island of the giants in the novel by Jonathan Swift Gulliver's Travels. Osmolovsky climbed on the statue of Mayakovsky in Red Square, Moscow, reciting the words of Isaac Newton: "If I have seen further, it is by standing on the shoulders of giants."
- 45th Venice Biennale in the Pavilion Aperto, curated by Achille Bonito Oliva. The work consisted of two photographs: Chaos - My house, depicting the chaos of the fall of the Soviet Union, and Odd man out depicting extreme individualism and aggression of post-Soviet Russia.

=== 1995 - 1999 ===
- Caravanserai of Contemporary Art, Cultural Association Arte Nova, Pescara, curated by Giacinto Di Pietrantonio, (1995). Osmolovsky presented No means No, a photographic work in which he reinterpreted the handshake.
- Situative Action for PDS a solo exhibition (1996) presented after Osmolovsky's period of residence at the Kunstlerhaus Bethanien at the Kunstlerhaus Bethanien. Included seminars on political and social issues related to the German Socialist Party (PDS) with a display of posters with slogans and iconic graphics.
- Barricade (1998) in Gertsen and Nikitskaya street, Moscow (near the Kremlin). Cardboard boxes, slogans, objects and reproductions of paintings blocked the road in a tribute to the French students‘ riots of 1968 on the occasion of their thirtieth anniversary.
- Played as a military officer in the Baskova film The Green Elephant.

=== 2000 - 2003 ===
- Monument to the brilliant and victorious General of NATO Dr. Freud (2000), for Manifesta III, Ljubljana, Slovenia. A sculpture made from artillery parts.
- Inpozitsiya (2001) for Workshop Art Moscow, Central House of Artists, Moscow. Osmolovsky presented objects such as flags and books, symbols such as the 5-pointed star and texts, some hardwood floors ripped and worked.
- 25th Bienal de Sao Paulo, Sao Paulo, Brazil, 2002.
- Dovunque è vita (Everywhere is life), 50th Venice Biennale (2003). Osmolovsky presented an 84 x 60 cm poster as part of a series of 139 posters commissioned for the section, Utopia Station by Molly Nesbit, Hans-Ulrich Obrist and Rirkrit Tiravanija, posted along the outer walls of the Arsenale.

=== 2004 - 2005 ===
- Bugs, Cuts, Details and Pieces (2004), a sculpture series in wood and enamel for the exhibition The Way Political Positions Turn into Form at Stella Art Gallery, Moscow.
- Za Czerwonym Horyzontem, Zamek Ujazdowski, Warsaw, (2004) a group showing.
- Dusty phrases (2005). Osmolovsky put double-sided transparent tape on the wall in the shape of words composed horizontally. Dust accumulating on these words, making them readable. There were phrases and quotes from political and social issues, accompanied by an installation of flags, boxes, tubes, posters, and photographs. The work was recreated in 2005 for the group show, Angels of History at MuHKA, Antwerp.

=== 2006 ===
- Nathalie Sarrante Golden Fruit (2006), solo exhibition at Contemporary City Foundation, Moscow. Osmolovsky presented a series of sculptures both hanging on the wall and placed on the floor, in a shape resembling large oranges with artificial colors and also the blue and gold colours of Orthodox churches.
- Hardware (2006) a solo showing at Stella Art Gallery, Moscow. This work was a series of 11 bronze sculptures of tanks representing the countries: Brazil, Britain, Germany, Israel, Italy, Russia, USA, France, South Africa and Japan. The prototype for all the tanks was the Russian Black Eagle tank. The aim was to give beauty to an object whose design was exclusively functional. It was represented at Documenta XII, Kassel, Germany in 2007.
- Russia!, Guggenheim Museum Bilbao, Bilbao, (2006), a group exhibition.
- Modus R: Russian Formalism Today, Newton Building, Miami, (2000), a group exhibition.

=== 2007 ===
- Kandinsky Prize, artist of the year, Moscow.
- Progressive Nostalgia, Centre for Contemporary Art, Luigi Pecci, Prato.
- Who's Got the Big Picture?, MuHKA, Antwerp.
- I Believe!, Winzavod Contemporary Art Centre, Moscow.
- History of Russian Video Art - Volume I, Moscow Museum of Contemporary Art, Moscow.
- Urban Formalism, Moscow Museum of Contemporary Art, Moscow.
- Thinking realism, State Tretyakov Gallery.
- Moscow On Geekdom, Benaki Museum, Athens.

=== 2008 ===
- Bread series, a series of sculptures made of dark linden wood, with hints of gold and bronze on the front. The wood is shaped into a curve and carved on the front in a complex pattern of cavities. The drawings are made from a three-dimensional scan of slices of black bread which yields a symmetrical pattern that is carved into the wood by a machine. The wood surface is then treated with acids and gold paint to create an aged look. The Bread series sculptures recall Russian icons (in the wooden materials and the golden sheen), and slices of typical Russian bread. Osmolovsky often put these sculptures in wall compositions, reminding the audience of the typical iconostasis of the Russian Orthodox Church. In 2008, he exhibited Bread series sculptures in the solo show New Works at Marat Guelman Gallery, Moscow.

=== 2009 - 2012 ===
- Totem, a wood carving at the third Moscow Biennale, GARAGE Center for Contemporary Culture, Moscow and the PERMM, Perm, Eastern Russia.
- Modernikon, Contemporary Art from Russia (2010), curated by Francesco Bonami and Irene Calderoni at Fondazione Sandretto Re Rebaudengo, Turin.
- Materia prima. Russkoe Bednoe. L’arte povera in Russia (2011), curated by Marat Guelman, Pac, Milan.
- Ostalgia (2011), curated by Massimiliano Gioni with Jarrett Gregory, New Museum of Contemporary Art, New York.
- Blind hole (2012) group showing, Thomas Brambilla Gallery, Bergamo.

=== 2013 ===
- Cadavre Exquisi and Dodici Suicidi, Thomas Brambilla gallery, Bergamo. It was his first solo exhibition in a private gallery in Europe.
- Parallel Convergences, Venice Biennale, Tre Oci arts centre, Giudecca, Venice.
