= Belogorye, Voronezh Oblast =

Belogorye Белогорье
- Selo
- Location within Voronezh Oblast Location within Russia
- Coordinates: 50°29′N 40°00′E
- Country: Russia
- Region: Voronezh Oblast
- District: Podgorensky District
- Time zone: UTC+3:00

Belogorye (Russian: Белого́рье) is a rural locality (a selo) and the administrative center of Beloroyevskoye Rural Settlement, Podgorensky District, Voronezh Oblast, Russia. The population was 2,171 as of 2010. There are 28 streets.

== Geography ==
Belogorye is located 32 km northeast of Podgorensky (the district's administrative centre) by road. Aleksandrovka Donskaya is the nearest rural locality.
