= Traverse City Film Festival =

Annual film festival in Traverse City, Michigan, US

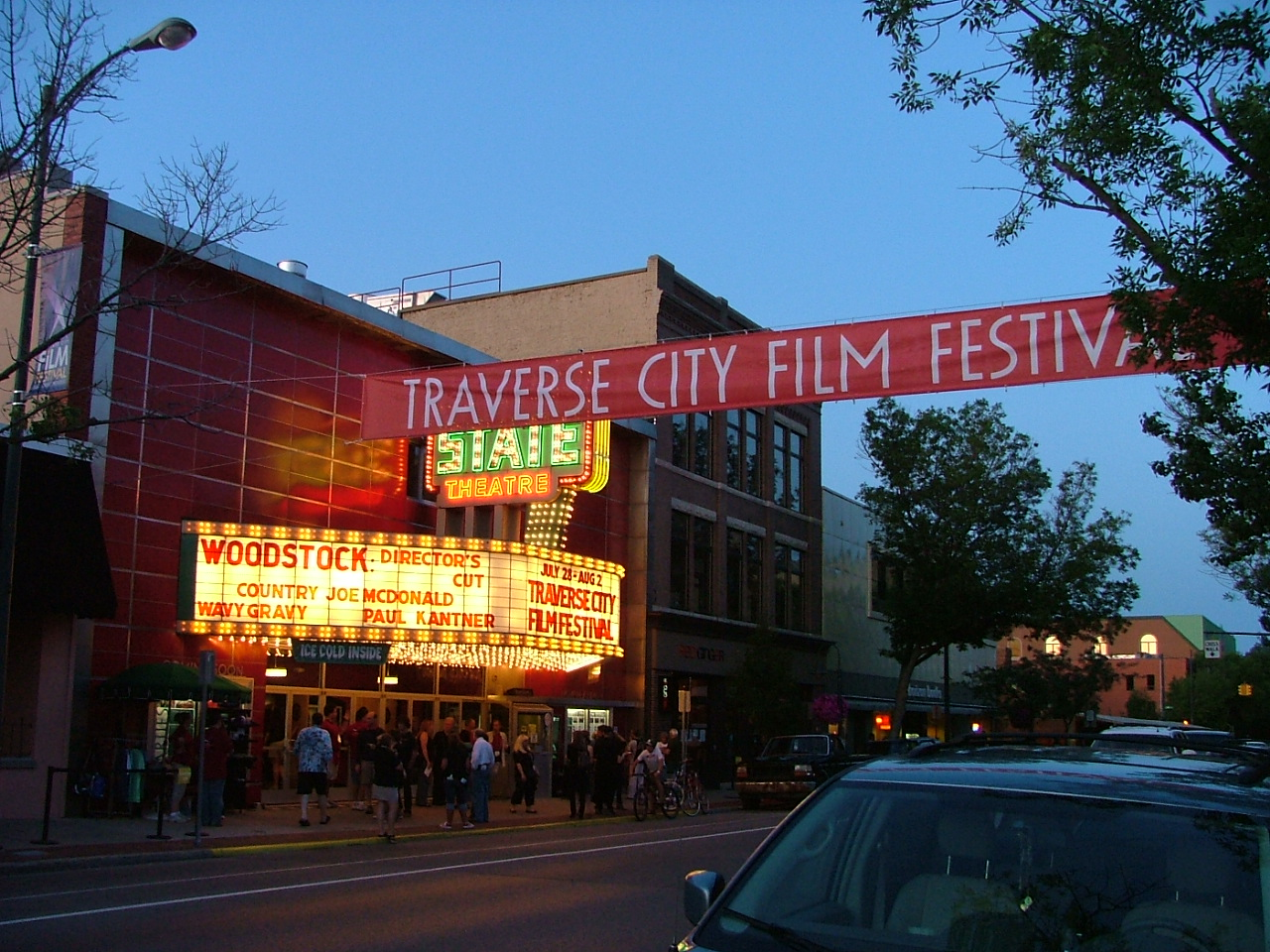
- Scene from outside the State Theatre
- Status: on hiatus
- Genre: film festival
- Location: Traverse City, Michigan
- Country: United States
- Years active: 20–21
- Inaugurated: 2005
- Founders: Michael Moore, Doug Stanton
- Website: www.traversecityfilmfest.org

The Traverse City Film Festival was an annual film festival held at the end of July in Traverse City, Michigan. The festival was created as an annual event in 2005 to help “save one of America's few indigenous art forms—the cinema". The event was co-founded by Michael Moore, the Oscar-winning film director, well known for his anti-establishment films and documentaries such as Fahrenheit 9/11, Bowling for Columbine, and Roger & Me, along with author Doug Stanton and photographer John Robert Williams.

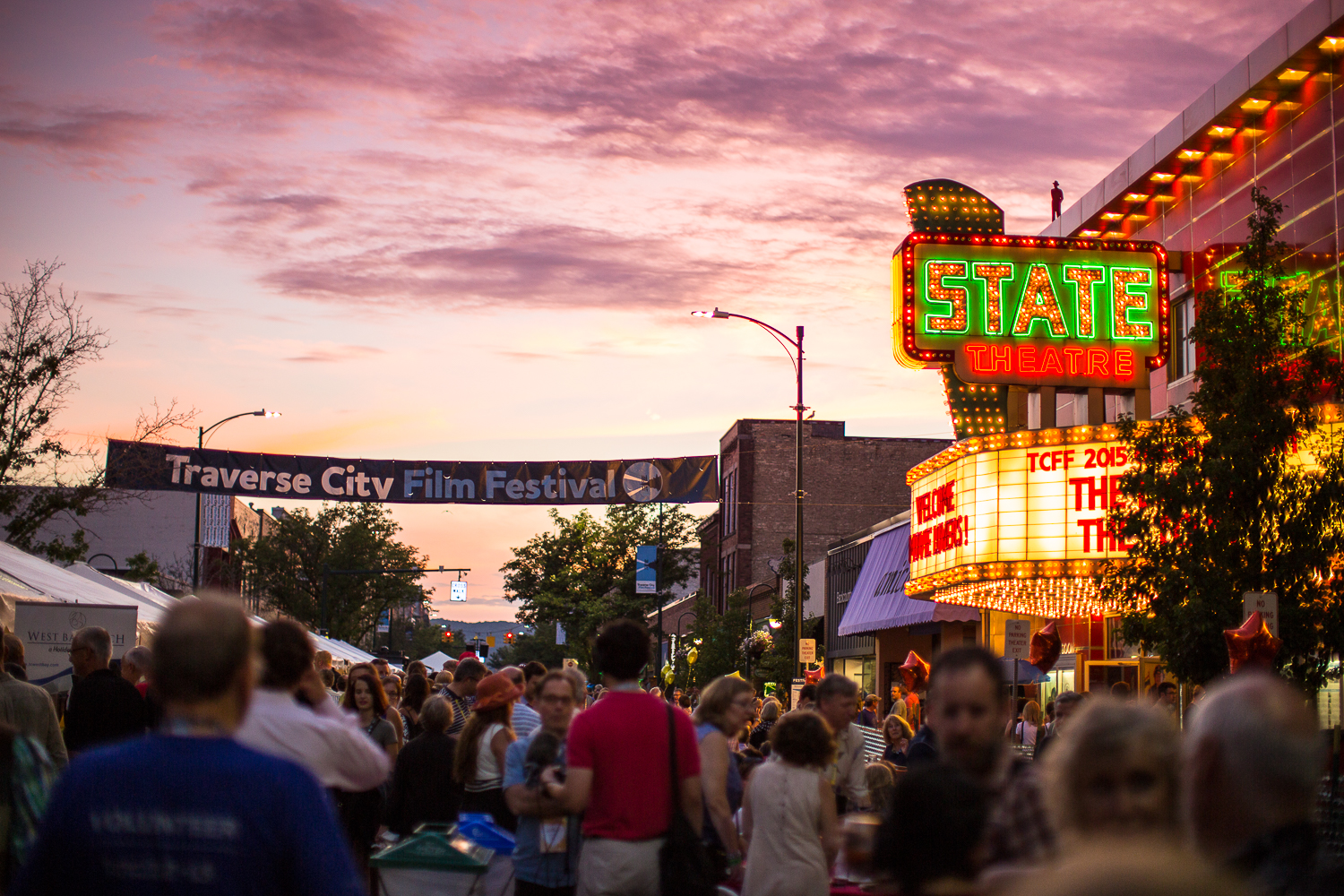
2015 TCFF Opening Night downtown Traverse City

The mission of the Festival was to show "Just Great Movies" that represent excellence in filmmaking, particularly those rare independent films and documentaries by both noted and new filmmakers, that do not receive mainstream distribution.

The Traverse City Film Festival is a non-profit organization, and is funded by businesses, community groups and individuals, in addition to ticket sales accumulated by various events. The Festival is headed by a board of directors of filmmakers, writers, and creative professionals. Traverse City Film Festival also showcases all volunteer music, with over 60 regional artists featured in the 2016 event.

== Official selections ==
=== 2005 ===
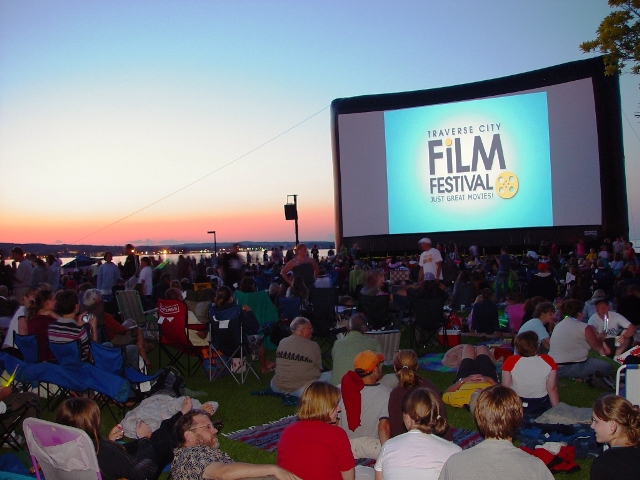
Open Space film screening

The 1st annual Traverse City Film Festival was held July 27–31, 2005. The 5-day event featured many independent films, plus four classic films. The independent films were shown in three indoor venues in downtown Traverse City: the State Theatre, the Old Town Playhouse, and the City Opera House. In addition, each night, a classic film was shown on a giant inflatable screen along West Grand Traverse Bay in the city's Open Space Park. Broken Flowers, a winner at the 2005 Cannes Film Festival, was shown at the Traverse City Film Festival before being released to the general public. Other 2005 Traverse City Film Festival selections covered a gamut of film subjects ranging from period romances, unemployment, terrorism, among many other subjects.

- 11′09″01 September 11
- The Assassination of Richard Nixon
- The Ax
- Balzac and the Little Chinese Seamstress
- The Baxter — Audience Grand Prize
- Broken Flowers
- Czech Dream — Nonfiction Prize
- Downfall — Fiction Prize
- The Edukators — Founders' Grand Prize
- Enron: The Smartest Guys in the Room — Scariest Film
- A Good Woman
- Grizzly Man — Founders' Grand Prize
- Gunner Palace
- Home of the Brave
- Italian for Beginners — Preservationist Award
- Time Out
- Land of Plenty
- Les Misérables — Preservationist Award
- The Life of Brian — Mike's Surprise
- Mad Hot Ballroom
- Me and You and Everyone We Know
- Mondovino
- My Summer of Love
- Human Resources
- The Talent Given Us — Best First Film
- Tarnation — Stanley Kubrick Prize
- The Woodsman

Free Movies at the Open Space:

- Casablanca
- Ferris Bueller's Day Off
- Jaws
- The Princess Bride

=== 2006 ===
The second annual Traverse City Film Festival was held July 31 – August 6, 2006. Michigan Filmmaker Award went to Jeff Daniels.

- a/k/a Tommy Chong
- Air Guitar Nation — Audience Prize (Silver)
- Amadeus
- The Beauty Academy of Kabul
- Borat: Cultural Learnings of America for Make Benefit Glorious Nation of Kazakhstan — Excellence in Filmmaking Award
- Born on the Fourth of July
- Caché
- The Canary Effect — Stanley Kubrick Award for Bold and Innovative Filmmaking
- The Dying Gaul
- Far and Away
- Flirting with Disaster
- Fresh
- Hotel Rwanda
- I Want Someone to Eat Cheese With
- An Inconvenient Truth
- Innocent Voices
- Iraq in Fragments
- Iron Island
- Jesus Camp — Scariest Film Award
- John and Jane
- Joyeux Noël
- Kiss Kiss Bang Bang
- L'America
- The Moustache
- Little Miss Sunshine — Audience Prize (Bronze)
- Lost Skeleton of Cadavra
- Men at Work — Founders Prize
- Nine Lives
- O Lucky Malcolm
- Paradise Now
- Pittsburgh
- President Mir Qanbar
- The Prize Winner of Defiance, Ohio — 'Splain Award (why this film wasn't brought to Traverse City)
- The Promise
- The Road to Guantánamo — Founders Prize
- Scoop
- Soldiers Pay
- Some Mother's Son
- Son of Man — Founders Prize
- The Squid and the Whale
- Street Thief — Homeland Security Award
- The Three Burials of Melquiades Estrada
- Slacker Uprising – Mike's Surprise
- This Film Is Not Yet Rated
- Three Kings
- Tsotsi
- The TV Set
- Viva Zapatero! — Audience Prize (Gold)
- The War Tapes — Best Cinematography
- Who Killed the Electric Car? — Roger Smith Award
- Winter Passing — Best Use of the Words Traverse City in a Feature Film
- Wordplay — Best Action Film
- Zathura

Stanley Kubrick Tribute:

- 2001: A Space Odyssey
- Barry Lyndon
- A Clockwork Orange
- Eyes Wide Shut
- Full Metal Jacket
- The Killing
- Lolita
- Paths of Glory
- The Shining
- Spartacus
- Stanley Kubrick: A Life in Pictures

Free Movies at the Open Space:

- Dr. Strangelove
- Jurassic Park
- Monty Python and the Holy Grail
- Napoleon Dynamite
- Pee-wee's Big Adventure
- The Wizard of Oz

=== 2007 ===
The third annual festival was held July 31 – August 5, 2007. Michigan Filmmaker Award went to Christine Lahti.

- 9 Star Hotel
- Al Franken: God Spoke
- Arctic Tale
- Away from Her
- Black Butterfly
- Black Sheep
- Blame it on Fidel — Special Jury Prize for Narrative Perspective
- Blue State
- The Bridge on the River Kwai
- Chicago 10
- Curse of the Golden Flower
- Day Night Day Night
- Deliver Us from Evil
- Dont Look Back
- Eleven Men Out
- Everything's Cool
- The Fever of '57
- Fireworks Wednesday
- Grace Is Gone
- The Graduate
- The Host
- I Am an American Soldier — Special Founders Prize
- In a Lonely Place
- In the Shadow of the Moon
- The King of Kong
- Little Children
- The Lives of Others
- Maxed Out
- Mephisto
- Miss Navajo — Special Founders Prize
- Molière
- My Best Friend
- Nashville
- Nimrod Nation
- No End in Sight — Special Jury Prize/Audience Award Non-Fiction Film
- Notes on a Scandal
- Once — Founders Prize
- Our Daily Bread
- Paprika
- Paris, je t'aime
- Pierrepoint: The Last Hangman
- Please Vote for Me — Founders Prize
- Rocket Science — Best Fiction Film
- Sherrybaby
- Sicko Deleted Scenes — Mike's Surprise
- The Situation — Stanley Kubrick Prize for Bold and Innovative Filmmaking
- Slaughterhouse-Five
- A Slim Peace
- Talk to Me — Special Jury Prize for Outstanding Writing/Audience Award Fiction Film
- Taxi to the Dark Side
- The Ten
- Trainwreck: My Life as an Idiot — Special Founders Prize
- Tuya's Marriage — Special Jury Prize for Visual Impact/Kodak Cinematography Prize
- The Valet
- Waitress
- War/Dance — Best Non-Fiction Film
- West Bank Story

Free Movies at the Open Space:

- E.T. the Extra-Terrestrial
- Grease
- North by Northwest
- Raiders of the Lost Ark

=== 2008 ===
The fourth annual festival took place July 29 – August 3, 2008. There was a special appearance by Madonna, on August 2, 2008, in order to introduce her film I Am Because We Are. Michigan Filmmaker Award went to Kurt Luedtke. Also this year was the world premiere for Religulous.

- Absurdistan
- Anvil! The Story of Anvil
- Baghdad High
- Bigger, Stronger, Faster — Special Jury Prize for Amazing Non-Fiction Film Construction
- Blow-Up
- Body of War — Best Documentary/Audience Award Best Non-Fiction Film
- Buddha Collapsed Out of Shame — Founders Prize
- Captain Abu Raed — Audience Award Best Fiction Film/Best of Fest Fiction Film
- CSNY/Déjà Vu
- The Deal
- Dinner with the President: A Nation's Journey
- The Diving Bell and the Butterfly
- Dust
- Encounters at the End of the World
- Flash of Genius
- 4 Months, 3 Weeks and 2 Days
- Frozen River — Best American Indie Fiction Film
- Funny Face
- The General
- Gonzo: The Life and Work of Dr. Hunter S. Thompson
- Goodbye Bafana
- The Grocer's Son — Best Foreign Indie Fiction Film
- Hamlet 2 — Firefighters Award for Excellence in Humor
- Head Wind
- Helvetica
- I Am Because We Are
- Idiocracy
- Johnny Got His Gun
- Kenny — The Bamboozler Award Funniest Fiction Feature
- The Last Winter
- A League of Their Own
- Let the Right One In
- Man in the Chair
- Man on Wire
- Michael Moore: Live In London — Mike's Surprise
- Miss Gulag
- Mongol
- The Objective
- Older Than America
- On the Town
- Paraiso Travel
- Persepolis
- The Pope's Toilet — Best Storytelling Fiction Film
- Pray the Devil Back to Hell — Best Non-Fiction Film
- A President to Remember: In the Company of John F. Kennedy
- The Prisoner or: How I Planned to Kill Tony Blair
- Profit motive and the whispering wind — Founders Prize
- Redacted
- Religulous
- Sleep Dealer
- Song Sung Blue
- The Substitute
- Sympathy for the Lobster
- Tell No One — Film Incentive Award Should Have Been Shot Here
- Battle for Terra
- Theater of War — Stanley Kubrick Prize for Bold and Innovative Filmmaking
- Them
- Trouble the Water — Best American Historical Document
- Trumbo
- Up the Yangtze
- Vicky Cristina Barcelona
- War, Inc.
- War, Love, God, & Madness
- When Did You Last See Your Father?
- Wild Strawberries
- Yonkers Joe
- The Youngest Candidate — Best Non-Fiction Film by a New Filmmaker

Free Movies at the Open Space:

- Ghostbusters
- The Best of Looney Tunes
- Singin' in the Rain
- Back to the Future
- A League of Their Own

=== 2009 ===
The fifth annual festival was held from July 28 – August 2, 2009. There were 123 screenings of films from over 30 countries. Michigan Filmmaker Award went to Rich Brauer.

- About Elly
- The Answer Man
- Azur and Asmar
- The Baader Meinhof Complex
- Big Fan
- Blood in the Face — Mike's Surprise
- Bob & Carol & Ted & Alice
- Burma VJ
- The Chaser
- Chomsky & Company
- The Cove — Best Documentary, Jury Award
- Crude — Special Jury Prize for Environmental Documentary
- Dead Snow
- Defamation — Stanley Kubrick Award for Bold and Innovative Filmmaking, Documentary
- Departures — Best Fiction Film, Audience Award
- Earth Days
- Eden is West — Founders Prize for Best Foreign Fiction Film
- The End of the Line — Best Foreign Documentary, Jury Award
- Enemies, A Love Story
- Entre nos — Special Jury Prize, First Narrative Feature Film
- Everlasting Moments — Special Jury Prize, Human Spirit
- Examined Life
- Food, Inc. — Best Documentary, Audience Award
- Football Under Cover
- The Garden
- The Girlfriend Experience
- The Greatest — Best Fiction Film U.S., Jury Award
- Harmony and Me — Stanley Kubrick Award for Bold and Innovative Filmmaking, Fiction Film
- Helen + Joy
- Herb & Dorothy
- Humpday
- In the Loop — Founders Prize for Funniest Fiction Film
- Julie & Julia
- Laila's Birthday
- Learning Gravity — Michigan Prize
- Lemon Tree
- Mary and Max — Best Fiction Film Foreign, Jury Award
- A Matter of Life and Death
- A Matter of Size — Firefighter's Award for Best Comedy Film
- Metropolis
- Mike's Surprise
- No Impact Man
- O'Horten — Special Jury Prize for Original Storytelling
- The Only Good Indian
- Outrage
- Patrik, Age 1.5
- Rachel — Founders Prize for Best Overall Documentary
- Registered Sex Offender — Stanley Kubrick Award for Bold and Innovative Filmmaking, Fiction Film
- The Rest Is Silence
- Revanche
- Roger & Me
- Rudo y Cursi
- Saint Misbehavin'
- Salt of this Sea — Founders Prize for a First Time Filmmaker
- Seraphine
- Sita Sings the Blues
- Soundtrack for a Revolution
- Sugar
- Sunshine Barry and the Disco Worms
- Troubled Water — Opening Night Film
- An Unmarried Woman
- Valentino: The Last Emperor
- Waltz with Bashir
- Waterlife
- Which Way Home — Special Jury Prize for Human Rights
- William Kunstler: Disturbing the Universe — Special Jury Prize for a New Filmmaker
- Winnebago Man — Founders Prize for Best Comedy Documentary
- Woodstock: The Director's Cut

Free Movies at the Open Space:

- Big
- Close Encounters of the Third Kind
- Hair
- The Goonies
- Men in Black

=== 2010 ===
The sixth annual festival was held from July 27 – August 1, 2010. Michigan Filmmaker Award went to John Hughes.

Opening and Closing Night:

- The Kids Are All Right
- Nowhere Boy
- The Girl Who Played With Fire

TCFF 3D:

- Cane Toads: The Conquest
- U2 3D

Comedy & Drama from Home and Abroad:

- Apart Together
- A Brand New Life
- Castaway on the Moon — Best Original Vision, Fiction Jury Award
- Cherry
- Cherry Blossoms
- The Concert — Best Fiction Film, Audience Award
- Farsan — Fiction Jury Prize for Breakthrough Performance (Jan Fares)
- The French Kissers
- The Happy Poet — Fiction Jury Prize for Emerging Talent (Paul Gordon)
- Heartbreaker
- In the Beginning — Best Film, Fiction Jury Award
- The Infidel
- Lebanon, PA — Founders Prize, Fiction Award
- Legacy
- The Man Next Door
- Me and Orson Welles
- Mid-August Lunch — Best Debut Feature, Fiction Jury Award
- Please Give
- The Secret in Their Eyes
- Solitary Man
- Tiny Furniture — Fiction Jury Prize for Emerging Talent (Lena Dunham)
- The Trotsky
- Welcome
- When We Leave
- Will You Marry Us? — Top Founders Prize

The Beatles at the Movies (A 40th Anniversary):

- A Hard Day's Night
- Help!
- Nowhere Boy

A Salute to Cuban Film:

- Dreaming in Blue
- Horn of Plenty
- Strawberry and Chocolate
- Viva Cuba

Shorts Programs:

- Short Documentaries
- Shorts by Jon Alpert
- Shorts by Rory Kennedy
- Shorts by U of M Students
- Short Fiction 1
- Short Fiction 2
- Shorts for Midnight

Dangerous Docs:

- 8: The Mormon Proposition
- 11/4/08
- 12th & Delaware
- American Radical: The Trials of Norman Finkelstein
- Auto*Mate
- Budrus — Stanley Kubrick Award for Bold and Innovative Filmmaking
- Cleanflix
- Collapse
- Czech Peace
- Draquila – Italy Trembles
- The Elephant in the Living Room — Founders Prize, Nonfiction Award
- GasLand — Best Environmental Film, Nonfiction Jury Award
- Google Baby
- Harlan – In the Shadow of Jew Süss
- His & Hers (2009 film) — Best Nonfiction Foreign, Jury Award
- How to Fold a Flag — Best Nonfiction U.S., Jury Award
- Iranian Cookbook
- The Miscreants of Taliwood — Best Film, Nonfiction Jury Award
- The Most Dangerous Man in America: Daniel Ellsberg and the Pentagon Papers — Best Nonfiction Film, Audience Award
- The Oath
- Restrepo
- Rush: Beyond the Lighted Stage
- Smile 'Til It Hurts — Special Jury Prize, Nonfiction Jury Award
- South of the Border
- Teenage Paparazzo
- The Tillman Story — Founders Prize, Nonfiction Award
- Waiting for "Superman" — Best Human Rights Film, Nonfiction Jury Award

Midnight:

- Clash
- Tucker & Dale vs. Evil
- Zonad

Special Screenings:

- This Divided State - Mike's Surprise
- Dodsworth: Jeff Garlin's Gems
- Reel Injun Spirit Award, Nonfiction Jury Award/Special Founders Prize
- The Last Command (with the Alloy Orchestra)

Kids Fest:

- The Secret of Kells
- Kirikou and the Sorceress
- Oblivion Island
- Eleanor's Secret

Free Movies at the Open Space:

- Twister
- Finding Nemo
- Help!
- Raising Arizona
- Indiana Jones and the Last Crusade
- Mary Poppins

=== 2011 ===
The seventh annual festival was held from July 26–31, 2011. There were films at the festival this year from every continent except Antarctica. This was also the first year of Kids Fest on the lawn outside of the newly renovated Lars Hockstad auditorium. Michigan Filmmaker Award went to Sue Marx.

Opening and Closing Night:

- Even the Rain
- Made in Dagenham
- Modern Times

US Indies:

- All Good Things
- Everything Must Go — Best Screenplay in a US Narrative Film, Jury
- Hesher — Best US Narrative Film, Jury
- Higher Ground
- Rabbit Hole
- Rid of Me — Founders Prize for Best US Fiction Film

New Foreign Cinema:

- Black Butterflies
- Bride Flight
- Face to Face — Founders Prize for Best World Fiction Film
- Four Lions — Best World Narrative Screenplay, Jury
- The Guard
- In a Better World — Audience Award for Best Fiction Film
- Incendies — Best World Narrative Film, Jury
- Largo Winch
- Miral
- My Piece of the Pie
- The Princess of Montpensier
- Queen to Play — Founders Prize for Best World Fiction Film
- Romantics Anonymous — Founders Prize for Best of Fest
- The Trip
- Trophy Wife
- The Women on the 6th Floor — Founders Prize for Best World Fiction Film
- Young Goethe in Love

State Theatre Centennial Celebration:

- L'Inferno
- Wild & Weird: Alloy Orchestra's Favorite Short Silent Films

50th Anniversary of To Kill a Mockingbird:

- Hey, Boo: Harper Lee
- To Kill a Mockingbird

Union! Our Salute to Public Employees:

- Brothers on the Line
- With Babies and Banners: Story of the Women's Emergency Brigade

100th Birthday Celebration of Roy Rogers:

- Don't Fence Me In
- Under Western Stars — Founders Prize for Best Classic Film

Tribute to Jafar Panahi:

- The White Balloon

Lost Gems:

- The Front
- One, Two, Three

Special Screenings:

- The Blob
- Habanastation — Founders Prize for Best of Fest
- Here Comes Trouble Book Reading — Mike's Surprise
- Two Spirits

Kids Fest:

- A Cat in Paris
- Kooky
- Mia and the Migoo
- Shorts for Kids
- Twigson

Dangerous Docs:

- Battle for Brooklyn
- Being Elmo: A Puppeteer's Journey — Audience Award for Best Documentary
- Bill Cunningham New York
- Cave of Forgotten Dreams
- Conan O'Brien Can't Stop
- An Encounter with Simone Weil — Special Founders Prize
- Exporting Raymond
- Fordson: Faith, Fasting, Football — Best US Documentary, Jury
- Give Up Tomorrow — Best Activism in a World Documentary, Jury
- Gnarr — Founders Prize for Best World Documentary Film/Best Direction in a World Documentary, Jury
- Granito: How to Nail a Dictator — Founders Prize for Best World Documentary Film
- Hot Coffee
- How to Start Your Own Country
- If a Tree Falls: A Story of the Earth Liberation Front — Founders Prize for Best US Documentary Film
- Kumaré
- L'amour fou
- The Loving Story
- Nuremberg: Its Lesson for Today: The Schulberg/Waletzky Restoration
- PressPausePlay
- Project Nim — Best World Documentary, Jury
- Semper Fi: Always Faithful — Special Founders Prize
- Shut Up, Little Man! An Audio Misadventure
- The Swell Season
- When the Drum Is Beating
- Where Soldiers Come From — Founders Prize for Best US Documentary Film
- Windfall
- You've Been Trumped

Experimental Film:

- Antoine
- Traces of a Diary
- Vapor Trail (Clark)
- Visionaries
- The White Meadows

Midnight:

- Bellflower
- Deadheads — Founders Prize for Best Horror Film
- Rabies
- Shorts for Midnight
- Trollhunter

Kids Fest:

- A Cat in Paris
- Kooky
- Mia and the Migoo
- Shorts for Kids
- Twigson

Shorts Programs:

- Short Animation
- Short Documentaries
- Shorts by Students
- Shorts by U of M Students
- Shorts for Adults I
- Shorts for Adults II
- Shorts for Kids
- Shorts for Midnight

Free Movies at the Open Space:

- The Dark Knight — People's Choice Winner
- Mr. Deeds Goes to Town
- Mrs. Doubtfire
- The Empire Strikes Back
- Tangled

=== 2012 ===
The eighth annual festival was held from July 31 - August 5, 2012. Michigan Filmmaker Award went to Winsor McCay.

Opening & Closing Night and Centerpiece Screenings:

- Beasts of the Southern Wild
- Searching for Sugar Man
- The Zen of Bennett

Hollywood Sneak Previews:

- The Campaign
- Hit & Run

Friends Only Screenings:

- BURN
- The Intouchables

Susan Sarandon Tribute:

- Robot and Frank
- The Rocky Horror Picture Show
- Thelma & Louise

Wim Wenders Tribute:

- Buena Vista Social Club
- Wings of Desire
- Shorts - Wim Wenders

State Theatre Centennial Celebration:

- Blackmail
- Richard III
- A Trip to the Moon with The Extraordinary Voyage
- The Story of Film: An Odyssey — Stanley Kubrick Award for Bold and Innovative Filmmaking

Occupy the Cinema!:

- Ashes of America
- Poor America
- The Reluctant Revolutionary
- Shorts - Occupy Wall Street
- Tahrir: Liberation Square
- We Are Legion: The Story of the Hacktivists
- We Are Wisconsin

Women:

- Films from the Early Women's Health Movement
- Growing Up Female

US Indies:

- Bernie
- A Better Life
- Compliance
- First Winter
- The Giant Mechanical Man
- Liberal Arts
- Margaret Special Founders Prize
- Love, Sex and Missed Connections (Missed Connections) — Special Jury Prize – First Time Director
- On the Ice
- Red Flag
- Somebody Up There Likes Me
- Supporting Characters
- Take Shelter

New Foreign Cinema:

- Coriolanus
- Detective Dee and the Mystery of the Phantom Flame
- Freedom
- Graceland
- Headhunters
- Hysteria
- The Kid with a Bike
- London River
- Monsieur Lazhar
- Nova Zembla
- Oslo, August 31st
- Sleepless Night
- Turn Me On, Dammit!
- Whole Lotta Sole

Dangerous Docs:

- 5 Broken Cameras — Founders Prize for Best Picture
- Ai Weiwei: Never Sorry
- Bidder 70 — Founders Prize for Best American Film
- Big Boys Gone Bananas!* — 2nd Runner Up Audience Award Winner
- Code of the West
- Detropia — Special Jury Prize – American Film
- Dinotasia
- Don't Stop Believin': Everyman's Journey — Audience Award Winner
- Ethel — 1st Runner Up Audience Award Winner
- The Flat — Special Jury Prize – Foreign Film
- How to Survive a Plague
- Jiro Dreams of Sushi
- Journey to Planet X
- Louder Than Love: The Grande Ballroom Story
- Payback
- The Queen of Versailles
- The Revisionaries
- Scenes of a Crime
- Sexy Baby — Founders Prize for Best Film by a First Time Director (Jill Bauer and Ronna Gradus)
- Side by Side
- Stuck
- West of Memphis
- The World Before Her — Founders Prize for Best Foreign Film

Midnight:

- Jackpot
- Let the Bullets Fly
- The Raid: Redemption
- Shorts - Midnight
- V/H/S

Experimental Film at Dutmers:

- Bestiaire
- Indignados
- Into Great Silence
- An Oversimplification of Her Beauty

Special Screenings:

- The Dictator — Special Screening
- An Afternoon Stroll with Michael Moore — Mike's Surprise
- Up Heartbreak Hill
- The War of the Worlds

Kids Fest:

- Circus Dreams
- The Crocodiles
- Legends of Valhalla: Thor

Shorts Programs:

- Shorts - AAFF Michael Moore Award Winners
- Shorts - Documentaries 1
- Shorts - Documentaries 2
- Shorts - Fiction 1
- Shorts - Fiction 2
- Shorts - Kids
- Shorts - Midnight
- Shorts - Occupy Wall Street
- Shorts - Spike & Mike's New Generation Festival of Animation
- Shorts - Spike & Mike's Sick and Twisted Festival of Animation
- Shorts - U of M Student Films
- Shorts - Wim Wenders
- Shorts - Winsor McCay, Michigan Filmmaker Award Winner

Free Movies at the Open Space:

- Footloose — People's Choice Winner
- Rebel Without a Cause
- Star Trek II: The Wrath of Khan
- WALL-E
- When Harry Met Sally...

=== 2013 ===
The ninth annual festival was held from July 30 - August 4, 2013. Paul Feig was honored with the Michigan Filmmaker Award and Michael Apted with the Lifetime Achievement Award. Liana Liberato received the Discovery Award and Mark Cousins, Rob Epstein, and Jeffrey Friedman received the Visionary Award. The Festival added a new venue this year by renovating the former Con Foster Museum into a theater that was named Bijou by the Bay which opened in time for the 2013 Traverse City Film Festival.

Opening & Closing Night and Centerpiece Screenings:

- Austenland
- Blue Jasmine
- Elaine Stritch: Shoot Me

Documentary:

- The Act of Killing — Stanley Kubrick Award For Bold and Innovative Filmmaking
- A Band Called Death
- Big Easy Express
- Blackfish
- The Central Park Five
- Citizen Koch — Founders Prize Special Award
- Dirty Wars
- Documentary Secret Screening
- The Expedition to the End of the World
- Far from Afghanistan
- The First Movie
- Gideon's Army
- God Loves Uganda
- Good Garbage
- Gore Vidal: The United States of Amnesia — Audience Award Runner Up Best Documentary Film/Founders Prize Special Award
- The Human Scale
- Inequality for All — Audience Award Winner Best Documentary Film
- Mark Cousins Secret Screening
- Mistaken for Strangers — Founders Prize Special Award
- More Than Honey
- Our Nixon — Founders Prize for Best Documentary
- Pandora's Promise
- The Pervert's Guide to Ideology
- Propaganda — Founders Grand Prize for Best Film
- Red Obsession
- Remote Area Medical — Founders Prize for Best Documentary
- Room 237
- Teenage
- Terms and Conditions May Apply
- This Is What Winning Looks Like
- The Trials of Muhammad Ali
- TWA Flight 800
- War on Whistleblowers: Free Press and the National Security State

American:

- The East — Founders Prize for Best Drama
- The English Teacher
- Erased
- Fruitvale Station — Audience Award Winner Best American Film
- The Girl on the Train
- Killing Them Softly
- Lovelace
- Much Ado About Nothing
- Orenthal: The Musical
- The Pretty One
- Sunlight Jr.
- Trust — Audience Award Runner Up Best American Film
- Trust Me
- We're the Millers

State Theatre Centennial Celebration:

- The Last Days of Pompeii
- The Phantom of the Opera — with the Alloy Orchestra

Before the Code:

- Gold Diggers of 1933
- She Done Him Wrong

Michael Apted Tribute:

- 56 Up
- Up Series

Tribute to Paul Feig:

- The Heat

Foreign:

- Before Snowfall
- The Broken Circle Breakdown
- Bypass — Founders Prize for Best Comedy
- Dancing Queen
- Dragon
- Fanie Fourie's Lobola
- A Hijacking
- Into the White — Audience Award Runner Up Best Foreign Film
- Kon-Tiki — Founders Prize Special Award
- The Last Days
- No
- A Royal Affair
- Seven Psychopaths
- Starbuck — Audience Award Winner Best Foreign Film
- Superstar
- Süskind
- Wadjda — Roger Ebert Prize for Best Film by a First Time Filmmaker
- Will You Still Love Me Tomorrow?

Midnight:

- Cockneys vs Zombies — John Waters Prize for Best Midnight Film
- The History of Future Folk
- Journey to the West: Conquering the Demons
- The Shining
- UnHung Hero

Experimental Film at Dutmers:

- Suitcase of Love and Shame
- Your Day Is My Night — Buzz Wilson Prize for Best Experimental/Avant Garde Film

Special Screenings:

- Bowling for Columbine — Mike's Surprise
- Doug Loves Movies Podcast
- Maïna

Kids Fest:

- Moon Man
- The Painting — Audience Award Winner Best Kids Film
- Shorts for Kids
- Victor and the Secret of Crocodile Mansion

Friends Only Screenings:

- Sole Survivor
- The World is Ours — Founders Prize for Best Comedy

TCFF Shorts:

- The Battle of amfAR
- Short Documentaries 1
- Short Documentaries 2
- Short Narratives
- Shorts by Students
- Shorts by U of M Students
- Shorts for Kids
- Shorts for Midnight
- Waiting for Mamu — Audience Award Winner Best Documentary Short

Free Movies at the Open Space:

- Across the Universe
- Apollo 13 — People's Choice Winner
- Independence Day
- Pirates of the Caribbean: The Curse of the Black Pearl
- The Princess Bride
- Some Like It Hot

=== 2014 ===
The tenth annual festival was held from July 29 - August 3, 2014. Barbara Kopple was honored this year with the Mid-Life Achievement Award. The Buzz and Movies on a Boat were added as venues.

Opening & Closing Night and Centerpiece Screenings:

- La gran familia española
- Calvary
- Magic in the Moonlight

Documentary:

- 112 Weddings
- 1971'
- Al Helm: Martin Luther King in Palestine
- Bending the Light
- Bronx Obama
- The Case Against 8 — Audience Award Runner Up Best Documentary Film
- Casting By
- Dangerous Acts Starring the Unstable Elements of Belarus
- Dinosaur 13
- Don't Leave Me — Founders Prize Special Award
- Fed Up
- Finding Vivian Maier — Founders Prize Best Documentary
- A Goat for a Vote
- Happy Valley
- The Internet's Own Boy: The Story of Aaron Swartz — Founders Prize Special Award
- Ivory Tower
- Letters to Jackie: Remembering President Kennedy
- Life Itself — Founders Prize Special Award
- Love and Terror on the Howling Plains of Nowhere
- Meet the Patels — Audience Award Winner Best Documentary Film & Founders Grand Prize Best Film
- Mission Blue
- Mitt
- The Newburgh Sting — Founders Prize Special Award
- The Overnighters
- Point and Shoot
- Print the Legend
- Return to Homs
- Rich Hill — Founders Grand Prize Best Film
- Running from Crazy
- Silenced — Founders Prize Special Award
- Slow Food Story
- Supermensch: The Legend of Shep Gordon
- To Be Takei
- Two Raging Grannies
- The Unknown Known
- Virunga
- Walking Under Water

American:

- 5 to 7 — Audience Award Winner Best American Film
- Blue Ruin
- Boyhood
- Coherence
- Cold in July
- Fading Gigolo
- Hellion
- Land Ho!
- Life of Crime
- Love is Strange
- The One I Love
- Palo Alto
- Rubber Soul — Founders Prize Special Award
- Sister — Audience Award Runner Up Best American Film
- Summer of Blood
- Wild Canaries

State Theatre Centennial Celebration:

- Lonesome — with the Alloy Orchestra
- On Approval
- Tillie's Punctured Romance

Special Screenings:

- Bag of Rice
- An Evening with Larry Charles
- Mike's Surprise
- Doug Loves Movies Podcast
- LaDonna Harris: Indian 101
- Yesterday and Tomorrow in Detroit

Kids Fest:

- Pim & Pom: The Big Adventure
- Thunder and the House of Magic — Audience Award Winner Best Kids Film

Free Movies at the Open Space:

- Casablanca
- The Goonies
- Jaws
- Jurassic Park
- Star Wars: Episode IV - A New Hope — People's Choice Winner
- The Wizard of Oz

Foreign:

- The Bachelor Weekend
- Black Coal, Thin Ice
- Blind Dates
- Blue Is the Warmest Colour
- Child's Pose
- Chinese Puzzle
- A Coffee in Berlin
- Excuse My French
- Fishing Without Nets — Roger Ebert Prize for Best Film by a First Time Filmmaker
- A Five Star Life
- The German Doctor
- The Gilded Cage
- The Hunt — Audience Award Runner Up Best Foreign Film
- I Won't Come Back
- The Keeper of Lost Causes
- The Lunchbox
- Manos Sucias
- Manuscripts Don't Burn
- Omar — Founders Prize Best Drama
- One Chance — Audience Award Winner Best Foreign Film
- The Past
- Playing Dead
- Snowpiercer
- Stations of the Cross — Stanley Kubrick Award For Bold and Innovative Filmmaking
- Still Life
- The Volcano — Founders Prize Best Comedy

Free Movies at the Buzz:

- 10%: What Makes a Hero?
- 12-12-12
- 5 Broken Cameras
- The Broken Circle Breakdown
- Castaway on the Moon
- The Edukators
- Face to Face
- Fishtail
- Good Driver Smetana
- The Hand That Feeds
- Is the Man Who is Tall Happy?
- Keep On Keepin’ On
- La Maison de la Radio
- The Lab
- Men at Work
- Please Vote for Me
- Profit motive and the whispering wind
- Storied Streets
- Troubled Water
- Web Junkie
- West Bank Story

Midnight:

- The Babadook
- The Canal
- Creep
- The Samurai
- The Benson Movie Interruption: Road House
- Zombeavers

Experimental Film at Dutmers:

- Focus on Infinity
- The Forgotten Space
- Karpotrotter
- Purgatorio: A Journey Into the Heart of the Border

Friends Only Screenings:

- Divide in Concord
- Human Capital

TCFF Shorts:

- Short Documentaries
- Short Experimental Films
- Short Narratives 1
- Short Narratives 2
- Shorts by MSU Students
- Shorts by U of M Students
- Shorts for Kids 1
- Shorts for Kids 2
- Shorts for Midnight
- Shorts from the Ann Arbor Film Festival

=== 2015 ===
The eleventh annual festival was held from July 28 - August 2, 2015. Robert Altman received the Visionary Award, Michigan Filmmaker Award went to Roger Corman, and Geraldine Chaplin received the Lifetime Achievement Award. The Woz interactive gallery was a new addition this year.

Opening & Closing Night and Centerpiece Screenings:

- The End of the Tour
- Grandma

Documentary:

- 20 Years of Madness
- Amy
- The Armor of Light - Founders Prize Special Award
- Best of Enemies
- The Brainwashing of My Dad
- A Brave Heart: The Lizzie Velasquez Story - Audience Award Winner Best Documentary
- Breaking a Monster
- The Chinese Mayor
- A Courtship
- A Dangerous Game
- Deep Web
- The Diplomat
- Do I Sound Gay?
- National Lampoon: Drunk Stoned Brilliant Dead
- Fear Not the Path of Truth - Changemaker Award
- Finders Keepers - Founders Prize for Best Comedy
- From This Day Forward
- Glen Campbell: I'll Be Me
- Hip Hop-eration
- Holbrook/Twain: An American Odyssey
- Hot Type: 150 Years of the Nation
- The Hunting Ground - Audience Award Runner-Up Best Documentary
- Indian Point
- Life May Be
- Listen to Me Marlon - Founders Prize for Best Film
- Monty Python: The Meaning of Life
- Night Will Fall
- Peace Officer
- Poverty, Inc.
- Prescription Thugs
- Raiders!: The Story of the Greatest Fan Film Ever Made
- Red Army
- Roseanne for President! - Founders Prize Special Award
- The Salt of the Earth
- The State-Mafia Pact
- The Student Body
- (T)ERROR
- T-Rex - Roger Ebert Prize for Best Film by a First Time Filmmaker
- The Trials of Spring - Founders Prize Special Award
- Very Semi-Serious
- The Wanted 18 - Founders Prize for Best Documentary
- We Come as Friends
- The Wolfpack - Founders Prize Special Award

American:

- 7 Chinese Brothers - Founders Prize Special Award
- Digging for Fire
- Good Kill
- Kill the Messenger - Audience Award Winner Best American Film
- The Last Five Years - Founders Prize Special Award
- Learning to Drive - Audience Award Runner-Up Best American Film
- The Overnight
- Tangerine - Stanley Kubrick Award for Bold and Innovative Filmmaking
- When I Live My Life Over Again

State Theatre Centennial Celebration:

- Les Vampires
- The Son of the Sheik

Native American Matinee:

- Songs My Brothers Taught Me

Special Screenings:

- The Benson Movie Interruption: Top Gun
- Doctor Zhivago
- Documentary Now!
- Doug Loves Movies Podcast
- Dusty Stacks of Mom
- Jeff Garlin's Gem: The Old Dark House
- Mike's Surprise
- MSU Presents: (313) Choices
- No More Road Trips?
- Shaun the Sheep
- Yesterday and Tomorrow in Detroit 5

Kid's Fest:

- Fiddlesticks - Stuart J. Hollander Prize for Best Kids Film
- Minuscule: Valley of the Lost Ants —French César Winner for Best Animated Film

Foreign:

- The 100-Year-Old Man Who Climbed Out the Window and Disappeared - Audience Award Runner-Up Best Foreign Film
- Banana
- Cart
- Challat of Tunis - Discovery Award
- Clouds of Sils Maria
- The Connection
- The Crow's Egg
- Dark Places
- Diplomacy
- Force Majeure
- Gett: The Trial of Viviane Amsalem - Founders Prize Special Award
- Güeros
- Haemoo
- Labyrinth of Lies
- Love at First Fight
- Man Up
- Mommy
- Operation Arctic
- Out of Nature
- A Pigeon Sat on a Branch Reflecting on Existence
- Tangerines - Audience Award Winner Best Foreign Film
- Timbuktu
- Two Days, One Night - Founders Prize for Best Drama
- Virgin Mountain
- When Marnie Was There
- Wild Tales - Founders Prize Special Award

Midnight:

- The Benson Movie Interruption: Speed
- Life of Brian

Friends Only Screenings:

- 99 Homes
- Being Canadian

Robert Altman Tribute:

- Altman
- M*A*S*H
- Nashville

Roger Corman:

- Corman's Surprise
- Corman's World: Exploits of a Hollywood Rebel
- The Intruder
- The Masque of the Red Death

Orson Welles Centennial:

- F for Fake
- Touch of Evil

Avant Garde:

- Journey to the West - Buzz Wilson Prize for Best Avant-Garde Film
- Mountain Spirits
- The Owners
- Speculation Nation

The Sidebar:

- City of Gold
- Good Things Await
- King Georges
- Sergio Herman, Fucking Perfect

Free Movies at the Open Space:

- The Birdcage
- The Breakfast Club — People's Choice Winner
- Gravity
- The Great Dictator
- Guardians of the Galaxy
- The Lego Movie

TCFF Shorts:

- The Best Medicine
- Character Study
- Discipline - Founder's Prize Best Narrative Short
- Dusty Stacks of Mom - Founder's Prize Special Mention Short
- Films by Kenneth Anger
- Finding Yourself
- My Enemy, My Brother - Founder's Prize Best Documentary Short
- Off the Grid
- Peace Now
- Shorts by MSU Students
- Shorts by U of M Students
- Shorts for Kids 1
- Shorts for Kids 2
- Shorts from the Ann Arbor Film Festival
- Truth and Consequence
- WTF

=== 2016 ===
The twelfth annual Traverse City Film Festival was held from July 26–31, 2016. This year's festival celebrated the historic State Theatre's centennial year and honored female filmmakers by featuring films directed by women for every selection in the Official US Documentary and Fiction sections.

Opening & Closing Night and Centerpiece Screenings:

- Infinitely Polar Bear
- Tony Robbins: I Am Not Your Guru
- Concerto: A Beethoven Journey

US Official Selection: Documentary:

- All this Panic
- Audrie & Daisy
- The Black Panthers: Vanguard of the Revolution
- By Sidney Lumet
- The C Word - Roger Ebert Prize for Best US Documentary Film by a First Time Filmmaker
- Cameraperson - Founders Prize Best US Documentary
- The Champions
- Command and Control
- Death by Design
- Democrats
- Do Not Resist
- Equal Means Equal - Audience Award Winner for Best US Documentary
- Florence, Arizona
- Generation Startup
- Gleason
- Hooligan Sparrow
- Jeremiah Tower: The Last Magnificent
- The Last Laugh
- Life, Animated
- Men of Sparta
- MSU Presents: Sorta Late
- Norman Lear: Just Another Version of You - Founders Prize Special Award
- Obit
- Olympic Pride, American Prejudice
- The Pistol Shrimps
- Rosenwald
- Solitary
- Territorio
- Trapped - Founders Prize Special Award
- Two Trains Runnin' - Men Make Movies Award
- Unlocking the Cage - Founders Prize Best US Documentary
- Walk With Me: The Trials of Damon J. Keith
- Weiner

US Official Selection: Narrative

- The 33
- Certain Women
- The Diary of a Teenage Girl
- Echo Park
- Embers
- Equity
- Five Nights in Maine
- Maggie's Plan - Founders Prize Best US Fiction
- My Blind Brother - Audience Award Winner for Best US Fiction
- Operator - Roger Ebert Prize for Best US Fiction Film by a First Time Filmmaker
- Women Who Kill

Foreign Official Selection: Documentary:

- Censored Voices
- Confusion
- Cooking up a Tribute
- Dark Horse
- Disturbing the Peace - Founders Prize Best Foreign Documentary, Audience Award Winner for Best Foreign Documentary
- Eat that Question: Frank Zappa in His Own Words
- Elephant's Dream
- The Event
- Francofonia
- Heart of a Dog
- Houston, We Have a Problem!
- I Am Belfast - Stanley Kubrick Award for Bold and Innovative Filmmaking
- Ice and the Sky
- Kings of Kallstadt - Roger Ebert Prize for Best US Fiction Film by a First Time Filmmaker
- Lo and Behold, Reveries of the Connected World
- Magnus
- Noma: My Perfect Storm
- Presenting Princess Shaw
- Reset

Foreign Official Selection: Narrative

- 3000 Nights
- Adult Life Skill
- The Brand New Testament
- The Club
- A Conspiracy Of Faith
- Dheepan
- El Clasico - Founders Prize Best Foreign Fiction
- The Last Reel - Founders Grand Prize Best Film
- A Man Called Ove - Audience Award Winner for Best Foreign Fiction
- Marguerite
- Mustang
- My Golden Days
- My Internship in Canada
- One Wild Moment
- Parents
- Sand Storm - Roger Ebert Prize for Best Foreign Fiction Film by a First Time Filmmaker
- Sing Street
- Son of Saul
- Taxi - Founders Prize Special Award
- Viva
- Welcome to Norway
- Women in Oversized Men's Shirts

Avant Garde:

- Elephant's Dream - Buzz Wilson Prize for Best Avant Garde Film
- The Event
- Heart of a Dog
- Sixty Six
- Territorio

Free Movies at The Open Space:

- Adam's Rib
- Frozen
- Jurassic World
- Pitch Perfect
- Shrek - People's Choice Winner
- Wayne's World

Friends Only Screenings:

- Midsummer in Newton
- Sweet Smell of Spring

July 28, 2016- A Day in History:

- The Doug Benson Movie Interruption: Kisses for my President
- Live - Hillary Clinton Acceptance Speech

Kid's Fest:

- Phantom Boy
- Oddball - Stuart J. Hollander Prize for Best Kids Film

Lost Gems of 2015

- Dope
- Suffragette

Men Make Movies- The Struggle Continues

- Command and Control
- Folk Hero & Funny Guy - Men Make Movies Award
- The Phenom - Men Make Movies Award
- The Pistol Shrimps - Men Make Movies Award
- Tony Robbins: I Am Not Your Guru

Michiganders Make Movies:

- Do Not Resist
- Generation Startup
- Men of Sparta

Midnight:

- Here Alone
- The Doug Benson Movie Interruption: A Donald Trump Favorite- Bloodsport
- The Doug Benson Movie Interruption: Kisses For My President

Premieres:

- Gleason
- Hell or High Water
- Little Boxes
- Men of Sparta
- Sister Cities
- Walk with Me: The Trials of Damon J. Keith

The Sidebar: Food on Film:

- Cooking Up A Tribute
- Jeremiah Tower: The Last Magnificent
- Noma: My Perfect Storm

State Theatre Centennial Celebration

- Blow Up
- Chimes at Midnight
- Citizen Kane
- Civilization
- Man with a Movie Camera (With the Alloy Orchestra)
- Meet John Doe
- Who's Afraid of Virginia Woolf?

Special Screenings:

- Doug Loves Movies Podcast
- Native American Manitee: Te Ata
- Where to Invade Next

#tween:

- Dark Horse
- Hunt for the Wilderpeople
- Ice and the Sky

TCFF Shorts:

- Shorts by MSU Students
- Shorts by U-M Students
- Shorts: Animated at the Ann Arbor Film Festival
- Shorts for All Kids
- Shorts for Kids 4+
- Shorts: Art
- Best of Fests
- Breaking Curfew
- Fish out of Water
- Friends Indeed
- It's Complicated
- Love & Marriage & Baby Carriage
- Strange Planet

=== 2017 ===
The thirteenth annual Traverse City Film Festival was held from July 25–30, 2017. This year’s festival celebrated works from filmmakers all around the world, especially those from countries targeted by the US travel ban. 19 directors could not attend the festival due to the ban, but Skyped into festival screenings to discuss their work. Mariska Hargitay, Noel Wells, Leonard Maltin, and Gilbert Gottfried were added to TCFF Walk of Fame this year.

Opening & Closing Night and Centerpiece Screenings:

- I, Daniel Blake
- Step
- Detroit

US Official Selection: Documentary:

- 12th and Clairmount
- Abacus: Small Enough to Jail
- Acorn and the firestorm
- Alphago
- Bending the Arc
- Bill Nye: Science Guy
- The Blood is at the Doorstep
- Chasing Coral
- City of Ghosts
- The Death and Life of Marsha P. Johnson
- Elián
- Flames
- Frank Serpico
- Gilbert
- I am Evidence
- I Am Not Your Negro
- Icarus
- Long Strange Trip
- Quest
- Rancher, Farmer, Fisherman
- Stranger Fruit
- True Conviction
- What Lies Upstream

US Official Selection: Narrative

- Barry
- Brigsby Bear
- Gook
- Infinity Baby
- Landline
- Mr. Roosevelt
- Paris Can Wait
- Patti Cake$
- War Machine

Foreign Official Selection: Documentary:

- Ada for Mayor
- All Governments Lie: Truth, Deception and the Spirit of I. F. Stone
- Cause of Death: Unknown
- The Chocolate Case
- Fire at Sea
- Pecking Order
- A River Below
- Rumble: The Indians Who Rocked the World

Foreign Official Selection: Narrative

- After the Storm
- Afterimage
- At the End of the Tunnel
- The Distinguished Citizen
- The Divine Order
- Drone
- Elle
- Farewell - Founders Grand Prize Best Film
- Gemma Bovery
- Graduation
- The Handmaiden
- The Hippopotamus
- Ice Mother
- Julietta
- Junction 48
- The King's Choice
- Manifesto
- Mr. Long
- Neruda
- Newton
- The Oath
- One Week and a Day
- Rock'n Roll
- Things to Come
- Tom of Finland
- Toni Erdmann
- The Trip to Spain
- Truman
- The Wedding Plan
- The Women's Balcony
- The Young Karl Marx

Avant Garde:

- Austerlitz
- The Challenge
- Inaate/Se/It Shines it a Certain Way. To a certain place./It Flies. Falls./
- Machines
- Stockholm, My Love

Free Movies at The Open Space:

- La La Land
- Moana
- Snow White and the Seven Dwarfs
- Star Wars: The Force Awakens
- Stop Making Sense
- Talladega Nights: The Ballad of Ricky Bobby
- What About Bob?

Friends Only Screenings:

- King of Peking
- The Work

Travel Ban

- Beats of the Antonov
- City of Ghosts
- Fishing Without Nets
- Libya in Motion
- A New Day in Old Sana'a
- Nowhere to Hide
- The Salesman

Student Screenings

- MSU Presents: Stay With Me
- CMU Presents: The Climb

Kid's Fest:

- Into the Who Knows!
- Revolting Rhymes

Midnight:

- Attack of the Lederhosen Zombies
- Doug Benson Movie Interruption: Starship Troopers
- Raw
- Vampire Cleanup Department

Premieres:

- Gleason
- Hell or High Water
- Little Boxes
- Men of Sparta
- Sister Cities
- Walk with Me: The Trials of Damon J. Keith

The Sidebar: Food on Film:

- Dinner in Abruzzo/Knife Skills
- First Growth
- New Chefs on the Block
- Soul
- Wasted! The Story of Food Waste

Special Screenings:

- Awake, A Dream from Standing Rock
- Cool Hand Luke
- Doug Loves Movies
- Mike's Surprise
- Reservoir Dogs
- Speedy with the Alloy Orchestra
- To Be or Not to Be

#tween:

- Fanny's Journey
- My Life as a Zucchini
- The Red Turtle
- Swallows and Amazons

TCFF Shorts:

- Shorts by MSU Students
- Shorts by U-M Students
- Shorts for All Kids
- Shorts for Kids 4+
- Best of Luck With the Wall
- Commodity City
- Cop Dog
- Hot Winter: A Film By Dick Pierre
- In a Nutshell
- Iron Hands
- Moom
- All the World's A Stage
- Fork in the Road
- Inside Flint
- Trip Abroad

=== 2018 ===
The 14th annual Traverse City Film Festival was held from July 31 - August 5, 2018. Jane Fonda, Dick Cavett, and Leon Vitali were added to TCFF Walk of Fame this year, and Nick Offerman was able to Skype in for the screening of Hearts Beat Loud. Jane Fonda received the Lifetime Achievement Award. The TCFF Student U program was launched this year.

Opening & Closing Night and Centerpiece Screenings:'

- RBG
- Burden
- Hearts Beat Loud

US Official Selection: Documentary

- Ali & Cavett: The Tale of the Tapes
- Arthur Miller: Writer
- Bathtubs Over Broadway
- Bisbee ‘17
- Bombshell: The Hedy Lamarr Story
- The Cold Blue / The Memphis Belle
- Cracked Up: The Darrell Hammond Story
- Crime + Punishment
- Filmworker
- Freaks and Geeks: The Documentary
- Hal
- Hillbilly
- Hitchcock/Truffaut
- Jane Fonda in Five Acts
- Minding the Gap
- A Murder in Mansfield
- One of Us
- Roll Red Roll
- The Russian Five
- Say Her Name: The Life and Death of Sandra Bland
- The Sentence
- Stranger Fruit
- Time for Ilhan
- Water & Power: A California Heist
- White Tide: The Legend of Culebra
- Won't You Be My Neighbor
- Wrestle

US Official Selection: Narrative

- Blaze
- Diane
- Hostiles
- Leave No Trace
- The Long Dumb Road
- The Miseducation of Cameron Post
- Nancy
- Never Goin' Back
- Night Comes On
- Puzzle
- Relaxer
- The Seagull
- Support The Girls
- Woman Walks Ahead

Foreign Official Selection: Narrative

- 1945
- And Breathe Normally
- The Captain
- The Death of Stalin
- Disobedience
- Family Heist
- A Fantastic Woman
- The Guilty
- How to Talk to Girls at Parties
- In the Fade
- The Insult
- Let The Sunshine In
- Luba
- Mary Goes Round
- The Other Side of Hope
- Smuggling Hendrix
- The Square
- Streaker
- Zama

Foreign Official Selection: Documentary

- The Eyes of Orson Welles
- Faces Places
- Hitler's Hollywood
- Last Men in Aleppo
- Loving Vincent
- McQueen
- Our New President
- Perfect Bid: The Contestant Who Knew Too Much
- Pope Francis: A Man of His Word
- Sea Sorrow
- The Silence of Others

Free Movies at The Open Space:

- Stop Making Sense
- Jumanji: Welcome to the Jungle
- 9 to 5
- The Greatest Showman
- Ferris Bueller's Day Off
- Black Panther
- Coco

Friends Only Screenings:

- Amateurs
- Skid Row Marathon

Student Screenings

- MSU Presents: Crandies
- Shorts by CMU Students
- Shorts by MSU Students
- Shorts by U-M Students

Kid's Fest:

- Jim Button and Luke the Engine Driver
- Maya the Bee: The Honey Games
- Shorts for All Kids
- Shorts for Kids 6+

Midnight:

- Anna and the Apocalypse
- Doug Benson Movie Interruption: Twister
- Ruin Me
- Shorts AF

Food on Film:

- Back to Burgundy
- Brewmaster
- Chef Flynn
- The Heat: A Kitchen (R)evolution
- The Quest of Alain Ducasse

Special Screenings:

- The Atomic Cafe
- Coming Home
- Doug Loves Movies Podcast
- Mike's Surprise
- Julia
- Mino Bimaadiziwin
- Something Wild
- Swimming to Cambodia
- Warrior Women

#tween:

- Supa Modo
- Youth Unstoppable

TCFF Shorts Programs:

- Shorts on Shuffle I
- Shorts on Shuffle II
- The Future is Shorts
- Shorts Save America

=== 2019 ===
The 15th annual Traverse City Film Festival was held from July 30 - August 3, 2019. Lily Tomlin received the Lifetime Achievement Award.

Opening & Closing Night and Centerpiece Screenings:

- Brittany Runs a Marathon (Opening night)
- After the Wedding
- Blinded by the Light

== Notable filmmakers and guests ==
- Jon Alpert
- Michael Apted
- Mary Badham
- Zal Batmanglij
- Kristen Bell
- Joe Berlinger
- Tom Bernard
- Rich Brauer - Michigan Filmmaker Award 2009
- Richard Brooks
- Jonathan Caouette
- Dick Cavett
- Geraldine Chaplin - Lifetime Achievement Award 2015
- Larry Charles
- Bill Couturie
- Jeff Daniels - Michigan Filmmaker Award 2006
- Carl Deal
- Kirby Dick
- Phil Donahue
- Stanley Donen
- Mark Dornford-May
- Lena Dunham
- Chaz Ebert
- Paul Eenhoorn
- Ari Emanuel
- Rob Epstein
- Paul Feig - Michigan Filmmaker Award 2013
- JJ Feild
- Jane Fonda - Lifetime Achievement Award 2018
- Jeffrey Friedman
- Jeff Garlin
- Terry George
- Alex Gibney
- Josh Gilbert
- Gilbert Gottfried
- Wavy Gravy
- Sabina Guzzanti
- Mani Haghighi
- Jan Harlan
- Chris Hegedus
- Kent Jones
- Jake Kasdan
- Rory Kennedy
- Brian Knappenberger
- Barbara Kopple - Mid-Life Achievement Award 2014
- Emily Kunstler
- Christine Lahti - Michigan Filmmaker Award 2007
- David Lascher
- Tia Lessin
- Victor Levin
- Liana Liberato
- Thomas Lynch
- Malcolm MacDowell
- Madonna
- Brit Marling
- Paul Mazursky
- Country Joe McDonald
- Matthew Modine
- Gretchen Mol
- Michael Moore
- Tom Morello
- Jesse Moss
- Patton Oswalt
- D.A. Pennebaker
- Bill Plympton
- Thom Powers
- Rebecca Reynolds
- Jay Roach
- David O. Russell
- Susan Sarandon
- Dan Schechter
- Yoav Shamir
- Charlie Siskel
- Ellen Spiro
- Ben Steinbauer
- Robert Stone
- Elaine Stritch
- Wes Studi
- Michael Stuhlbarg
- Rob Tapert
- Christopher Trumbo
- Leon Vitali
- Andrew Wagner
- Wim Wenders

== Board members ==
- Michael Moore: Founder, President
- Tia Lessin: Vice President
- Rod Birleson: Secretary
- Mark Cousins
- Larry Charles
- Jeff Daniels
- Terry George
- Christine Lahti
- Tom Morello

== Staff ==
- Festival Co-Directors: Susan Fisher and Meg Weichman
