= Babi Yar (disambiguation) =

Babi Yar is a ravine in Kyiv and a site of a World War II massacre of 33,771 Jews.

Babi Yar may also refer to:

- Babi Yar: A Document in the Form of a Novel, a book by Anatoly Kuznetsov
- Babiy Yar (film), a film by Jeff Kanew
- Babi Yar. Context, a 2021 documentary film by Sergei Loznitsa
- Babi Yar (poem), a poem by Yevgeny Yevtushenko
  - Symphony No. 13 (Shostakovich) or Babi Yar, a symphony by Shostakovich based on the poem
