= Filip Remunda =

Czech filmmaker (born 1973)

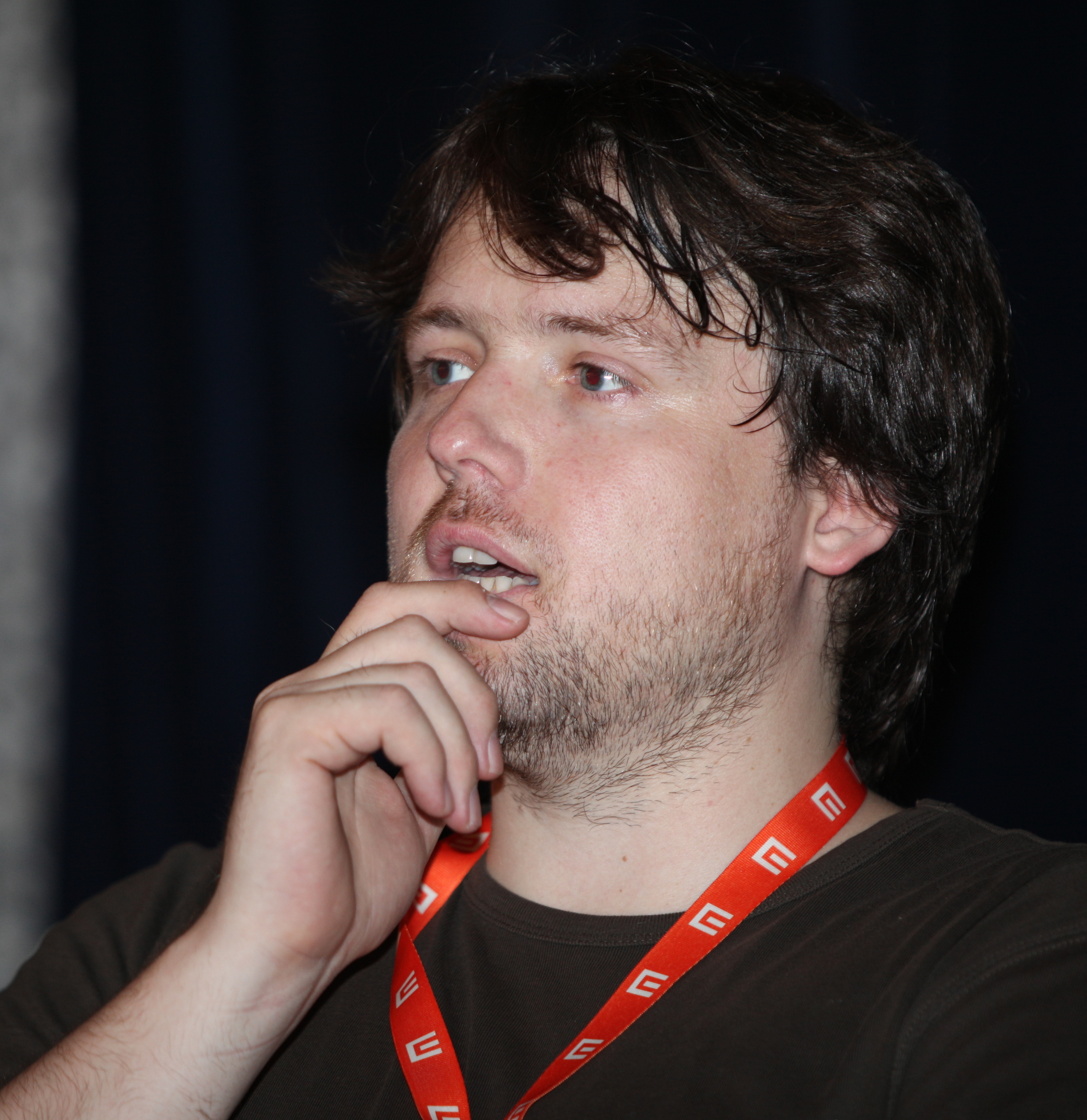
- Filip Remunda (2010)
- Born: May 5, 1973 (age 51); Prague, Czechoslovakia
- Years active: 1999 - present

Filip Remunda (born 1973 in Prague, Czechoslovakia) is a Czech film director, cinematographer and producer. He is best known for co-directing the 2004 documentary comedy Czech Dream (Czech: Český sen).

== Biography ==
Remunda graduated from the documentary film department of the Film and TV School of the Academy of Performing Arts in Prague (FAMU) in 2005, in the masterclass of Karel Vachek. His film, Village B., was named best documentary film at the 2002 Karlovy Vary International Film Festival and at the 2003 FAMU Festival, and received the Don Quixote Award at the 2003 Art Film Trenčianske Teplice festival, as well as several other prizes at festivals in Europe and the United States. During his studies, Remunda also attended a workshop at the Sam Spiegel Film and Television School in Jerusalem.

Together with Vit Klusak he directed the comedy documentary feature Czech Dream, and runs Hypermarket Film Ltd., an independent production company based in Prague. Czech Dream won multiple awards in film festivals around the world, including Best Documentary awards from the 2004 Aarhus Film Festival, the 2005 San Francisco International Film Festival, and the 2005 Traverse City Film Festival, as well as a Best Director Award for Remunda from the 2005 Zolotoy Vityaz Čeljabinsk in Russia.

He is co-founder of the Institute of Documentary Film (IDF), which supports the promotion of Eastern European films, and lectures at the Ex Oriente Film, an international documentary development workshop organized by IDF.

== Selected filmography ==
- 1999 - New Names for Old Friends, What Ever Production
- 1999 - Hilary and Chris on the Way, FAMU, Czech Television
- 2002 - Village B., FAMU, Czech Television
- 2003 - A.B.C.D.T.O.P.O.L., Simply Cinema, CT
- 2004 - Czech Dream, together with Vit Klusak, Hypermarket Film, Czech Television, Studio Mirage, FAMU
- 2007 - Film Encounters, Jihlava International Documentary Film Festival
- 2007 - The Tadpole, The Rabbit and the Holy Ghost, Czech Television - (Jihlava IDFF 2007 Audience Award, Pavel Koutecky Award for the Best Czech Authorial Dox of 2007)
- 2010 - Czech Peace, together with Vit Klusak
