= Sergei Loznitsa =

Ukrainian film director and screenwriter (born 1964)

- Сергей Лозница
- Loznitsa in 2018
- Born: 5 September 1964 (age 62); Baranovichi, Byelorussian SSR, Soviet Union (now Belarus)
- Occupation: Filmmaker
- Years active: 1996–present
- Website: www.loznitsa.com

Sergei Vladimirovich Loznitsa (Note: Russian: Сергей Владимирович Лозница; Belarusian: Сяргей Уладзімеравіч Лазьніца, romanized: Siarhiej Uładzimieravič Laźnica) (born 5 September 1964) or Serhii Volodymyrovych Loznytsia, (Note: Ukrainian: Сергій Володимирович Лозниця) is a Ukrainian filmmaker of Belarusian origin. He is most known for his archival footage documentaries about Soviet Union history, and for his slow cinema dramatic films.

His feature films My Joy (2010), In the Fog (2012), A Gentle Creature (2017), and Two Prosecutors (2026), were nominated for the Palme d'Or at the Cannes Film Festival. While his documentaries The Event (2015), State Funeral (2019), and Babi Yar. Context (2021), received critical acclaim.

== Early life ==
Loznitsa was born on 5 September 1964 in the city of Baranavichy, in the Byelorussian Soviet Socialist Republic. Later, the Loznitsa family moved to Kyiv, Ukrainian Soviet Socialist Republic, where he completed high school.

Loznitsa graduated from Kyiv Polytechnic Institute as a mathematician in 1987. Between 1987 and 1991, he worked at the Institute of Cybernetics, where he developed expert systems, systems of design-making and artificial intelligence. Loznitsa also worked as a translator from Japanese.

In 1991, he enrolled at the Gerasimov Institute of Cinematography, in the fictional-film direction department taught by Nana Jorjadze. He graduated with honors in 1997.

== Career ==
Loznitsa began working as a documentary film director in Saint Petersburg in 2000. In 2007, Loznitsa travelled to Canada to participate in the first retrospective of his films at Media City Film Festival, representing his first in person visit to North America. This screening and lecture included many of the director's lesser-known short films focussing on his intimate depictions of the former Soviet Europe, including Halt (2000), Portrait (2002), and Factory (2004). Many of Loznitsa's films had North American premieres at Media City Film Festival, including Blockade (2005), Artel (2006), Revue (2008), The Letter (2012) and others before the director began to gain international prominence with major screenings at TIFF, NYFF and elsewhere.

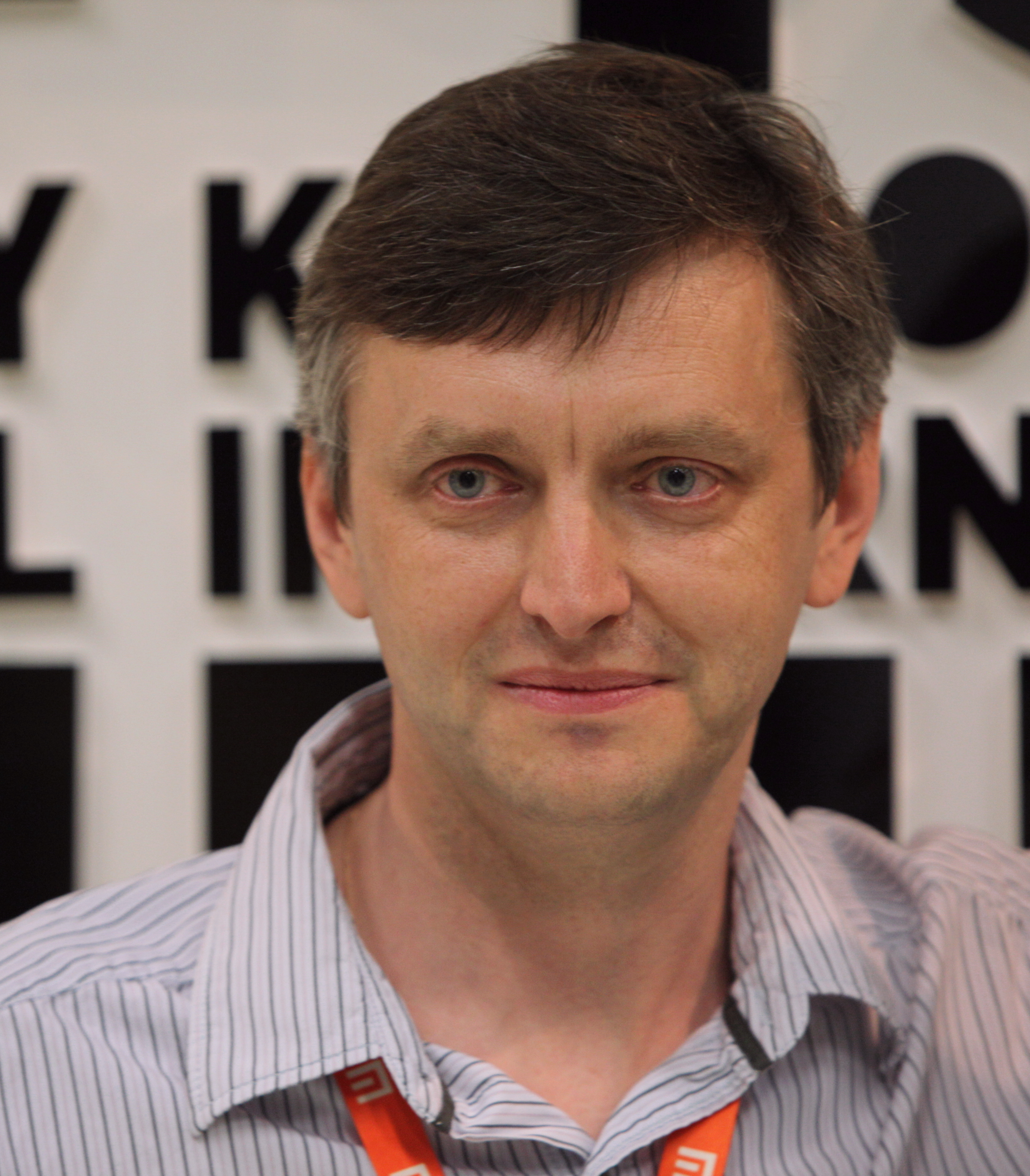
Loznitsa in 2010

In 2010, his film My Joy was selected for the main competition at the 2010 Cannes Film Festival. His 2012 film, In the Fog, competed for the Palme d'Or at the 2012 Cannes Film Festival. Maidan had its world premiere in a special screening at Cannes in May 2014, and was a record of the 2013–14 popular protests in Kyiv and their violent suppression. His documentary "Babi Yar. Context" was created with help from Babi Yar Holocaust Memorial Center.

In 2025, his Two Prosecutors had its world premiere at the main competition of the 78th Cannes Film Festival, where it was nominated for the Palme d'Or and won François Chalais Prize. It follows a young Soviet prosecutor seeking justice for a political prisoner during Joseph Stalin's ongoing Great Purge.

== Personal life ==
He and his family moved to Germany in 2001.

=== Political views ===
On 28 February 2022, Loznitsa resigned from the European Film Academy in response to its statement expressing "solidarity with Ukraine" published days earlier in response to the Russian invasion of Ukraine. In an open letter, Loznitsa condemned the academy for failing "to call a war a war, to condemn barbarity and voice your protest". On 1 March 2022, the academy announced that it would exclude Russian films from its European Film Awards. The same day, Loznitsa spoke against this decision, saying, "many friends and colleagues, Russian filmmakers, have taken a stand against this insane war... They are victims as we are of this aggression", and calling to "not judge people based on their passports" but "on their acts".

On 19 March 2022, the Ukrainian Film Academy announced Loznitsa's expulsion for opposing the boycott of Russian films. The academy stated that Loznitsa had "repeatedly stressed that he considers himself a cosmopolitan, 'a man of the world'. However, now, when Ukraine is struggling to defend its independence, the key concept in the rhetoric of every Ukrainian should be his national identity." Loznitsa issued a statement the same day, saying, "I was astonished to read of the Ukrainian film academy's decision to expel me for being a cosmopolite. ... It is only during the late Stalinist era, from the onset of the antisemitic campaign unleashed by Stalin between 1948 and 1953, that the term acquired a negative connotation in Soviet propaganda discourse. By speaking out against cosmopolitanism, the Ukrainian 'academy members' employ this very discourse invented by Stalin". Loznitsa called the academy's emphasis on the national identity "Nazism" and a "gift to Kremlin propagandists". Loznitza believed Babi Yar. Context was a contributing factor, as it deals with Ukraine’s collaboration in the Nazi massacre of Jews at Babi Yar. Academy members, he said, "had a very different perception of Ukrainian history, which they claim they know better than anyone".

== Filmography ==
=== Feature films ===
Year	English title	Original title	Notes
2010	My Joy	Счастье мое	
2012	In the Fog	В тумане	
2017	A Gentle Creature	Лагідна / Кроткая	
2018	Donbass	Донбас / Донбасс	
2025	Two Prosecutors	Два прокурора	

=== Documentary films ===
Year	English title	Original title	Notes
2002	Portrait		
2005	Blockade	Блокада	
2009	Predstavleniye (Revue)	Представление	
2014	Maidan	Майдан	
2015	The Event	Событие	
2016	Austerlitz	Аустерлиц	
2018	The Trial	Процесс	
2018	Victory Day	День победы	
2019	State Funeral	Государственные похороны	
2021	Babi Yar. Context	Бабий Яр. Контекст	
2021	Mr. Landsbergis		
2022	The Natural History of Destruction		
2022	The Kiev Trial		
2024	The Invasion		
2026	Imperium		Post-production

== Awards and honours ==
- Kraków Film Festival, Bronze Dragon (Segodnya My Postroim Dom, 1996)
- Kraków Film Festival, Golden Dragon - Special Mention (Polustanok, 2000)
- International Short Film Festival Oberhausen, Grand Prize (Portret, 2002)
- Dok Leipzig, Silver Dove (Portret, 2002)
- Karlovy Vary International Film Festival, Best Documentary - Special Mention (Portret, 2003)
- Nika Award Best Documentary (Blokada, 2006)
- Kraków Film Festival, Golden Dragon (Blokada, 2006)
- Karlovy Vary International Film Festival, Best Documentary (Artel, 2007)
- Jihlava International Documentary Film Festival, Best Central and Eastern European Documentary (Artel, 2007)
- Kraków Film Festival, Golden Horn (Predstavlenie, 2008)
- Golden Apricot Yerevan International Film Festival, Silver Apricot - Special Prize (My Joy, 2010)
- Kinotavr, Best Direction (My Joy, 2010)
- Tallinn Black Nights Film Festival, Grand Prize (My Joy, 2010)
- Cannes Film Festival, FIPRESCI Award (In the Fog, 2012)
- Golden Apricot Yerevan International Film Festival, Golden Apricot (In the Fog, 2012)
- Kraków Film Festival, Golden Dragon (Pismo, 2013)
- Ann Arbor Film Festival, Michael Moore Award (The Event, 2016)
- Traverse City Film Festival, Buzz Wilson Prize (Austerlitz, 2016)
- Cannes Film Festival, Un Certain Regard Award for Best Director (Donbass, 2018)
- Cairo International Film Festival, Silver Pyramid (Donbass, 2018)
- 49th International Film Festival of India, Golden Peacock for Best Film (Donbass, 2018)
- 2025 – Loznitsa was appointed the jury president at the 31st Sarajevo Film Festival for Competition Programme – Feature Film.
