= State Funeral (2019 film) =

2019 film

- Directed by: Sergei Loznitsa
- Written by: Sergei Loznitsa
- Produced by: Sergei Loznitsa; Maria Choustova
- Edited by: Danielius Kokanauskis
- Production companies: Atoms & Void; Studio Uljana Kim; Nutprdukce; Current Time TV
- Distributed by: Cinema Prestige (Russia)
- Release dates: September 6, 2019 (Venice); November 22, 2019 (Lithuania)
- Running time: 135 minutes
- Countries: Netherlands; Lithuania
- Language: Russian
- Box office: $48,003

State Funeral (Russian: Государственные похороны, romanized: Gosudarstvennye pohorony) is a 2019 internationally co-produced documentary film by Ukrainian filmmaker Sergei Loznitsa. It examines the ceremony and aftermath of Joseph Stalin, dictator of the Union of Soviet Socialist Republics from 1929 to his death in 1953.

== Individuals shown in archive footage ==
- Joseph Stalin
- Lavrentiy Beria
- Nikita Khrushchev
- Georgy Malenkov
- Vyacheslav Molotov
- Nikolai Bulganin
- Klement Gottwald
- Bolesław Bierut
- Urho Kekkonen
- Zhou Enlai
- Valko Chervenkov
- Gheorghe Gheorghiu-Dej
- Mátyás Rákosi
- Walter Ulbricht
- Dolores Ibárruri
- Yumjaagiin Tsedenbal

== Release ==
State Funeral premiered at the 76th Venice International Film Festival on 6 September 2019, and the Toronto International Film Festival a week later on the 13th. It saw theatrical exhibition in Lithuania starting on 22 November 2019, and continued through film festivals and other territories before a limited release in the United States on 7 May 2021, before a streaming release on MUBI two weeks later, available also in Australia, Canada, Ireland, India, Latin America, New Zealand, Turkey and the United Kingdom.

== Reception ==
On review aggregator website Rotten Tomatoes, the film has an approval rating of 88% based on 26 reviews, with an average rating of 7.60/10. The website's critical consensus reads, "If State Funeral risks repetitiveness in its patient approach, the glimpse of history it offers remains a fascinating -- and frightening -- look at life under a totalitarian regime." Metacritic reports a weighted average score of 81 out of 100, based on 10 critics, indicating "universal acclaim".

| Award | Category | Recipient(s) | Result | Ref. |
|---|---|---|---|---|
| Docaviv International Documentary Film Festival | Depth of Field Competition | Sergei Loznitsa | Nominated | |
| Docaviv International Documentary Film Festival | Depth of Field Competition - Honorable Mention | Sergei Loznitsa | Won | |
| IndieLisboa International Independent Film Festival | Silvestre Award (Best Feature Film) | Sergei Loznitsa | Nominated | |
| National Lithuania Film Awards | Best Co-Production Film | Sergei Loznitsa; Atoms & Void | Nominated | |
| National Lithuania Film Awards | Audience Award | Sergei Loznitsa; Atoms & Void | Nominated | |
| National Lithuania Film Awards | Best Film Editing | Danielius Kokanauskis; Atoms & Void | Nominated | |
| National Lithuania Film Awards | Best Sound Mixing | Vladimir Golovnitskiy; Atoms & Void | Won | |
| Russian Guild of Film Critics | White Elephant (Best Documentary) | Sergei Loznitsa | Nominated | |
| 31st Stockholm International Film Festival | Bronze Horse | Sergei Loznitsa | Nominated | |
| Wiesbaden goEast | Best Documentary | Sergei Loznitsa | Won | |
