= Maidan (2014 film) =

Documentary film by Sergei Loznitsa

- Theatrical release poster
- Directed by: Sergei Loznitsa
- Produced by: Sergei Loznitsa; Maria Baker
- Cinematography: Sergei Loznitsa; Serhiy Stetsenko; Mykhailo Yelchev
- Edited by: Sergei Loznitsa; Danielius Kokanauskis
- Production companies: Atoms & Void
- Distributed by: United States: The Cinema Guild; France: ARP Sélection
- Release dates: 21 May 2014 (Cannes); 12 December 2014 (USA)
- Running time: 130 minutes
- Countries: Ukraine; Netherlands
- Language: Ukrainian

Maidan (Ukrainian: Майдан) is a 2014 documentary film, directed by Sergei Loznitsa. It focuses on the Euromaidan movement of 2013 and 2014 in Maidan Nezalezhnosti (Independence Square) in Ukraine's capital Kyiv. It was filmed during the protests and depicts different aspects of the revolution, from the peaceful rallies to bloody clashes between police and civilians.

The film premiered on May 21, 2014 at the 2014 Cannes Film Festival. It had a theatrical release in the United States on December 12, 2014.

== Synopsis ==
The film explores and follows the protests and violence in Kyiv's Maidan Nezalezhnosti (Independence Square) which lead to the overthrow of President Viktor Yanukovych.

== Releases ==
After its premiere at Cannes, the film had a theatrical release in France on May 23, 2014. The film was released in Ukraine on July 24, 2014. It had a limited release in US on December 12, 2014 before expanding world wide on February 20, 2015, which coincided with the date of the revolution in Ukraine. As of April 2018, the movie had not yet been shown in Russia.

== Reception ==
The film has received positive reception from critics. Review aggregator Rotten Tomatoes reports that 100% of 24 film critics have given the film a positive review, with a rating average of 7.91 out of 10. On Metacritic, which assigns a weighted mean rating out of 100 reviews from film critics, the film holds an average score of 86, based on 9 reviews, indicating a 'Universal acclaim' response.

Leslie Felperin of The Hollywood Reporter gave the film a positive review and said that "[t]his stunning, epic-scaled film harkens back to the heroic, journalistic roots of documentary-making and yet feels ineffably modern and formally daring." In his review for Variety, Jay Weissberg wrote that "In contrast with most documentaries made in the wake of an historic event, "Maidan" will last beyond the current Ukrainian upheaval to stand as compelling witness and a model response to a seminal moment too fresh to be fully processed." Lee Marshal, reviewing the film for Screen International, said that "[e]ven in the midst of the molotovs, Loznitsa's sincere and memorable document retains its fascination with those small details that make us human, and make democracy worth fighting for." Michael Atkinson of The Village Voice called it "Easily the most rigorous, vital, and powerful movie of 2014, Sergei Loznitsa's Maidan may be a perfect Bazinian cinema-machine - reality is captured, crystallized, honored for its organic complexity, and delivered unpoisoned by exposition or emphasis." Andrew Pulver, in a review for The Guardian, stated: "[i]n some ways it's perfect, in its Eisenstein-esque refusal to compromise on the idea of the crowd as the key participant. In other ways, though, its sternness hampers it."

Howard Feinstein of Filmmaker Magazine wrote that "Maidan is gorgeous if stark. It never crosses the line into aestheticizing the revolution, the suffering and brutality that come along with it. Its artfulness stems from obsessive precision. You register Maidan just as you do the well-known paintings of horror from, say, the Spanish Civil War and the French Revolution: Not an interpretation, but an artwork capturing the truth of a historic moment." Daniel Walber of Nonfics, called the film "a portrait of a people, a place and a moment rather than a dissertation on its context or implications. It is raw, unflinching cinema for a troubled nation in a great and terrible moment." Oleg Ivanov of Slant Magazine gave the film three out of four stars, writing that "[i]t puts the viewer inside Maidan, allowing them to draw their own conclusions about the ideas and agendas espoused by the movement's leaders and participants."

== Literature ==
- Lilya Kaganovsky Review of Maidan // Slavic Review. — 2015. — Vol. 74, iss. 4. — P. 894–895. — DOI:10.5612/slavicreview.74.4.894.
