= Czech Peace =

2010 Czech documentary film

- Directed by: Vít Klusák; Filip Remunda
- Written by: Vít Klusák; Filip Remunda
- Music by: Petr Marek
- Release date: 6 May 2010
- Running time: 100 minutes
- Country: Czechia
- Language: Czech

Czech Peace (Czech: Český mír) is a 2010 Czech documentary film directed by Vít Klusák and Filip Remunda. The film won the White Goose award at the DMZ International Documentary Film Festival in 2010. The film followed a 2004 documentary from the same pair of directors, Czech Dream (Český sen). Following the release of Czech Peace, the directors announced plans to make a third documentary film to complete a trilogy.
