= Bijou by the Bay =

Movie theater in Traverse City, Michigan, United States

Coordinates: 44.7656°N 85.6213°W

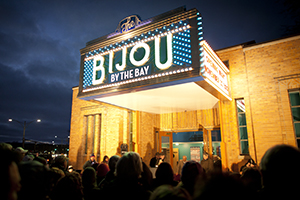
Bijou by the Bay 181 E. Grandview Parkway Traverse City MI 49684

The Bijou by the Bay (/biːˈʒuː/ bee-ZHOO) is a 150-seat nonprofit movie theater in a city park on Grand Traverse Bay in Michigan, next to the multi-use TART Trail. It is one of the venues for the Traverse City Film Festival.

== History ==
The first new movie theater to open within Traverse City city limits in over 63 years sits in the Con Foster Museum building, originally built by President Roosevelt's Civil Works Administration in the 1930s. The museum sat vacant for many years until it was renovated into a fully accessible, state-of-the-art movie theater in 2013 by the same team, led by Traverse City Film Festival president and founder Michael Moore, who resurrected the State Theatre in 2007. The renovation was made possible by a cornerstone donation from Richard and Diana Milock, the Bijou Founders, and hundreds of other individuals and community members who gave time and money to create a waterfront theater that has expanded the cinematic arts in Northern Michigan.

That the Bijou by the Bay resides in the former Con Foster Museum building is nothing less than serendipitous — Conrad Foster himself was manager of the State Theatre back when it was called the Lyric Theatre. Con Foster started his movie career at the age of 13 as an usher in Boston's Bijou Theatre. He moved to Traverse City in 1917 to run the Lyric, a job he continued until his death in 1940. He also served as head of the Chamber of Commerce, City Commissioner, and Mayor of what he called "the best little city in the world.” Transforming the defunct museum named in his honor into a cinema pays tribute to Traverse City's original movie house impresario and an accomplished civic leader who was dedicated to serving his community.

The Bijou by the Bay had its grand opening on July 29, 2013 just before the 9th Annual Traverse City Film Festival with a sneak preview showing of The Spectacular Now. This was an important addition to northern Michigan cinemas due to the deed restrictions on the State Theatre which could only show films that opened in less than 200 screens in the US.

Bijou is the French word for "little gem." The name was selected due to its popularities for movie theaters in the 1930s and 40s, the era in which the museum was constructed.

== Murals ==
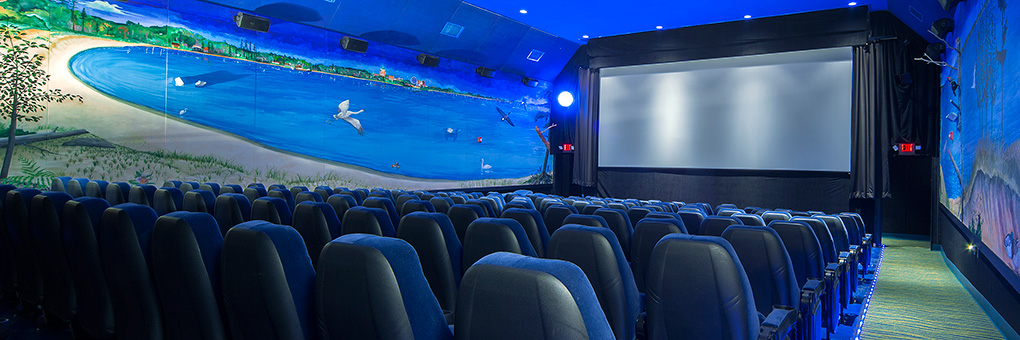
A mural inside Bijou by the Bay

The Bijou features murals painted by award-winning local artists Rufus Snoddy and Glen Wolff, who also painted the mural in the lobby of the State Theatre. The murals feature views of the shores of Lake Michigan on which the theater sits. Hidden in the painting, audience members can find several easter eggs that reference classic films and Michigan artifacts.
