= Blockade (2005 film) =

- Directed by: Sergei Loznitsa
- Release date: December 15, 2005 (Stalkerfest)
- Country: Russia
- Language: Silent film

Blockade is a 2005 documentary film by Sergei Loznitsa. The film was shot with no dialogue and consists of black and white footage shot during the Siege of Leningrad. It has a run time of 52 minutes.

== Plot ==
The life of the city, preparing for defense. Trenches in the squares, air defense measures: deployment of anti-aircraft artillery, balloons, light cloaking.

The first destruction from bombing, fires. Wounded and dead. Disassembly of the ruins. Newspapers, propaganda posters. The bulletin board on the sale or exchange of household utensils for cigarettes and food. Frozen on the streets icy transportation, sleds with the caked corpses. Bodies in the snow. Extraction of water from holes and ditches. Disassembling wooden buildings for firewood. The mass graves.

Victory. City festivities, festive salute, fireworks. Execution of German soldiers on the square.

== Reception ==
Blockade has a score of 70 out of 100 on Metacritic, based on 5 critics, indicating "generally favorable reviews".
