= In the Fog =

2012 film

- Theatrical release poster
- Russian: В тумане
- Directed by: Sergei Loznitsa
- Written by: Sergei Loznitsa
- Based on: In the Fog by Vasil Bykaŭ
- Produced by: Heino Deckert
- Starring: Vladimir Svirskiy
- Cinematography: Oleg Mutu
- Edited by: Danielius Kokanauskis
- Production companies: Belarusfilm; GP Cinema Company; Lemming Film; Ma.ja.de. Fiction; Rija Films
- Release dates: May 25, 2012 (Cannes); November 15, 2012 (Germany); November 22, 2012 (Russia)
- Running time: 127 minutes
- Countries: Belarus; Germany; Latvia; Netherlands; Russia
- Languages: Russian; German
- Budget: €2 million
- Box office: $194.594

In the Fog (Russian: В тумане) is a 2012 war drama film written and directed by Sergei Loznitsa. Adapted from Vasil Bykaŭ's short story of the same name, the film follows the partisans resistance in occupied Belarus during World War II.

The film had its world premiere at the main competition of the 65th Cannes Film Festival on 25 May 2012, winning the FIPRESCI Prize. At the 2012 Yerevan International Film Festival the film won the Golden Apricot for Best Feature Film.

== Plot ==
In 1942 in Belarus, during the German occupation, the Germans faced strong resistance from the partisans and the hatred of the local people. The partisans suspect Sushenya, a track walker, of collaboration with the Nazis, because he is the only one released from a group of workers who derailed a German train. Two of them capture Sushenya and lead him into the forest, where they plan to shoot him. They fall into a trap set by the Germans, who severely wound Burov, one of the partisans. Sushenya attempts to save his executioner's life by carrying the wounded partisan on his back to the nearest village. Nevertheless, Sushenya remains under suspicion. He laments that he was a well-respected and trustworthy village resident, raising a family in peace before the war changed that forever.

== Cast ==
- Vladimir Svirskiy as Sushenya
- Vladislav Abashin as Burov
- Sergei Kolesov as Voitik
- Nikita Peremotov as Grisha
- Kirill Petrov as Koroban
- Dmitriy Kolosov as Mishuk
- Stepans Bogdanovs as Topchievsky
- Dmitriy Bykovskiy-Romashov as Yaroshevich
- Igor Khripunov as Mirokha
- Yulia Peresild as Anelya
- Nadezhda Markina as Burov's Mother
- Vlad Ivanov as Grossmeier

== Reception ==
In the Fog has an approval rating of 87% on review aggregator website Rotten Tomatoes, based on 31 reviews, and an average rating of 7.1/10. The consensus on the site states, "While it treads familiar narrative ground -- and is a mite predictable at times -- In the Fog proves a smart, thought-provoking antidote to Hollywood action movies." Metacritic, which uses a weighted average, assigned the film a score of 78 out of 100, based on 15 critics, indicating "generally favorable" reviews.

Writing for The Guardian, Peter Bradshaw said it was "an intense, slow-burning and haunting drama."
