= Stranger Fruit (film) =

- Film poster
- Directed by: Jason Pollock
- Screenplay by: Jason Pollock
- Produced by: Jeremiah Younossi
- Cinematography: Beth Cloutier; Jason Pollock
- Edited by: Jason Pollock
- Music by: Dan Edinberg; Chris Zabriskie
- Production company: Boom
- Release dates: March 11, 2017 (SXSW); April 3, 2018 (United States)
- Running time: 95 minutes
- Country: United States
- Language: English

Stranger Fruit is a 2017 American documentary film about the 2014 shooting of Michael Brown by a Ferguson, Missouri police officer. The film showed previously unpublished surveillance video that director Jason Pollock alleges was concealed from jury members and the public in order to tarnish Brown's image.

Filmmaker Jason Pollock, spent two years filming to document civil unrest in Ferguson following the failed indictment of former Ferguson police officer Darren Wilson over charges in Brown's killing.

Stranger Fruit premiered March 11, 2017, at the South by Southwest festival in Austin, Texas. The film showed previously unreleased footage of Michael Brown visiting Ferguson Market about twelve hours before police were called after Brown assaulted the store's owner at the same location. In the footage Brown appears to trade clerks a small bag of drugs, asserted by Pollock to be marijuana, for store cigarillos. Jason Pollock said the video showed Brown returning the cigarillos to the clerks for safekeeping; thus rather than stealing merchandise later that day, Brown was leaving with cigarillos he believed he had paid for.

The clip was immediately disputed by Jay Kanzler, a lawyer for the convenience store, who said there was "no understanding," "[n]o agreement" between Brown and the store. Kanzler said, the clerks "didn't sell him cigarillos for pot," and that [Brown] returned the cigarillos because the employees refused to accept the marijuana as payment.

Protesters, believing claims the video was purposely withheld as part of a police cover-up, gathered outside Ferguson Market on March 12. Police arrested three people, including one man who allegedly attempted to set fire to a police cruiser. One officer was also injured.

St. Louis County's prosecuting office released unedited store surveillance footage March 13, which county Prosecuting Attorney Robert P. McCulloch said made it "very clear that there was no transaction between Mr. Brown and the store employees." Kanzler said Brown's attempted bargaining with the store clerks "was heated,” and ultimately rejected: the extended video appears to show clerks returned the small bag to Brown, which he then left with. The footage also showed a clerk returning Brown's attempted purchase to the shelf shortly after, which Kanzler said ruled out a trade.

Pollock defended the documentary's claims, and asserted “[t]he exchange is made. They kept the weed.” He further claimed “[t]he weed never goes back to [Brown]. We see that” in the footage.
