= Austerlitz (2016 film) =

2016 film

- Directed by: Sergei Loznitsa
- Written by: Sergei Loznitsa
- Release date: 7 September 2016 (Venice Film Festival)
- Country: Germany
- Language: German

Austerlitz is a 2016 German documentary film written and directed by Sergei Loznitsa. It premiered out of competition at the 73rd edition of the Venice Film Festival. It deals with the Holocaust by observing visitors at the Nazi concentration camps of Sachsenhausen and Dachau. The title is a hint at W.G. Sebald's Austerlitz novel.

== Plot ==
The plot of the movie is a black-and-white footage of tourists on the territory of museum complexes, former concentration camps that function as museums (Dachau, Ravensbrück, Sachsenhausen and Dora-Mittelbau). The tape is shot in a webcam format with medium close-ups - the camera is fixed at chest height and camouflaged so that people don't pay attention to it. Each scene lasts at least 5 minutes, with almost no museum exhibits in the frame, German, English, French, Spanish, Italian speech is heard. In general, most of the tourists look at, look at, take pictures, that is, they behave normally, but there are scenes in which the behavior of visitors can be considered incorrect and disrespectful.

== Reception ==
=== Critical response ===
Austerlitz has an approval rating of 91% on review aggregator website Rotten Tomatoes, based on 11 reviews, and an average rating of 6.83/10.
