= Babi Yar. Context =

2021 Ukrainian documentary film

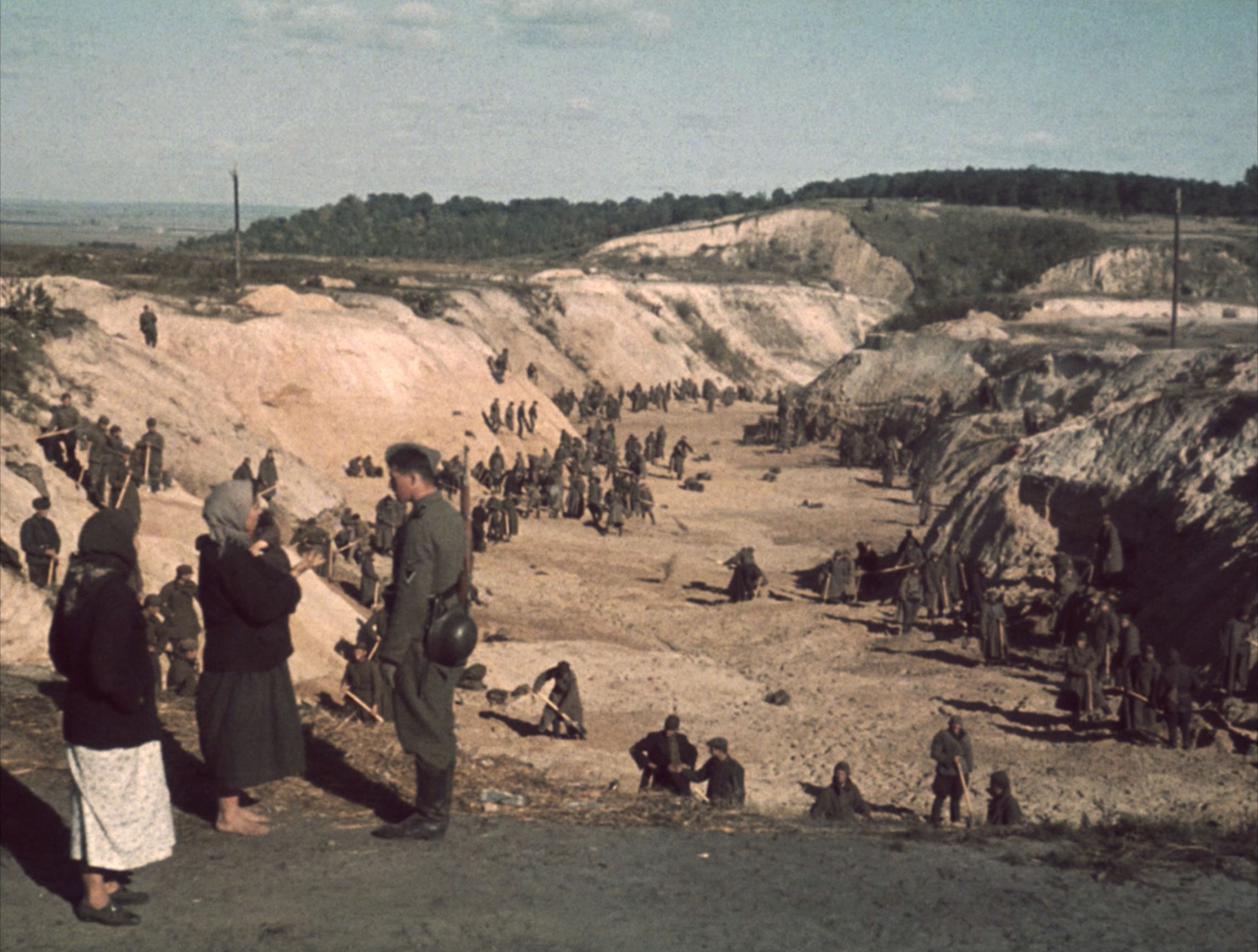
- Babi Yar after the massacre
- Directed by: Sergei Loznitsa
- Written by: Sergei Loznitsa
- Produced by: Maria Choustova; Ilya Khrzhanovsky
- Edited by: Sergei Loznitsa; Danielius Kokanauskis; Tomasz Wolski
- Production companies: Atoms & Void (Netherlands); Babi Yar Holocaust Memorial Center (Ukraine)
- Release date: 2021
- Country: Netherlands/Ukraine

Babi Yar. Context (Russian: «Бабий Яр. Контекст»), also known as Babyn Yar. Context (Ukrainian: «Бабин Яр. Контекст»), is a 2021 documentary film by the Ukrainian filmmaker Sergei Loznitsa that explores the prelude and aftermath of the World War II massacre of nearly 34,000 Jews at Babi Yar in Kyiv, Ukraine in September 1941.

The film, which is in Russian and German with English subtitles, features "rare and unseen" archival footage.

== Background ==
In the wake of the German invasion of the Soviet Union in August 1941, Nazi Einsatzgruppen killing squads slaughtered Jews in Ukraine and other areas overrun by their armies in Eastern Europe. On September 29–30, 1941, Nazi forces, with Ukrainian collaborators, killed 33,771 Jews at Babi Yar, a ravine on the outskirts of Kyiv. Other mass shootings of Jews, Roma and Soviet prisoners of war took place at the site until it was liberated by Soviet forces in November 1943. It has been estimated that 100,000 people were killed at the site between 1941 and 1943.

There was no memorial for decades at Babi Yar, and in the 1950s, brick factories filled the ravine with industrial waste. When a monument was finally erected in the 1970s, it did not mention that it was created as a mass execution site of Jews.

As a child, Loznitsa lived in the Nyvki district of Kyiv. Several times a week he used to take a bus to a swimming pool, and on the way back walk past the Babi Yar ravine, and would encounter gravestones written in a "strange language." In a director's statement provided to the European Film Awards, Loznitsa recalled that one day, once he encountered a new stone indicating in Russian that a monument would be built there. Loznitsa asked his parents what happened at the ravine and he "never received a direct answer." The subject was taboo in the 1970s and had been since the 1950s.

== Production ==
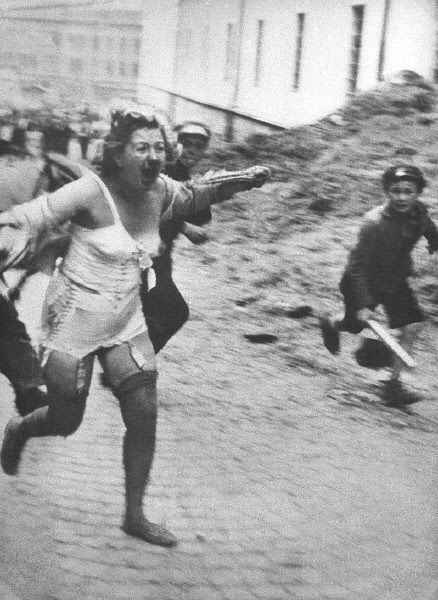
Scenes from the 1941 Lviv pogrom are featured in the documentary (Note: This particular photo doesn't appear in the film)

In creating the film, Loznitsa drew on footage shot by German and Soviet troops during and after the war, as well as testimony from a 1946 Soviet trial of the perpetrators. According to Loznitsa, most of the footage had "languished unseen after the war." The film was obtained from German, Ukrainian, and Russian archival sources. Some of the footage was shot by the German for propaganda purposes, while other footage was from home movies photographed by Germans.

The massacre itself was not photographed, but the film shows earlier persecution of Jews in Lviv, as well as incarceration of Soviet prisoners in open-air stockades. Footage also shows testimony at the trial by a survivor and by Hans Isenmann, one of the SS perpetrators of the massacre, as well as scenes from the Red Army's November 1943 recapture of Kyiv. Also featured is the public hanging of Nazis, including Isenmann, before a large crowd in Kalinin Square, Kyiv, in January 1946, and a public address in Ukraine by Nikita Khrushchev.

The film shows Ukrainians greeting the Nazi invaders, and as well as scenes of joyous Red Army prisoners being released to their families by the Germans in 1941. Throughout, "Loznitsa suggests, in no uncertain terms, that the surviving locals were complicit" in the Babi Yar massacre.

The film's soundtrack consists of ambient noise and music introduced by Loznitsa.

Some of the newly unearthed footage shows buildings in central Kyiv destroyed by the Soviets a few days after the German occupation began. The buildings were mined before the Soviet retreat by the NKVD secret police, and were detonated from afar by remote control.

Babi Yar. Context premiered at the Cannes Film Festival in July 2021. It was screened at the Jerusalem Film Festival in September 2021 and at the BFI London Film Festival. It had its New York premiere at the Museum of the Moving Image on March 20, 2022.

== Reception ==
=== Critical response ===
Babi Yar. Context has an 89% freshness rating at the Rotten Tomatoes review aggregator website, based on 18 reviews, and an average rating of 7.7/10. It also has a score of 83 out of 100 on Metacritic, based on 5 critics, indicating "universal acclaim".

The Forward reviewer PJ Grisar wrote that "Loznitsa’s view of history is clear-eyed, showing where nationalism always leads. His challenge to his country, in throwing light on a dark corner of its past, should be seen for what it is: an act of patriotism." Slant Magazine's review said that the film provides "living documents of a past that, as is all too clear, reverberate into the present with devastating force."

In The New York Times, A.O. Scott wrote that "Loznitsa has assembled a wrenching and revelatory collage."

Simon Abrams of RogerEbert.com gave the film two and a half out of four stars, and said that the "footage is never so meaningful as to overcome the distracting nature of Loznitsa’s obvious streamlining/narrativizing of the past." The director, he says, "encourages viewers to wallow in residual guilt through a vague sort of counter-mythmaking."

Variety reviewer Jay Weissberg said the film "has power but falls short of the director’s greatest works, largely because his span here is considerably longer, and in consequence the focus suffers."

=== Awards and nominations ===
The film won the Golden Eye award at the 2021 Cannes Film Festival.

== See also ==
- Babi Yar Holocaust Memorial Center
- Babi Yar in poetry
- Symphony No. 13 "Babi Yar" by Dmitri Shostakovich
- The Holocaust in the Soviet Union
  - The Holocaust in Ukraine
