= The Event (2015 film) =

- Directed by: Sergei Loznitsa
- Written by: Sergei Loznitsa
- Produced by: Maria Baker-Choustova; Sergei Loznitsa
- Release date: September 2, 2015 (Venice Film Festival)
- Countries: Belgium; Netherlands
- Language: Russian

The Event (Russian: Событие) is a 2015 Russian-language Belgian-Dutch documentary film about the 1991 Soviet coup d'état attempt produced, written and directed by Sergei Loznitsa. It was screened out of competition at the 72nd edition of the Venice Film Festival. It won the prize "Leipziger Ring" at the International Leipzig Festival for Documentary and Animated Film.

Vladimir Putin as aide to St. Petersburg mayor Anatoly Sobchak is shown for a moment.

== Storyline ==
The film tells the story of three days in Leningrad in August 1991, when thousands of people came to Palace Square in support of the democratic forces. On the first day, August 19, there were few people, but the next day there was a huge crowd of about half a million people. The protesters build barricades on the approaches to the Leningrad City Council, leaflets with the logo of the newspaper Chas Pick are distributed, Anatoly Sobchak encourages people on the square from his window, and poets recite revolutionary poems. Sobchak again addresses the people, with his aide Vladimir Putin by his side. On the third day, the State Committee for the State of Emergency is defeated in Moscow, and Anatoly Sobchak in Leningrad declares victory and says that Soviet flags will be replaced by Russian tricolors. At the end of his speech, he said: "Thank you very much for your support, and now go back to your jobs." The young man removes the red flag, while others seal the Smolny Building, where the CPSU was located.
