= Czech Dream =

Coordinates: 50.130°N 014.518°E

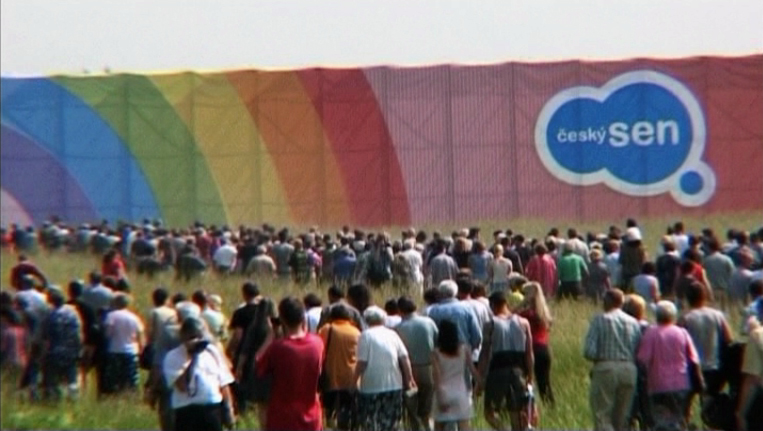
- People moving towards a fake hypermarket
- Directed by: Vít Klusák; Filip Remunda
- Written by: Vít Klusák; Filip Remunda
- Produced by: Czech Television; FAMU; Hypermarket Film; Studio Mirage
- Cinematography: Vít Klusák; Filip Remunda
- Edited by: Zdeněk Marek
- Music by: Varhan Orchestrovič Bauer
- Release date: June 3, 2004
- Running time: 90 minutes
- Country: Czech Republic
- Language: Czech
- Budget: 19 million CZK

Czech Dream (Czech: Český sen) is a 2004 documentary film directed by two Czech film directors, Vít Klusák and Filip Remunda. It recorded a large-scale hoax perpetrated by Klusák and Remunda on the Czech public, culminating in the opening event of a fake hypermarket in the Letňany neighborhood of Prague. The film was their graduation project for film school.

== Concept ==
Remunda and Klusák invented the Český sen ("Czech dream") hypermarket and created a massive advertising campaign around it. Posing as businessmen, the two film students managed to persuade an ad agency and a public relations agency to create a campaign for them. Billboards appeared on Czech highways, and 200,000 pamphlets were distributed in Prague. A jingle was recorded, and there was a series of television commercials. The advertising campaign slogans were "don't come" and "don't spend", etc.

Still, the filmmakers succeeded in attracting more than 3000 shoppers to an empty plain for their "grand opening" on 31 May 2003. What looked like a huge building from a distance was actually only a canvas facade backed by scaffolding.

When the "customers" finally realized that they had been deceived, they reacted in different ways. Some understood the filmmakers' message, some tried to take it optimistically ("At least we had some fresh air"), but most were angry, and many decided to blame the government. Still, there was no violence against the authors.

== Reception ==
On review aggregator website Rotten Tomatoes, the film holds an approval rating of 79% based on 24 reviews, with an average rating of 6.6/10.

== Prizes ==
The film won prizes at festivals in Kraków, Jihlava, Ljubljana, Århus, and Plzeň.

== See also ==
- Entropa: another Czech political, artsy hoax
- Subvertising
