= DAU (project) =

2019 art project by Ilya Khrzhanovsky

DAU is a multidisciplinary project at the intersection of cinema, art, and anthropology, which had its premiere in Paris in early 2019.

== DAU Film ==
DAU was initially conceived as a full length feature film about the life of a genius in troubled times loosely based on the biography of the Soviet physicist and Nobel laureate Lev Landau (nicknamed Dau).

In 2006, the film was co-produced by Philippe Bober and Susanne Marian (Essential Filmproduktion, Germany), Medienboard Berlin-Brandenburg (Germany), WDR/Arte (Germany), Arte France Cinéma (France), Mitteldeutsche Medienförderung (Germany), Eurimages, Swedish Film Institute, Film i Väst (Sweden), Hubert Bals Fund (Netherlands), Ukrainian Ministry of Culture, and X Filme Creative Pool Entertainment GmbH (Germany). The funding provided by the Russian Ministry of Culture was recalled in 2015, and was returned to the Ministry.

After the pre-production in 2006, the filming began in 2007 and took place in Saint Petersburg (Russia) and Kharkiv (Ukraine).

== Institute ==
=== Location and principles of filming ===
After the Saint Petersburg and Kharkiv shooting blocks, the production ceased to function as a conventional film shoot and became a continuous, immersive world in which participants lived their assigned roles full-time, under constant surveillance, rather than acting out scripted scenes.

The project unfolded on the territory of the largest shooting location in Europe spanning 12,000m^{2}, named the Institute, built on the site of the former Dynamo Aquatic Stadium in Kharkiv, Ukraine.

How the location functioned and was used in the filming has suggested parallels between DAU and such projects as Synecdoche, New York and The Truman Show.

The film set was functioning 24/7, regardless if shooting was occurring. The DAU cinematographer Jürgen Jürges designed a special lighting system that allowed shooting at any point without setting up lighting equipment.

The territory of the Institute comprised laboratories, newspaper editorial office, a canteen, residential buildings, the First Department, a hairdresser's, maintenance staff premises; the employees were paid in Soviet rubles. For filming, 40,000 costume elements were produced and purchased. The architecture, costumes, everyday items, food created a phantasmagorical reconstruction of the Soviet era of the 1930s to 1960s, where the characters lived. This format was made possible with the support of Serguei Adoniev, who supported the project in 2007-2019.

In November 2011 the shooting was finished and the location was destroyed, the destruction itself becoming a part of the story The survived items(small and large props, artifacts, costumes) have been preserved and used in other DAU contexts.

=== Characters ===
The auditions for DAU involved 392,000 non-actors. Around 200-300 non-actors lived on-set at any one time and around 400 were filmed including scientists, musicians, artists, composers, religious leaders and philosophers, as well as waitresses, cleaners, secret police officers, cooks and hairdressers.

The unscripted process was filmed intermittently from October 2009 to November 2011 during which no modern clothes including underwear, no modern sanitary products or any other modern objects or vocabulary were allowed on the set and period costume, make-up and hairstyles were required from everyone including the crew, regardless if shooting was occurring.

With no script or takes, the characters acted and reacted in the meticulously designed circumstances, sometimes staying on set for months.

'Placed in a real replica of a Soviet institute, with its authentic smells, clothes and interiors, social behavior and social dispositions, the hero feels placed in a semi-real space-time. And it's the actor who becomes the first spectator of "DAU", finding themselves between the immanence of their own presence in the present and the absurdity of someone else's, but reconstructed time and space'.

Everyone, with the exception of Dau (conductor Teodor Currentzis), his wife (actress Radmila Schegoleva), their son (as young adult - musician Nikolai Voronov), and Krupitsa, director of the institute from 1938 to 1953 (theater director Anatoly Vasiliev), lived in the Institute under their own names. Their real biographies were adapted to Soviet realities.

There were two scientific departments at the Institute. In the theoretical department contemporary theoretical physicists, neuroscientists and biologists were carrying out their research, including Profs. Nobel laureate David Gross, Fields Medal winner Shing-Tung Yau, Nikita Nekrasov, Dmitry Kaledin, Andrey Losev, Samson Shatashvili, Carlo Rovelli, Eric Verlinde, James H. Fallon, and others. Some of its results were published in academic journals. In the experimental department, headed by Alexei Blinov, media and performance contemporary artists were conducting their experiments. Among the employees and the guests of the Institute there were Marina Abramović, Carsten Höller, Boris Mikhailov, Peter Sellars, Romeo Castellucci, Rav Steinsaltz, Peruvian shaman Guillermo Arévalo and others.

The Institute hosted conferences and seminars on quantum physics, string theory and loop quantum gravity, neuroscience, as well as experiments in areas beyond traditional scientific knowledge, such as orgone energy, teleportation and human superpowers.

== The genre of the project. Film material and products ==
The duration of the Institute material is 700 hours of 35mm-film.

The original idea of Ilya Khrzhanovsky to create a film about Lev Landau transformed, along the line, into a large-scale study of human nature, that continues to this day. In addition to the mentioned participants, the project involved, at various stages: artist Philippe Parreno, designer Rei Kawakubo, musicians Robert Del Naja (Massive Attack), Brian Eno, Vladimir Martynov, Tatiana Grindenko, Arca, Leonid Fedorov, Vladimir Volkov and many more.

There are disputes regarding the genre of the project: “Is it possible to create a work in the genre of an entire culture? Culture incorporates music, cinema, literature, painting, science, office work, all ways of social behavior and interpersonal communication. Khrzhanovsky created a work in the genre of culture of the 1930s–60s.”; “the DAU project, therefore, is not a Gesamtkunstwerk, but a work in the Gesamtkunstwerk genre, i.e. a kind of anti-Gesamtkunstwerk”; “perhaps it is more correct to call it the most ambitious experiment in the field of the theater”; “the sprawling immersive-theater/film/installation project”; “a striking combination of documentary and feature films, artistic fiction and the truth of life, the imaginary and the real, the past and the present”; “somewhere between a behavioral experiment, a cinematic cycle and an art installation”; “a total artwork”; “this phenomenon can be called the territory of memory - individual, collective, historical and artistic”.

All of that said, a range of cinematic products have been created out of the DAU film material by various directors. The project has also taken other forms.

=== Movies, series, video performances ===
13 films of various genres were presented at the premiere of the project in Paris in 2019. The movies were voiced by Gérard Depardieu, Willem Dafoe, Isabelle Adjani, Fanny Ardant, Isabelle Huppert, Charlotte Rampling, Iris Berben, Hanna Schygulla, Barbara Sukowa, Katharina Thalbach, Veronica Ferres, Heike Makatsch, Toni Garrn, Lilith Stangenberg, Kathrin Angerer, Palina Rojinski, Vicky Krieps, Jella Haase, Lars Eidinger, Martin Wuttke, Blixa Bargeld, Bela B, Bill Kaulitz, Tom Schilling, Marc Hosemann, Frederick Lau, Franz Rogowski, Louis Hofmann, Sven Marquardt, Tahar Rahim, Denis Lavant, Lou de Laâge, Eric Cantona, Pascal Greggory, and Amira Casar.

A number of other products are in the process of post-production.

=== Dau. Digital ===
Khrzhanovsky claims that the movies are just trailers, of what he calls the main product - Dau.Digital, an interactive online platform presenting all 700 hours of rushes where a user is navigated by the tags and can structure their own narrative. This product was also presented to the visitors of the Paris premiere.

Dau. Digital was made public in 2019.

=== Books ===
==== Dialogues of characters ====
Transcribed conversations of characters recorded during the shooting as well as off shooting were available at the Paris premiere.

==== DAU Document ====
Thames & Hudson prepared the publication of DAU Document, collecting stills from all footage, on-set photographs shot with Soviet-era Leica cameras (selected from 1.5 million images) and results of the scientific experiments carried out in the film. Essays exploring themes such as the nature of community, power, love, altered states of consciousness and violence intersperse the visual chronological account. The final section catalogues the 80,000 items of period clothing and props as well as the characters who populate the project, where frames from all the footage are presented in chronological order.

==== Comme des Garçons × DAU Institute 1938-1952 ====
In 2018 Comme des Garçons collaborated with DAU project to release an album of photographs as part of their annual initiative of publishing the work of artists and photographers.

==== Les Salons DAU ====
In 2018 The DAU Rooms at Le Châtelet special edition was released as ‘a gift to the city of Paris’ containing the works of Bakst, Larionov and Natalia Goncharova next to the fragments of DAU installations with forewords by the Mayor of Paris Anne Hidalgo, Artistic Director of the Châtelet Theater Ruth Mackenzie and others.

=== Complex Installations ===
Complex installations have been an integral part of the project since the Institute functioned during the shooting, creating immersive experiences for visitors and residents.

==== Berlin. Preparation of the release and its cancellation ====
For the film screening in Berlin, it was planned to create a replica of the Berlin Wall; the event was supposed to be the first in a series Dau. Freedom (Berlin) - Dau. Equality (Paris) - Dau. Fraternity (London), and was planned with the support and participation of directors Tom Tykwer and Romeo Castellucci, artists Marina Abramović, Carsten Höller and Ai Weiwei, musicians Teodor Currentzis, Brian Eno, Robert Del Naja and Massive Attack, politicians Michael Müller, the Governing Mayor of Berlin, and Monika Grütters, the Federal Government Commissioner for Culture and the Media. The concept was to rebuild a part of the Berlin wall to create ‘a closed-off mini-state, complete with visa checks for visitors’. Upon entering the venue, visitors were to undergo a body search procedure by the security composed of the Israeli military men; on this closed territory visitors were to immerse into performances and concerts of artists including Romeo Castellucci, Carsten Höller, Massive Attack and in particular a performance of Marina Abramović and Teodor Currentzis, whose participants were to go through the washing procedure (a reference to the gas chambers under the guise of a shower in concentration camps). The event was supposed to end with a ritual destruction of The Wall with each participant to be offered to carry a piece of the wall with them.

In September 2018 the city authorities cancelled the event, referring to safety and technical issues. The cancellation was followed by a discussion: Fanny Ardant, Isabelle Adjani, Robert del Naja, Willem Dafoe, Gérard Depardieu, Brian Eno, Ruth Mackenzie, Kristin Scott Thomas, Hanna Schygulla, Sasha Waltz, Tom Tykwer and other artists, directors, curators, politicians, producers spoke publicly in support of the project and against the opinion that it was not acceptable as Berliners ‘had had this Wall for enough time’.

==== Release in Paris ====
Films created from the material filmed in the Institute were released for the first time in Paris between January 25 and February 17, 2019, with the support of the City Hall of Paris and executive producer Martine d'Anglejan-Chatillon. Visitors of the Paris event also had the opportunity to watch actual rushes, exploring Dau.Digital.

The release was hosted by Châtelet Theater and Théâtre de la Ville that both became venues for Serguey Diaghilev's Russian Seasons a century earlier, as well as by Centre Pompidou that housed an installation reconstructing an apartment at the Institute and inhabited by the characters of the project. The museum also provided contemporary art works by Soviet and Russian artists of 1950s-2000s from its collection “Kollektsia!" (2016) to be used as a part of an installation in the theatres. Among the exhibited works there were those by Oscar Rabin, Grisha Bruskin, Sergey Bugaev "Afrika", Erik Bulatov and others.

The initial plan to connect the two theaters with a bridge did not come true, and the theatre buildings and the Pompidou Museum building were connected by a projection of red light lines forming a triangle instead - an installation was inspired by the Russian avant-garde of the 1920s. The connection between the project, the Paris premiere in particular, and the art of avant-garde was also created by the design of the space in the Châtelet Theater by the artists Olga Gurevich, Alexandra Smolina, Boris Shapovalov.

To access the event visitors had to obtain a DAU visa - 6 hours, 24 hours or an unlimited one, When “applying” for a visa, the visitor was asked to answer personal questions (“Have you felt used in your relationships”?).

The space of the theaters was divided into zones (“Motherhood”, “Communism”, “Revolution”, etc.).

Screenings of the films (without titles, but numbered), conferences, performances, concerts, shamanic rituals were simultaneously held at the venues; it was not possible to learn about the schedule in advance - the principle of uncertainty and constant metamorphosis, offering the visitor an unexpected encounter rather than regular format and experience, became part of the concept of the project.

In accordance with this concept and as part of the project, performances by renowned artists were held incognito, without posters or ads. During Paris events, Théâtre du Châtelet and Théâtre de la Ville hosted Teodor Currentzis and MusicAeterna, Jazz Aeterna, and TrigolOS, musicians Mikhail Rudy, Tatiana Grindenko, Vladimir Martynov, Vladimir Tarasov, Mikhail Mordvinov, Dmitry Uvarov, Vangelino Currentzis, Marko Nikodievich, Leonid Fedorov, Vladimir Volkov, singer Sergey Starostin, opera singer Ekaterina Shcherbachenko, singer and performer Arca, Robert Del Naja (Massive Attack), and Brian Eno, who developed a bespoke acoustic architecture for DAU. Also, performances of Sasha Waltz and her dance troupe, as well as installations of Romeo Castellucci and Philippe Parreno, took place in different DAU spaces. Writer Jonathan Littell, futurologist Real Miller, professor of physics and string theorist Nikita Nekrasov, writer and social critic Evgeny Morozov, photographer Reza Deghati, biophysicist prof. Sonia Contera, writer Alexander Etkind, and others took part in the DAU conferences in Paris.

The musical installations shaping the event's soundscape, produced by Vangelino Kurenzis and Damien Quintard, included works by Brian Eno and Robert del Naja.

An important part of the visitors' experience was also The Shitty Hole bar, buffets (in particular the "porn buffet") and a canteen with a Soviet menu where prices changed randomly throughout the day.

Another element of the installation was a souvenir shop, referring to Soviet village shops (cans, cigarettes, sink plungers, petroleum lamps, condoms, rolling pins, etc.), also selling the printed products of the project — photographs, books-transcriptions of the characters’ conversations.

At the Théâtre de la Ville one could visit a reconstructed Soviet communal apartment, with performers-residents living there around the clock, and Altai shamans performing rituals; works from the Centre Pompidou were also exhibited in this space, in particular Sergey Bugaev "Afrika"'s “John Cage hands over the banner of socialist competition to Kuryokhin”.

The venue was also dotted by waxwork figures of DAU characters.

Round-the-clock public screenings of the films were accompanied by the sessions of ‘active listening’ for visitors with priests, pastors, rabbis, social workers and doctors as a counterpart With visitors’ permission, conversations were recorded.

According to media reports, from January 25 to February 17, 2019, about 40 thousand people visited the DAU project in Paris.

=== Conferences ===
The conferences at Paris premiere continued a series of conferences started in London in 2017 to explore the wide range of cultural, social, and political issues raised in DAU. The DAU conferences to the date are as follows:

- "Import and export of the Russian revolution: ideological, political and communal exchange." (25–25 February 2017, London School of Economics and Political Science). Some of those who took part in the conference were professors Teodor Shanin, Alexander Etkind, Mark Steinberg, Simon Dixon, John Butler, Erik van Raaij, Viktoria Zhuravleva, and David Wolf.
- "The protagonists of political mythology: how do individuals and collectives enter into history?" (25–26 March 2017, House of Commons, Parliament of the United Kingdom, University of Westminster), with the participation of the first president of Ukraine Leonid Kravchuk, the first state secretary of Russia Gennady Burbulis, Chairman of the Supreme Soviet of the Republic of Belarus Stanislav Shushkevich, UK Ambassador to USSR Sir Roderick Braithwaite, West German Ambassador to USSR Andreas Mayer Landrut, professors Robert Service, Linda Cook, Mark Fenster, Judith Pallot, and others.
- "The experience of extremism: faith, violence and liberation movements." (24–26 May 2017, House of Lords, Parliament of the United Kingdom, London Royal Society), with the participation of the former Chief of Staff of the Armed Forces of the United Kingdom, Sir Michael David Jackson, Representative of the Government of Autonomous Kurdistan His Excellency Karvan Jamal Tahir, Colonel Vladimir Azhippo, Professor James Fallon, members of the international tribunal from the former Yugoslavia Marko Sladojević (Serbia), Amir Cengic (Bosnia), and Davor Laznic (Croatia), former publicity director at Sinn Féin Danny Morrison (Northern Ireland).

== List of films and series ==
The character of Lev Landau as played by Teodor Currentzis appears only in the films DAU. Nora Mother, DAU. Katya Tanya, DAU. The Empire and DAU. Three Days.

=== Films ===
- DAU. Dau (dir. Ilya Khrzhanovskiy)
- DAU. Brave people (dir. Ilya Khrzhanovskiy, Aleksei Sliusarchuk)
- DAU. Nora Mother (dir. Ilya Khrzhanovskiy, Jekaterina Oertel)
- DAU. Empire (dir. Ilya Khrzhanovskiy, Anatoliy Vasiliev)
- DAU. Katya Tanya (dir. Ilya Khrzhanovskiy, Jekaterina Oertel)
- DAU. Conformists (dir. Ilya Khrzhanovskiy, Aleksei Sliusarchuk)
- DAU. Three days (dir. Ilya Khrzhanovskiy, Jekaterina Oertel)
- DAU. Sasha Valera (dir. Ilya Khrzhanovskiy, Jekaterina Oertel)
- DAU. Nikita Tanya (dir. Ilya Khrzhanovskiy, Jekaterina Oertel)
- DAU. String theory (dir. Ilya Khrzhanovskiy, Aleksei Sliusarchuk)
- DAU. New man (dir. Ilya Khrzhanovskiy, Ilya Permyakov)
- DAU. Nora Son (dir. Ilya Khrzhanovskiy, Jekaterina Oertel)
- DAU. Natasha (dir. Ilya Khrzhanovskiy, Jekaterina Oertel)
- DAU. Degeneration (dir. Ilya Khrzhanovskiy, Ilya Permyakov)
- DAU. Regeneration (dir. Ilya Khrzhanovskiy, Ilya Permyakov)

=== Series ===
- DAU. Nora (dir. Ilya Khrzhanovskiy, Jekaterina Oertel)
- DAU. Menu (dir. Ilya Khrzhanovskiy, Jekaterina Oertel)
- DAU. Degeneration (dir. Ilya Khrzhanovskiy, Ilya Permyakov)
- DAU. Science (dir. Ilya Khrzhanovskiy, Dmitry Kaledin)
- DAU. Concerts
- DAU. Experiments

== Criticism of the project ==
=== Allegations of breach of professional ethics and unfeigned violence, and denials ===
Criticism of the project predominantly focused on questions of transparency, work ethics, and respect for the rights of DAU participants. Critical accounts mostly contain references to the anonymous testimonies of participants involved for only a short time. Neither participants nor creators of the DAU material shown at the Paris premiere criticized the project. The project also spawned discussions about the limits of what is permissible in cinema.

At the premiere of the film Dau. Natasha at the 70th Berlin International Film Festival in February 2020, five Russian journalists addressed the artistic director of the festival Carlo Chatrian and the CEO Mariette Rissenbeek with an open letter expressing concern about the use of "real psychological and physical violence", in particular towards a non-professional actress Natalia Berezhnaya, and questioning the ethics of including the film in the competition. Chatrian responded that the questions were re-addressed to the production company and to the actresses, who denied the allegations; detailed responses from Khrzhanovsky, the film crew and actresses were also received at the press conference. Later, the accusations of the authors of the open letter were also refuted by the actress Natalia Berezhnaya in an interview to a major Iskusstvo Kino ('Film Art') magazine.

=== Allegations of overspending and poor organization of events ===
Criticism of the project also concerns unreasonable amount of resources spent to achieve artistic results that have already been achieved, such as blurring the boundaries between real and fictional, performer and character, deconstructing history and immersing in it. Criticism of the Paris premiere also included reviews of poor organization and bad navigation. The creators and some critics claim that the principle of uncertainty as an artistic element of the project and a way of interacting with the audience.

== Distribution in Russia ==
In Russia four DAU movies (Dau.Natasha, Dau. Nora Son, Dau. Sasha Valera, and Dau. New Man) were denied a cinema distribution licence by the Russian Ministry of Culture on the grounds of promoting pornography. In 2020, the film company Phenomenon Films took the decision to court, demanding the films be granted a distribution license, but the demands were rejected.

== Honors ==
- Selected for European Film Market, Sofia, Bulgaria (2005)
- Selected as one of the 18 best world projects at the Atelier of the Cannes Film Festival (2006)
- Included in the best 10 projects at International Film Festival CineMart (2006, Rotterdam, Netherlands)
- 4th out of 10 best movies of 2019 selected by Film Art magazine
- «Silver Bear» for Outstanding Artistic Contribution at the 70th Berlin International Film Festival to cinematographer Jürgen Jürges(2020).
- Dau. Degeneration - rated 2 in Berlinale critics ratings (2020).
- Dau. Degeneration - rated 1 in the list of the best movies of the first half of 2020 by independent online magazine for film, cinema&TV Film plus Kritik
- DAU. Natasha - Feature Film Selection 2020 by European Film Academy(2020).
- DAU. Natasha. European Film Academy: Natalia Berezhnaya nominated European Actress 2020, (2020).
- Dau. Degeneration: Grand Prix at The Festival of Auteur Cinema in Belgrade (2020).
- DAU. Natasha - Official Selection at The Seville European Film Festival (2020).
- DAU. Natasha - Official Selection at Palić European Film Festival(2020).
- DAU. Natasha - Official Selection at Riga International Film Festival (2020).
- Dau. Degeneration - Official Selection at Ostrava Film Festival (2020).
- Dau. Degeneration - The Third International Film Award "East – West. The Golden Arch": Best Cinematography, Jürgen Jürges (2021).

== Production team ==
- Jürgen Jürges – Director of Photography, Lighting Designer
- Manuel Alberto Claro – Saint Petersburg Unit Operator
- Denis Shibanov – Project Art Director
- Jekaterina Oertel, Ilya Permyakov, Alexey Slyusarchuk - Editing Directors
- Boris Shapovalov – Art Director of the Saint Petersburg Unit
- Olga Gurevich – Art Director of the Kharkiv Unit
- Jekaterina Oertel – Make-up Artist
- Maksym Demydenko – Post-Production Executive Producer and Sound Director
- Anastasia Smekalova – Casting Director
- Alexey Slyusarchuk, Vera Levchenko, Inna Shorr, Dmitry Mogilenets – Second Directors at the Site
- Anton Stoudennikov - First Assistant Director
- Zoya Popova - First Assistant Director Special Projects
- Volker Gläser – The Second Camera
- Jörg Gruber – First Assistant Operator, Third Camera
- Michael Siebert – Focus-Puller, First Assistant Operator
- Yevgeny Kravchynia – Art Assistant
- Arina Galantseva – Art Assistant
- Alexander Mordovin – Art Assistant
- Elena Shmakova – Assistant Art Director for Props
- Julia Zelenaya – Assistant Sound Engineer
- Alexandra Timofeeva – Head of the Costume Department, Executive Producer
- Irina Tsvetkova, Elena and Olga Bekritskie, Lyubov Mingazitdinova, Alexandra Smolina - Costume Designers
- Susanne Marian – Producer
- Philippe Bober – Film Producer
- Svetlana Dragayeva – Executive Producer
- Artem Vasiliev – Producer of the Preparation and Filming of the Saint Petersburg and Kharkiv Units
- Daria Sherman – Post-Production Line Producer
- Menelaos Pampoukidis – Visual Effects Supervisor
- Stefan Smith - Sound Designer

== DAU Participants ==
- Teodor Currentzis — Dau
- Radmila Schegoleva — Nora
- Anatoly Vasiliev — Krupitsa
- Aleksei Trifonov
- Alexei Blinov
- Dmitry Kaledin
- Olga Shkabarnya
- Nikita Nekrasov
- Vladimir Azhippo
- Fyodor Safronov
- Andrey Losev
- Daria Berzhitskaya
- Natalia Berezhnaya
- Ekaterina Yuspina
- Tatyana Polozhiy
- Valeriy Andreev
- Alexander Bozhik
- Tatiana Pyatina
- Zoya Popova
- Nikolay Voronov — Denis
- Anna Volkova
- Viktoria Skitskaya
- Samson Shatashvili
- Maria Shtilmark
- Maria Nafpliotou
- Alina Alekseeva
- Konstanton Leshan
- Anatoliy Sidko
- Maxim Martsinkevich
- Kristina Babich
- Vladimir Yermolenko
- Pavel Gordiyenko
- Alexander Serdyuk
- Lidiya Schegoleva
- James H. Fallon
- Luc Bigé
- Marina Abramović
- Romeo Castellucci
- Boris Mikhailov
- David Gross
- Shing-Tung Yau
- Гильермо Аревало
- RavSteinsaltz
- Carsten Höller
- Peter Sellars
- Tatiana Grindenko
- Vladimir Martynov
- Leonid Fedorov
- Vladimir Volkov
- Guillermo Arévalo
- Guerman Karelsky
- Vyacheslav Tcheltuev

== Editing Directors of DAU film products ==
- Jekaterina Oertel
  - DAU-3 / DAU. Nora Mother
  - DAU-5 / DAU. Katya Tanya
  - DAU-7 / DAU. Three days
  - DAU-8/ DAU. Sasha Valera
  - DAU-9.1 / DAU. Nikita Tanya
  - DAU-12 / DAU. Natasha
  - DAU-11 / DAU. Nora Son
  - DAU-S1 / DAU. Nora (series)
  - DAU-S2 / DAU. Menu (series)
- Ilya Permyakov
  - DAU-10 / DAU. New Man
  - DAU-13 / DAU.Degeneration
  - DAU-14 / DAU. Regeneration
- Anatoly Vasiliev
  - DAU-4 / DAU. Empire
- Aleksei Sliusarchuk
  - DAU-2 / DAU. Brave people
  - DAU-6 / DAU. Conformists
  - DAU-9.2 / DAU. String theory
- Dmitry Kaledin
  - DAU. Science (series)

== See also ==
- Dau (film)
- DAU. Natasha
