= Ilya Khrzhanovsky =

Russian film director (born 1975)

- Илья Хржановский
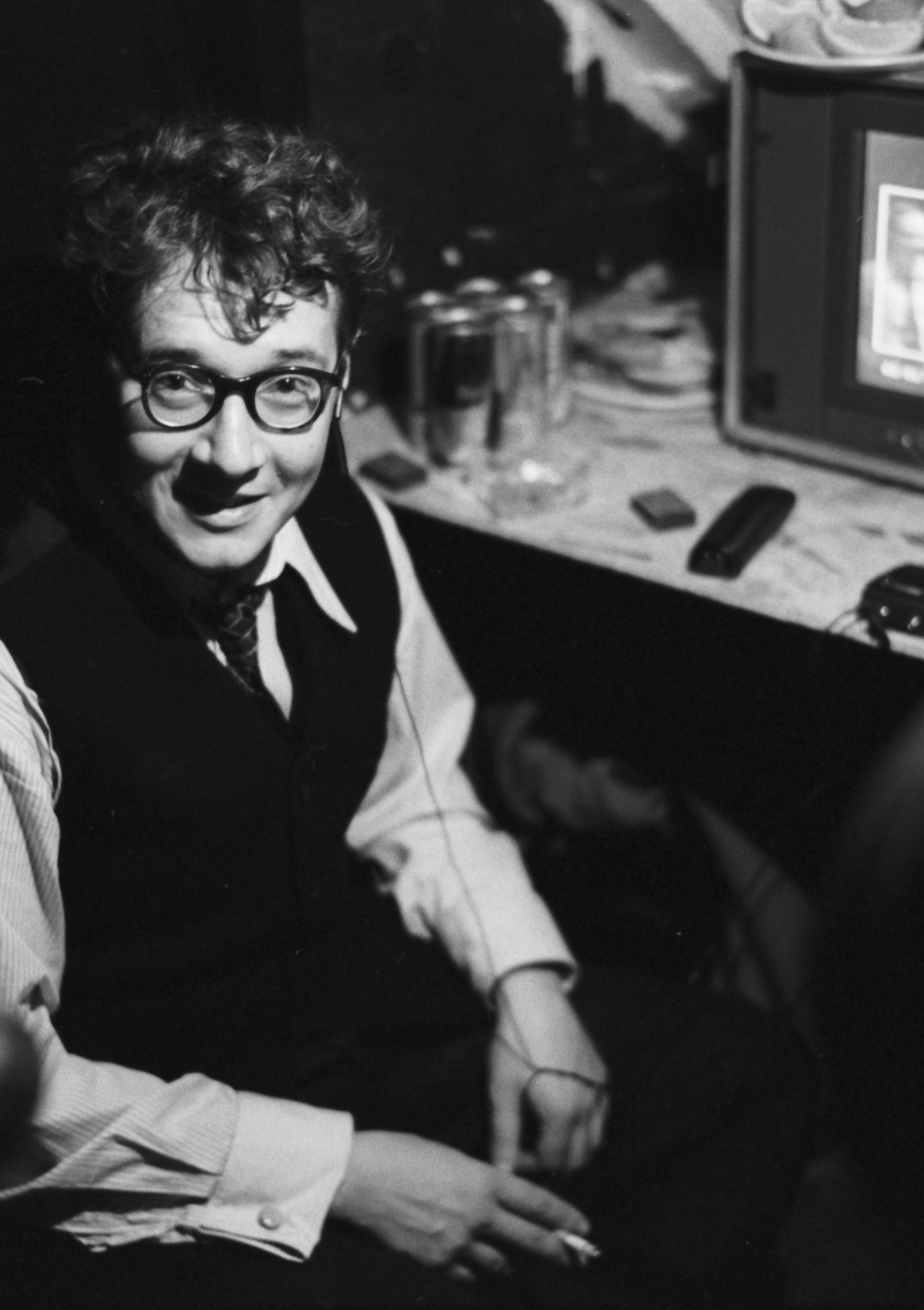
- Ilya Khrzhanovsky
- Born: Ilya Andreyevich Khrzhanovsky; 11 August 1975 (age 51); Moscow, Russian SFSR, Soviet Union
- Citizenship: British, German, Israeli
- Occupation: Filmmaker
- Children: Andrey
- Father: Andrei Khrzhanovsky
- Website: www.ilya-khrzhanovskiy.com

Ilya Andreyevich Khrzhanovsky (Russian: Илья́ Андре́евич Хржано́вский; born 11 August 1975) is a Russian-born filmmaker, producer and art director. His debut feature 4 (2004) won the Tiger Award at the International Film Festival Rotterdam.

He is best known for the DAU project, a multidisciplinary undertaking at the intersection of cinema, art and anthropology that has yielded 14 feature films, three TV series and large-scale immersive installations; DAU premiered in 2019 in Paris at the Théâtre du Châtelet, Théâtre de la Ville and Centre Pompidou. In 2020, DAU. Natasha and DAU. Degeneration were screened at the 70th Berlinale with DAU. Natasha receiving the Silver Bear for сinematographer Jürgen Jürges' work, alongside nominations for the European Film Awards.

From 2020 to 2023 he served as Artistic Director of the Babyn Yar Holocaust Memorial Center in Kyiv.

In 2026, his film DAU premiered in competition at the 83rd Venice International Film Festival, where Khrzhanovsky was awarded the Silver Lion for Best Director.

== Early career ==
Khrzhanovsky attended the Bonn Academy of Fine Arts (1992–1993) and the All-Russian State Institute of Cinematography (1998) (VGIK). His directorial debut was the stage production of What I Feel (Russian: «То, что чувствую») at the Kukart Festival at Peterhof in 1997.

== Career ==
In 1998 he co-directed together with Artyom Mikhalkov the short movie Stop (Russian: «Остановка»).

Between 1998 and 2002, Khrzhanovsky worked as a director and producer in commercial advertising and created The List of Lovers of the RF for the Russian TNT Channel, a series directed by leading Russian movie directors. In 2003, the project was included in the Berlin International Film Festival programme, as well as other notable Russian and international film festivals.

Khrzhanovsky directed the film 4 (2004) earning him several awards including a Golden Cactus and Tiger Award at the Rotterdam International Film Festival in the Netherlands, Best Director Prize at the Buenos Aires International Festival of Independent Cinema, Grand Jury Prize as Best New Director at the Seattle International Film Festival, Best Film and Best Camera Prize at the Transylvania International Film Festival, Best Director Prize at the Athens International Film Festival and a nomination for the Fassbinder Award. It was included in official programs of more than 50 international film festivals including Venice Film Festival, International Film Festival Rotterdam, Los Angeles Film Festival, Seattle International Film Festival and Tribeca Film Festival. 4 was distributed in the United Kingdom, France, Italy, Netherlands, Belgium, the United States, and also Scandinavian and South Asian countries.

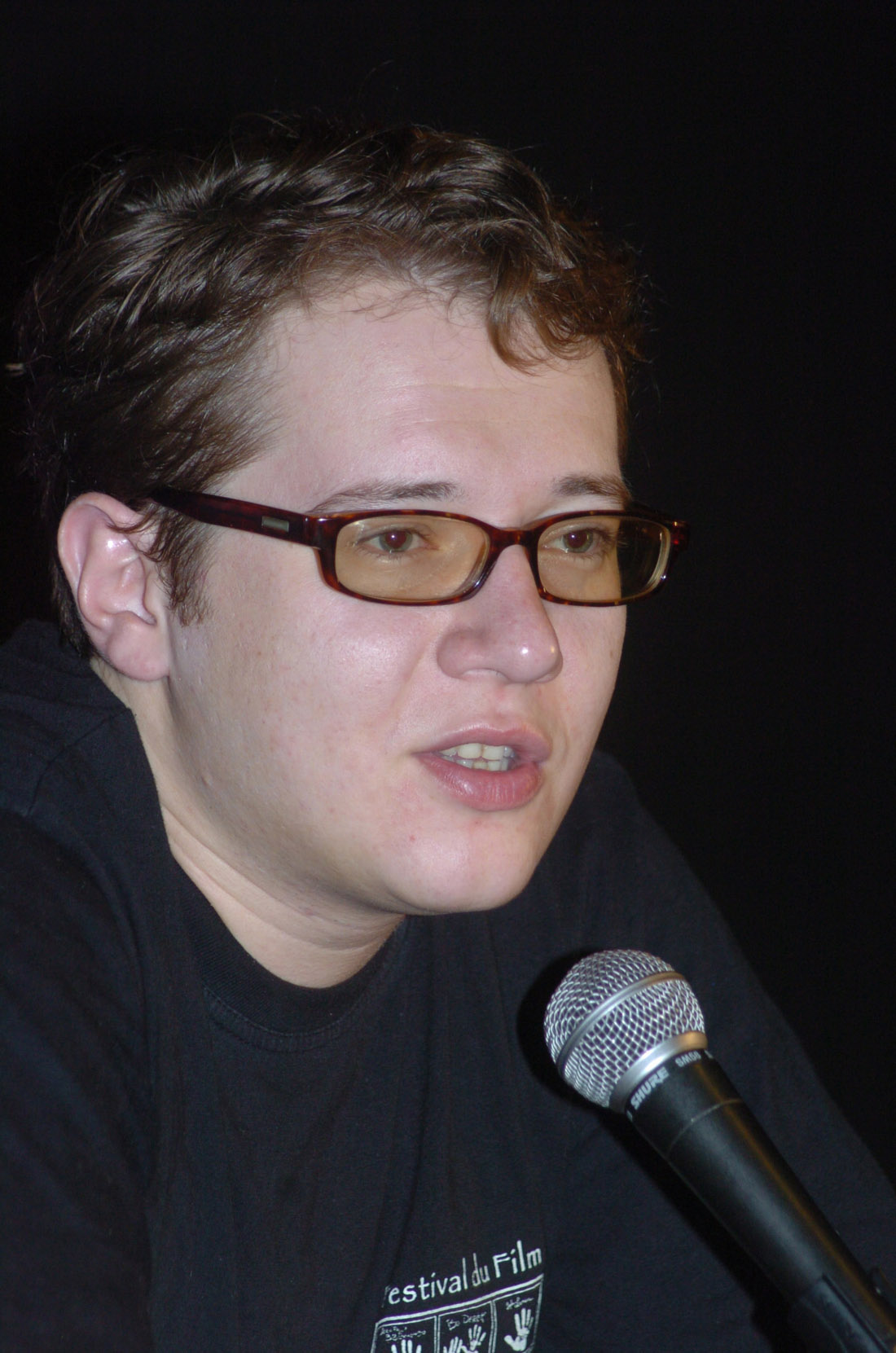
Khrzhanovsky in 2005

In 2005 Khrzhanovsky co-founded Phenomen Films production company. Phenomen Films developed and produced the critically acclaimed film Paper Soldier (2008) by Aleksei German Jr, that won among others the Silver Lion for Best Direction and Golden Osella for Best Cinematography, at the 65th Venice Film Festival. It was also nominated for European Cinematographer at the European Film Awards.

In 2009 Khrzhanovsky co-founded Phenomen-Ukraine and in 2010 co-founded Phenomen Berlin Filmproduktions GmbH (Germany).

In 2025, Khrzhanovsky co-founded IP Filmworks with producer Philippe Bober in France.

In 2026, DAU premiered in competition at the 83rd Venice International Film Festival, where Khrzhanovsky was awarded the Silver Lion for Best Director. The film also received the Premio Bisato D'Oro for Best Film from an independent film critics' jury.

=== DAU project ===
DAU is a multidisciplinary project at the intersection of cinema, art and anthropology that premiered in Paris in 2019. DAU was initially conceived as a full-length feature film about the life of a genius in troubled times loosely based on the biography of the Soviet physicist and Nobel laureate Lev Landau (nicknamed Dau).

However the filming process transformed into a 'total performance' and 'total installation' rather than a conventional film shoot.

In 2008 in Kharkiv, Ukraine, the largest shooting location in Europe spanning 12,000m^{2}, named the institute, was constructed as part of the project. How the location functioned and was used in the filming has suggested parallels between DAU and such projects as Synecdoche, New York and The Truman Show.

The auditions for DAU involved 392,000 non-actors. Around 200-300 non-actors lived on-set at any one time and around 400 were filmed including scientists, musicians, artists, composers, religious leaders and philosophers, as well as waitresses, cleaners, secret police officers, cooks and hairdressers. 40,000 costume units were produced and purchased during shooting.

The architecture, costumes, objects and food created a phantasmagorical reconstruction of the Soviet era of the 1930s to 1960s. The unscripted process was filmed intermittently from October 2009 to November 2011 during which no modern clothes including underwear, no modern sanitary products or any other modern objects or vocabulary were allowed on the set and period costume, make-up and hairstyles were required from everyone including the crew, regardless if shooting was occurring. With no script or takes, the characters acted and reacted in the meticulously designed circumstances, sometimes staying on set for months. Everyone, with the exception of Dau (conductor Teodor Currentzis), his wife (actress Radmila Schegoleva), their son (as young adult - musician Nikolai Voronov), and Krupitsa, director of the institute from 1938 to 1953 (theater director Anatoly Vasiliev), lived in the Institute under their own names. Their real biographies were adapted to Soviet realities. Among the employees and the guests of the Institute there were theoretical physicists, neuroscientists and biologists, including Profs. Nobel laureate David Gross, Fields Medal winner Shing-Tung Yau, Nikita Nekrasov, Dmitry Kaledin, Andrey Losev, Samson Shatashvili, Carlo Rovelli, Eric Verlinde, James H. Fallon, and media and performance contemporary artists including Marina Abramović, Carsten Höller, Boris Mikhailov, Peter Sellars, Romeo Castellucci, Alexei Blinov, Rav Steinsaltz, Peruvian shaman Guillermo Arévalo and others.

The process resulted in 700 hours of 35mm film. The final shoot cost more than €20 million. The project was financed by private investors; as of 2025, post-production was financed by Philippe Bober's Coproduction Office, other private investors and Khrzhanovsky's own money.

13 films of various genres edited from this material were part of the premiere in Paris in 2019. The movies were voiced by Gérard Depardieu, Willem Dafoe, Isabelle Adjani, Fanny Ardant, Isabelle Huppert, Charlotte Rampling, Hanna Schygulla, Vicky Krieps, Jella Haase, Lars Eidinger, Blixa Bargeld, Denis Lavant, and others. The 'mother film' that focused on Dau's life story with the Institute being just one of the storylines yet to be released.

In August 2025, Khrzhanovsky announced that the main film, DAU, had been in post-production for two and a half years and was expected to be released in 2026, alongside two other features. He also confirmed that two TV series were being edited from the footage.

On 23 July 2026, DAU was announced as part of the competition line-up of the 83rd Venice International Film Festival (2–12 September 2026), selected by artistic director Alberto Barbera. Covering the four decades from 1928 to 1968, the film combines material shot between 2008 and 2011 with scenes filmed in 2024, and marks the first release of the project's long-announced 'main film', in which the Institute forms one storyline among several. It screens as a world premiere and competes for the Golden Lion before a jury chaired by Maggie Gyllenhaal.

In total, the material yielded 14 feature films, three TV series, video performances and scientific films.

The genre of the project is defined by critics as 'sprawling immersive-theater/film/installation', 'totalitarian reality show', 'not just film or theatre but also of site-specific improvisational performances' and also as 'the entire culture of the 1930s-1960s'.

Apart from movie products, the project has additionally manifested in other formats such as books, conferences and complex installations.

=== DAU (film 2026) ===
On 9 September 2026, the long-announced "mother film" of the DAU project, DAU, premiered in competition at the 83rd Venice International Film Festival. On 12 September Khrzhanovsky was awarded the Silver Lion for Best Director for the film.

The German-French-Swedish co-production combines footage shot between 2008 and 2011 with additional cinematography undertaken in later years. Inspired by the lives of Soviet physicists who developed the atomic bomb, DAU follows a brilliant Greek-born physicist from 1928 through the decades in the Soviet Union. Driven to uncover the laws of the universe, Dau is drawn into state service to help develop nuclear weapons. Inside a secret research institute, life is governed by scientific ambition, power, surveillance and privilege. As his autonomy erodes, he seeks freedom beyond his marriage through a series of affairs, gradually losing both himself and his capacity to love. The film combines an intimate portrait of a man seeking happiness and freedom with a broader depiction of a society shaped by violence and ideology.

Critical responses to DAU highlighted its scale, visual style and ambitious approach to historical material. The Financial Times, The Guardian and Time Out all awarded the film five-star reviews, while other publications emphasized its psychological and visceral intensity. The International Cinephile Society called it "transfixing, mesmerizing, infuriating, and frightening all at the same time", while Der Freitag commented that the film "gets under your skin in an almost uncomfortable way". Luis Martinez writes for El Mundo:

DAU moves forward, especially in its first half, with a dazzling capacity for visual gigantism... It is a spectacular cinema that strips bare, down to the bone, the pretense of any attempt at spectacle.

=== Books ===
Transcribed conversations of characters recorded during the shooting as well as off shooting were available at the Paris premiere.

Thames & Hudson prepared the publication of DAU Document, collecting stills from all footage, on-set photographs shot with Soviet-era Leica cameras (selected from 1.5 million images) and results of the scientific experiments carried out in the film. Essays exploring themes such as the nature of community, power, love, altered states of consciousness and violence intersperse the visual chronological account. The final section catalogues the 80,000 items of period clothing and props as well as the characters who populate the project, where frames from all the footage are presented in chronological order.

In 2018 Comme des Garçons collaborated with DAU project to release an album of photographs as part of their annual initiative of publishing the work of artists and photographers.

In 2018 The DAU Rooms at Le Châtelet special edition was released as 'a gift to the city of Paris' containing the works of Bakst, Larionov and Natalia Goncharova next to the fragments of DAU installations with forewords by the Mayor of Paris Anne Hidalgo, artistic director of the Châtelet Theater Ruth Mackenzie and others.

=== Conferences ===
In 2017 a series of conferences started in London to explore the wide range of cultural, social, and political issues raised in DAU. The participants included historians, scientists, political figures, diplomats, such as professors Teodor Shanin, Alexander Etkind, Robert Service, James Fallon, the first president of Ukraine Leonid Kravchuk, the first state secretary of Russia Gennady Burbulis, Chairman of the Supreme Soviet of the Republic of Belarus Stanislav Shushkevich, UK Ambassador to USSR Sir Roderick Braithwaite, West German Ambassador to USSR Andreas Meyer-Landrut, the former Chief of Staff of the Armed Forces of the United Kingdom, Sir Michael David Jackson, former publicity director at Sinn Féin Danny Morrison and others. The conferences took place in London School of Economics and Political Science, House of Commons, House of Lords, London Royal Society. They continued in Paris at the premiere of the project in 2019. In 2019, at premiere of the project in Paris, conferences continued with the participation of writer Jonathan Littell, futurologist Real Miller, professor of physics and string theorist Nikita Nekrasov, writer and social critic Evgeny Morozov, photographer Reza Deghati, biophysicist prof. Sonia Contera, writer Alexander Etkind, and others.

=== Complex Installations ===
The Institute. Complex installations have been an integral part of the project since the Institute functioned during the shooting, creating immersive experiences for visitors and residents.

Berlin. An installation supposed to take place at the planned Berlin premiere of the project in 2018 was cancelled by the city authorities referring to safety and technical issues. The concept was to rebuild a part of the Berlin wall to create 'a closed-off mini-state, complete with visa checks for visitors'. On this closed territory visitors were to immerse into performances and concerts of artists including Romeo Castellucci, Carsten Höller, Massive Attack and in particular a performance by Marina Abramović and Teodor Currentzis who planned to wash people referring to the procedure in concentration camps where prisoners were taken to gaz cameras, being told that they were going to take shower. The event was supposed to end with a ritual destruction of The Wall with each participant to be offered to carry a piece of the wall with them.

The premiere of the project in Paris also took a form of installation in Théâtre du Châtelet and Théâtre de la Ville that both hosted Serguey Diaghilev's Russian Seasons a century earlier, as well as in Centre Pompidou, that also provided contemporary art works by Soviet and Russian artists from its collection Kollektsia! to be used as a part of an installation in the theatres. Round-the-clock screenings of the films were accompanied by performances, concerts, installations and conferences; visitors could also visit a canteen, bars, a Soviet shop and have one-to-one sessions with 'active listeners'.

=== Dau.Digital ===
Khrzhanovsky claims the movies are just trailers of what he calls the main product Dau.Digital, an interactive online platform presenting all 700 hours of rushes where a user is navigated by the tags and can structure their own narrative. This format was also presented to the visitors of the Paris premiere.

=== Gallery and museum exhibitions ===
In 2025, DAU was included in The Quantum Effect, a group exhibition co-curated by Daniel Birnbaum and Jacqui Davies at the newly opened SMAC San Marco Art Centre in Venice, alongside works by Jeff Koons, Isa Genzken, Marcel Duchamp/Man Ray and others.

=== Babyn Yar ===
In 2019 Khrzhanovsky accepted the offer made by the supervisory board of the Babyn Yar Holocaust Memorial Center (BYHMC) to take up the position of the project's Artistic Director. The funding of the Memorial Center is carried out on the principle of equal participation of Ukrainian and international donors. As of 2020 the organisation had six donors: three citizens of Ukraine, two citizens with citizenship of the Russian Federation and Israel and one citizen of the USA.

In September 2020 on the 79th anniversary of the tragedy in Babyn Yar in the presence of Ukraine's President Volodymyr Zelenskyy, BYHMC unveiled the Mirror Field audiovisual outdoor memorial installation.

In January 2021 BYHMC presented the creative concept of the memorial that resulted from the work of an international group of authors consisting of architects, historians, museum curators, artists and Holocaust researchers recognised in Ukraine and internationally. Khrzhanovsky leads the general framework of the project.

On 27 January 2021, International Holocaust Remembrance Day, President Zelenskyy unveiled the A Glimpse into the Past monument at Babyn Yar, commissioned by BYHMC and created by Ukrainian artist and architect Anna Kamyshan, marking the beginning of the 80th anniversary commemorations. Zelenskyy also approved the establishment of an organizing committee for the 80th anniversary, co-chaired by Andrii Yermak and Denys Shmyhal.

On 14 May 2021, The Day of Remembrance of Ukrainians who rescued Jews during WWII, the memorial unveiled a pop-up synagoge. The inauguration was attended by the Head of the Presidential Office of Ukraine Andrii Yermak, the Prime Minister of Ukraine Denys Shmygal, Ukraine's Chief Rabbi Moche Reuven Azmann and other state officials, diplomats, religious leaders and cultural and social activists. In October 2021 the project received the international Dezeen architectural award becoming a public vote winner for Cultural Building of the Year.

In July 2021 Ilya Khrzhanovsky with the participation of Marina Abramović presented the final concept of BYHMC and the plans for its development at the All Ukrainian forum 'Ukraine 30 - Humanitarian Policy' with Volodymir Zelenskyy announcing the project's timeframe.

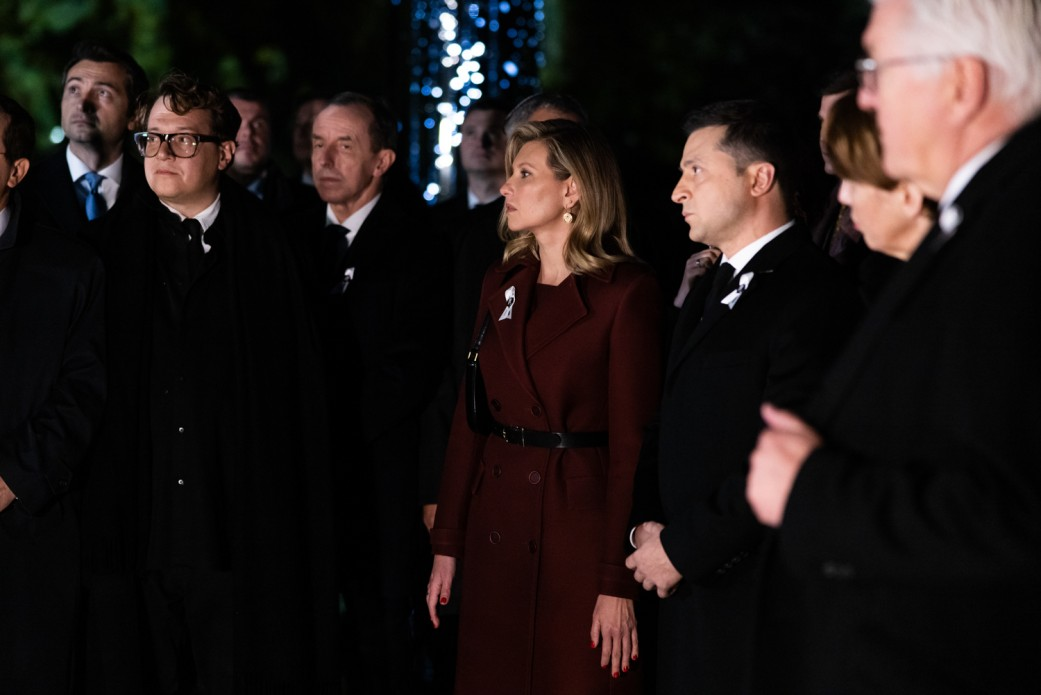
Khrzhanovsky (left) with Olena Zelenska and President Volodymyr Zelenskyy at the 80th anniversary ceremony of the Babyn Yar massacre, 6 October 2021. German President Frank-Walter Steinmeier on the right.

On 6 October 2021 in the presence of the presidents of Ukraine, Israel and Germany The Crystal Wall of Crying interactive installation by Marina Abramović, commissioned by BYHMC, was unveiled. The official state ceremony marking the 80th anniversary was attended by the presidents of Ukraine, Israel and Germany, as well as the speakers of the parliaments of Georgia, Sweden and Poland. The ceremony was accompanied by the Dmitri Shostakovich's Symphony No.13 performed for the first time in Babyn Yar by the German Symphony Orchestra and was linked to the 80th anniversary of the tragedy.

The projects of BYHMC have also been awarded with Webby Awards, international prizes in human rights, in Jewish journalism and others.

In 2021 Khrzhanovsky produced Sergei Loznitsa's documentary Babi Yar. Context. The movie won the Golden Eye award at Cannes Festival, and was awarded at Jerusalem Film Festival, at the 57th Chicago International Film Festival, at BFI London Film Festival, at 31st Message to Man International Film Festival, and was shortlisted by European Film Awards as best documentary.

In 2022, Khrzhanovsky co-produced Sergei Loznitsa's documentary The Kiev Trial, which premiered out of competition at the 79th Venice International Film Festival.

In September 2023 Khrzhanovsky made a public statement that he had left the post of artistic director of the Memorial Center, telling that "the war has changed and will continue to change many things in the perception and building of the culture of memory in Ukraine"; "in the current context the stage of his activities is completed" and he "does not consider it right to work in Ukraine, not physically living there or sharing all the troubles and dangers with Ukrainian society". The statement was commented on social media by Natan Shcharansky, the head of the supervisory board of BYHMC Charitable Foundation, a former political prisoner in the Soviet Union, human rights activist, who in particular mentioned "it is difficult to overestimate your contribution to this most important project for the Jewish people and for Ukraine"

== Personal life and views ==
Khrzhanovsky is the grandson of artist and actor Yury Khrzhanovsky (1905—1987). His father Andrei Khrzhanovsky (b. 1939) is one of the top Russian animation directors, and his mother Mariya Neyman is a philologist and script editor. His mother was born in Vinnytsia, Ukraine, and her family fled the city ahead of the Nazi advance during World War II.

His son Andrey (b. 1998) is a Russian-Israeli journalist and an anti-Israel activist documenting Israeli settler violence in the West Bank.

Since 2007, Khrzhanovsky has permanently resided outside of Russia, namely in Germany, Ukraine and the United Kingdom. As of March 2022, he was in Israel. As of 2025, he is based in Berlin.

=== Political views ===
In March 2014, he signed the open letter "We are with you!" issued by the Russian Film Union in support of Ukraine, and since February 2022 has consistently opposed the Russian invasion of Ukraine. Subsequently, hundreds of Russian citizens have joined the appeal. Initially posted on the Facebook page of Mikhail Zygar, after 4 March 2022 when the 'fake news law' entered into force, the text was removed from the page as well as from some other online media.

On 3 March 2022, commenting during a live broadcast on TV Rain channel about a Russian missile strike that hit Babyn Yar, Khrzhanovskiy said 'the whole of Ukraine has turned into Babi Yar'.

The interview that Volodymyr Zelenskyy gave to the opposition Russian journalists on 27 March 2022 was arranged on Khrzhanovsky's initiative.

In March 2024, the Russian Ministry of Justice added Ilya Khrzhanovsky to the list of foreign agents in Russia. In September 2024, Khrzhanovsky renounced his Russian citizenship.

== Criticism ==
Since the Paris premiere of DAU in 2019 Khrzhanovsky's methods have been criticized, in particular from the point of view of engaging and working with non-actors.

In April 2020 a draft presentation of the creative concept of BYHMC was leaked to the press that presented it as a final creative solution. This provoked a scandal; some public figures called for dismissal of Khrzhanovskiy, referring to the assumptions made about DAU project. The Head of Scientific Council Karel Berkhoff and the CEO Yana Bariniva left the project as a mark of protest against the approach reflected in the concept. In response, the Memorial Center issued a statement saying: 'All accusations addressed now to Ilya Khrzhanovsky are made based on emotions and subjective thoughts built upon speculations and assumptions' and called the media and public to 'be objective and balanced'.

On 27 May 2020 The Jerusalem Post published an article by Khrzhanovskiy saying: 'This interpretation has no connection whatsoever to the artistic spirit that I am striving to embody in the project'. He also stressed that he stayed fully committed to the frame of historical narrative that had been elaborated by scholars and pointed at the difference between methods he had used when working on the DAU arthouse project and those appropriate for dealing with the memory of Babyn Yar tragedy.

== Honors ==
=== Stop (1998) (Co-directed with Artyom Mikhalkov) ===
- Jury Prize, short movie, Primagaz Group Prize, International Film Festival in Saint-Pierre-des-Corps, France (1999)
- Jury Prize, International Film Festival Youth, Kyiv, Ukraine (1999)
- Jury Prize, student/debut feature film, St Anna festival, Moscow, Russia (1999)

=== 4 (2004) ===
- Tiger Award and the Golden Cactus at The International Film Festival Rotterdam (2005)
- Best Director Prize at the Buenos Aires International Festival of Independent Cinema (2005)
- Grand Jury Prize as Best New Director at the Seattle International Film Festival (2005)
- Best Film and Best Camera Prize at the Transilvania International Film Festival (2005)
- Best Director Prize at the Athens International Film Festival (2005)
- Nominated for Fassbinder Prize Film Award (2005)

=== DAU (2019) ===
- Selected for European Film Market, Sofia, Bulgaria (2005)
- Selected as one of the 18 best world projects at the Atelier of the Cannes Film Festival (2006)
- Included in the best 10 projects at International Film Festival CineMart (2006, Rotterdam, Netherlands)
- 4th out of 10 best movies of 2019 selected by Film Art magazine
- «Silver Bear» for Outstanding Artistic Contribution at the 70th Berlin International Film Festival to сinematographer Jürgen Jürges(2020).
- Dau. Degeneration - rated 2 in Berlinale critics ratings (2020).
- Dau. Degeneration - rated 1 in the list of the best movies of the first half of 2020 by independent online magazine for film, cinema&TV Film plus Kritik
- DAU. Natasha - Feature Film Selection 2020 by European Film Academy(2020).
- DAU. Natasha. European Film Academy: Natalia Berezhnaya nominated European Actress 2020, (2020).
- Dau. Degeneration: Grand Prix at The Festival of Auteur Cinema in Belgrade (2020).
- DAU. Natasha - Official Selection at The Seville European Film Festival(2020).
- DAU. Natasha - Official Selection at Palić European Film Festival(2020)
- DAU. Natasha - Official Selection at Riga International Film Festival(2020).
- Dau. Degeneration - Official Selection at Ostrava Film Festival(2020).
- Dau. Degeneration - The Third International Film Award "East – West. The Golden Arch": Best Cinematography, Jürgen Jürges (2021).

=== DAU (2026) ===
Khrzhanovsky receiving his Silver Lion

- Selected for the Venezia 83 competition, 83rd Venice International Film Festival (2026)
- Silver Lion for Best Director at the 83rd Venice International Film Festival (2026)
- Premio Bisato D'Oro for Best Film from an independent film critics' jury to Khrzhanovsky and cinematographer Jürgen Jürges.
- Cinema and Arts Award for Best Multidisciplinary Artist: Anatoli Vasiliev for DAU (2026).

=== Other awards ===
- Master Award, Golden Apricot Yerevan International Film Festival, for outstanding achievement in film art (2022).

=== Babyn Yar Holocaust Memorial Center ===
- The Award for Excellence in Writing About Jewish Heritage and Jewish Peoplehood in Europe, Simon Rockower Award» to Israel Kasnett for a series of stories on the Babi Yar and the Babyn Yar Holocaust Memorial Center (2022)
- Cultural Building of the Year: International Dezeen architectural award (2021)
- Grand Prix Red Dot Award: Brands & Communication Design for Martirology of the Russian-Ukrainian war victims (2022)
- Webby Winner, Websites and Mobile Sites Charitable Organizations/Non-Profit (2023)
- Webby Awards: People's Voice Winner, Websites and Mobile Sites Charitable Organizations/Non-Profit (2023)
- Thomas J. Dodd Prize in International Justice and Human Rights (2023)

=== Babi Yar. Context by Sergei Loznitsa ===
- Golden Eye, Cannes Film Festival (2021)
- Chantal Akerman Prize for best foreign documentary, Jerusalem Film Festival (2021)
- Silver Hugo Prize for Best Documentary, 57th Chicago International Film Festival (2021)
- Special commendation, BFI London Film Festival (2021)
- European Film Awards, Shortlist - European Documentary 2021 & Documentary Selection 2021 for the best documentary
- Golden Centaur Grand Prix, Message to Man International Film Festival (2021)
- 2025 Sarajevo Film Festival – A special guest at the festival, his retrospective was presented in "Tribute To" program of the festival.
