= Dau (film) =

2026 drama film by Ilya Khrzhanovsky

DAU
- Directed by: Ilya Khrzhanovsky
- Screenplay by: Ilya Khrzhanovsky; Vladimir Sorokin; Susanna Marian; Ilya Permyakov
- Produced by: Ilya Khrzhanovsky; Philippe Bober; Leonid Lebedev
- Starring: Teodor Currentzis; Radmila Shchogolieva
- Cinematography: Jürgen Jürges; Manuel Alberto Claro; Lol Crawley
- Edited by: Ilya Permyakov; Rob Myers
- Production companies: Phenomen Berlin; Essential Films; Parisienne de Production; Plattform Produktion; Arte France Cinéma; Westdeutscher Rundfunk; IP Filmworks
- Release date: 9 September 2026 (Venice)
- Running time: 195 minutes
- Countries: Germany; France; Sweden; Russia
- Languages: Russian; English; Greek

DAU is a 2026 drama film directed by Ilya Khrzhanovsky. Inspired by the lives of Soviet physicists who developed the atomic bomb, the film follows the brilliant scientist Dau across four decades of life in the Soviet Union, from 1928 to 1968.

A co-production of Germany, France, Sweden, and Russia, it assembles footage shot between 2008 and 2011, together with additional material filmed in 2024, into a single feature over a production history spanning more than two decades. As the director's statement puts it, "the starting point was my interest in the human being — in our ability to love, to create and to be free, to make moral choices and to experience happiness in a world where a totalitarian system gradually changes human nature itself."

The film had its world premiere in the main competition of the 83rd Venice International Film Festival on 9 September 2026, where Khrzhanovsky won the Silver Lion for Best Director.

== Premise ==
The action unfolds largely inside a closed Soviet research institute, where scientific hierarchy, privilege and constant surveillance define daily existence. As his room for independent action narrows, Dau seeks release in a succession of affairs outside his marriage, a pattern that gradually costs him his attachments and his sense of self. The narrative covers the four decades from 1928 to 1968.

"Driven to understand the laws of the universe, Dau is soon forced to use his genius in service of the state and help create the deadliest weapon in history. [...] DAU is both an intimate portrait of one man and a monumental fresco of a society shaped by violence and ideology."

== Cast ==
- Teodor Currentzis
- Radmila Shchogolieva
- Anatoly Vasiliev
- Vladimir Azhippo
- Dmitri Tcherniakov
- Dmitry Cheglakov
- Demian Kudryavtsev
- Maria Nafpliotou
- Ekaterina Andreeva
- Victoriia Skytska
- Konstantin Leshan
- Ekaterina Pachkovskaya
- Alexei Blinov
- Aleksey Trifonov
- Peteris Kimelis
- Dmitry Kaledin
- Nikita Nekrasov
- Alexander Migdal
- David Gross
- Carlo Rovelli
- James H. Fallon
- Peter Sellars
- Daniil Ishmatov
- Yuriy Alekseev
- Pavel Gordienko
- Vladimir Yermolenko
- Nikolay Voronov
- Anna Volkova
- Andrey Losev
- Fyodor Sofronov

The film also features performances by Carsten Höller, Marina Abramović, and Romeo Castellucci as themselves.

== Development ==
=== Project markets, fundraising and financing ===
In 2005, the project was named the best project at the European project market Sofia Meetings, held as part of the Sofia International Film Festival in Bulgaria, and was selected among the ten leading projects at the international co-production market of the International Film Festival Rotterdam, the Netherlands. In 2006, it was chosen as one of 18 leading projects worldwide for the international film workshop at the Cannes Film Festival, France. In 2006, the film’s co-producers included Philippe Bober and Susanne Marian, (Essential Filmproduktion, Germany, and Société Parisienne de Production, France), Phenomen Films, Medienboard Berlin-Brandenburg (Germany), WDR/Arte (Germany), Arte France Cinéma (France), Mitteldeutsche Medienförderung (Germany), Eurimages, The Swedish Film Institute (Sweden), Film i Väst (Sweden), Hubert Bals Fund (the Netherlands). The production was later supported by private funding, which was halted in 2019.

Ukrainian State Film Agency allocated funding for one of the Dau project films in 2012. In April 2018, one of the films in the DAU project was submitted to the Ukrainian State Film Agency commission.

The Ministry of Culture of the Russian Federation allocated 22.5 million rubles for the film in 2006. In 2015, the subsidy was returned to the Ministry in full, with interest of 8 million rubles.

=== Screenplay ===
Work on the screenplay was begun by Ilya Khrzhanovsky together with Vladimir Sorokin; during production, particularly in the Moscow filming block, the plot began to develop according to its own internal logic, structured around dramatic turning points.

=== Casting ===
In 2005, Khrzhanovsky co-founded Phenomen Films company that launched the REKA project, the "Russian Unified Casting Agency," under which thousands of interviews with professional actors were recorded across approximately 57 regions of Russia, using a method developed by theatre director Boris Yukhananov. During this work, Khrzhanovsky decided to cast non-professional performers in Dau: "There are almost no actors in ‘Dau.’ If there are any, they were chosen for reasons entirely unrelated to their professional abilities. Face. Energy. Substance." "I invite people who carry a destiny, a consciousness, and a meaning behind them." The film’s only professional actress, Radmila Shchogolieva, who worked specifically before filming to shed her habitual acting strategies, was cast only after filming had already begun in Kharkiv. This approach shaped a working method that ultimately produced a character database of 392,000 people. Conductor Teodor Currentzis was invited to play Dau as a personality whose scale and temperament were comparable to those of the character. The older Dau was played by another person, the artist Yuri Alexeev.

=== The material world ===
The decision to work with non-professional performers placed particular emphasis on creating a material world that would enable them to reveal themselves: a world at once exhaustively detailed and invented. "I must create conditions for the person playing a particular role that allow them to enter the frame with the whole of the life they had before me", as the director put it. Every prop—including tableware, small household objects, food, packaging, and bags—was either made or selected to correspond to the period depicted, even when it appeared only in the background or remained entirely outside the frame.

=== Artistic language ===
Filming was divided into three blocks corresponding to stages in the title character’s life: Leningrad, Kharkiv, and Moscow. Each was defined by its own aesthetic at the level of the material world being created—architecture and interiors, costumes, makeup, and hairstyles—as well as casting and cinematography. All three principal cinematographers on the project were non-Russian speakers. For the director, this was important in order to obtain "a different gaze," "somewhat detached, yet directed toward revealing the substance". From the outset, the decision was made to shoot on 35 mm film—in cinematographer Jürgen Jürges’ account, in order to reproduce a "gaze" characteristic of the period in which the story takes place. The preparatory period took place in 2006 and involved extensive archival research and location scouting. Filming began in 2007.

== Production ==
=== Leningrad shooting block (2008) ===
The palette of the Leningrad filming block, set in 1928, was "borrowed from the paintings of Pavel Filonov." Lol Crawley contributed as cinematographer, and Boris Shapovalov as production designer. The costumes were designed by Alexandra Smolina, Alexandra Timofeeva, Lyubov Mingazitinova, Irina Tsvetkova, and Stefania Gaurogkaitė. During the Moscow filming block, sisters Olga Bekritskaya and Elena Bekritskaya joined the team, while Stefania Gaurogkaitė’s involvement was limited to the first filming block. The scale and methods used to create the street scenes and crowd sequences from the early period of Dau’s life, filmed in this block, were developed further in the Kharkiv block.

=== Kharkiv shooting block (2008–2009) ===
The Kharkiv period, covering 1932–1938, is characterized by a gradual reduction in colour intensity and by crumpled, yielding textures—"the world of little earthen people". The cinematographer was Manuel Alberto Claro, who specifically emphasized the role of Constructivist architecture in shaping the visual language. Later in this filming block, Jürgen Jürges took over as cinematographer. The production designer for the Kharkiv block was Olga Gurevich. The search for participants, premises, vehicles, and props began approximately a year and a half before the first location shoot. By October 2008, around 50,000 people had taken part in casting. More than 180,000 photographs of city residents were taken during the search—in schools, institutions, public transport, and on the streets. The filming block began in autumn 2008; one of its first major scenes was shot on Poltavskyi Shliakh on 17–19 October.

=== Work with the urban environment and the creation of art objects ===
More than 35 urban spaces and sites were used for filming, including Poltavskyi Shliakh, Station Square, Kharkiv Zoo, Vorobiov Lane, Sumska Street and the area around the Taras Shevchenko monument, Freedom Square, Darwin and Krasnoarmeyskaya streets, the Railway Workers’ Palace of Culture, Derzhprom, and others. For the scene of Dau’s arrival in Kharkiv, a full-scale replica of the K-7 aircraft was constructed, approximately 12 metres high with a wingspan of 54 metres. For all location filming, city sites and spaces were altered so that they would become part of the artistic universe of Dau: modern window units and façades were given period textures, streetlights were draped, asphalt was covered with gravel, modern signs were removed and replaced with historical ones. Vintage cars, trams, motorcycles, bicycles, horse-drawn vehicles, and railway rolling stock were used in crowd scenes. In June 2009, an episode featuring a train styled after the 1930s was filmed near the Southern Railway Station. The train was brought to the location along tram tracks; the locomotive was built by the Dau art department. According to the recollections of the Kharkiv Vintage Car Club director, the production used eighteen cars, three motorcycles, and one bicycle. The vehicles were not only restored but also modified: fenders, headlights, and other exterior elements were replaced. The search for flat pre-war headlight glass and suitable tyres took around eight months. The fenders of some trucks were remade from scratch. Sound engineers recorded the original engine sound of a ZIS-5 truck separately. For the K-7 aircraft scene, approximately fifteen truckloads of black soil were delivered to the airfield. The soil was mixed with water and diesel fuel to create deep mud through which people and vehicles had to move, with chains fitted to their wheels. For the scene in Vorobiov Lane in which Dau is beaten, seventy tonnes of cabbage were purchased and covered with cement.

=== Crowd scenes ===
The first major Kharkiv crowd scene was filmed on Poltavskyi Shliakh. The filming area extended for approximately six kilometres: modern advertising along the street was covered, the streetlights were redesigned, and period cars, trams, and market stalls were installed. The crowd-scene area was divided into sectors, each supervised by a separate director or foreman. Participants were assigned specific routes and actions: reading a newspaper, carrying bread, buying food, repairing a cart, eating sunflower seeds, talking, or crossing the street. As a result, numerous small, self-contained episodes unfolded simultaneously within the overall movement of the street. Transport followed a specially organized circular route so that cars and carts could repeatedly re-enter the frame. Individual scenes were repeated ten to fifteen times; when the result was unsatisfactory, filming was postponed until the following day. Additional sound effects were recorded after the image: the creaking of carts, tools at work, moving mechanisms, and the sound of old engines.

Also in 2008, construction of the Institute set on the site of the former Dynamo swimming pool was launched. It became the principal and defining location for the entire next block — the Moscow shooting block.

=== Мoscow shooting block (2009–2011) ===
==== The artistic world and the Institute set ====
The Institute was designed by production designer Denis Shibanov. Filming in the Institute began in 2009. The artistic world of the Moscow block, spanning 1938–1968, encompasses several aesthetic periods: the dark colours of the 1940s; exaggerated, heavy, "petrified" silhouettes in the 1950s; a "uniform" style in the second half of the 1950s; and vivid dark colours—in contrast to the light palette of the Leningrad period—in the 1960s, when the protagonist as we knew him in his earlier life disappears, and in his place emerges a helpless old man. The set became the largest in Europe; by the end of filming it covered 12,000 square metres. It operated around the clock, irrespective of the shooting schedule. For the project, principal DoP Jürgen Jürges developed a lighting system that made it possible to film anywhere at any time without setting up lighting equipment. This made it possible to abandon a conventionally staged approach: the camera recorded the characters’ lives and their interactions within the logic of the artistic world, while treating them as the realization of the participants’ own decisions. A newspaper editorial office, laboratories, a canteen, residential buildings, the First Department, a hairdresser’s, and administrative and maintenance facilities all operated fully within the Institute; the employees of these services were paid in Soviet roubles. A total of 40,000 costume elements were produced or acquired for filming. The Institute was "a hyperbole, a Platonic idea, the artistic structure of Stalinist Empire style—not a reconstruction or even an imitation"; "the quintessence of a phantasmagorical projection of the Soviet era. In it, everything is invented and everything is authentic at the same time". Architecture, sets, costumes, the material world, and sound created a phantasmagorical reconstruction of Soviet life from the 1930s to the 1960s, within which the characters existed. The same applied to hairstyles. This aspect of the characters’ appearance was created by makeup artist Ekaterina Oertel, who joined the production during the Kharkiv block. She saw her task as reflecting the individuality of each participant, so that it would be clear that this particular person would have chosen that hairstyle in the past. A special challenge was the creation of ageing makeup for characters who "grew older" as the story progressed, particularly Nora and Dau.

==== Dau and the other characters in the Institute ====
All participants except Dau, his wife Nora, their son —played in adulthood by musician Nikolai Voronov — and Krupitsa, the Institute’s director from 1938 to 1953—played by theatre director Anatoly Vasiliev — appeared in the Institute under their own names. They included scientists, artists, musicians, philosophers, religious figures, and mystics, alongside cooks, waiters, cleaners, nurses, hairdressers, and security-service personnel. Their real biographies were adapted to Soviet circumstances. In particular the process was contributed by Profs. Nobel laureate David Gross, Fields Medal winner Shing-Tung Yau, Nikita Nekrasov, Dmitry Kaledin, Andrey Losev, Samson Shatashvili, Carlo Rovelli, Eric Verlinde, James H. Fallon, and other scientists; by modern artists such as Marina Abramović, Carsten Höller, Boris Mikhailov, Peter Sellars, Romeo Castellucci, Alexei Blinov, spiritual leaders such as Rav Steinsaltz, Peruvian shaman Guillermo Arévalo and others.

According to Currentzis, he spent approximately two years inside the Institute, with interruptions, and could live there continuously for days or weeks at a time: eating, sleeping, and working within the space around the clock. There was no possibility of briefly stepping out, checking email, and immediately returning. He also mentioned that his freedom of action and choice as a character within the Institute was inseparable from the logic of the consequences of those actions in the artistic world — for example, detention by the security services. At this stage the film was joined by another professional actress, Maria Nafpliotou, who played Maria, Dau's former lover, visiting him at the Institute. In November 2011 this part of the shooting was finished and the location of the Institute was destroyed, with the destruction itself becoming a part of the story.

=== Further work ===
Philippe Bober of Coproduction Office and Ilya Khrzhanovsky restarted working on the film in 2022. The existing footage was supplemented by additional filming completed in 2024, and the film was subsequently shaped from the entirety of this material. The production is financed by Phenomen Berlin, Essential Filmproduktion GmbH, Société Parisienne de Production, Plattform Produktion, Arte France Cinéma, and IP Filmworks, a company established by Philippe Bober and Ilya Khrzhanovsky specifically to produce DAU.

== Release ==
Dau premiered in the main competition of the 83rd Venice International Film Festival on 9 September 2026, where it will compete for the Golden Lion.

=== Controversy over participation in the Venice Film Festival ===
On 17 August 2026, the Ministry of Culture of Ukraine and the Ministry of Foreign Affairs of Ukraine issued a joint statement concerning the inclusion of Dau in the main competition of the 83rd Venice International Film Festival. The ministries expressed concern over the film's participation, describing it as a project connected to the Russian state and its "networks of influence". The statement said that the project had been financed by Russian businessman Sergey Adonyev, who is subject to United States and Ukrainian sanctions; that Khrzhanovsky had headed an unnamed cultural project financed by Russian oligarchs whom the authors linked to the Kremlin; and that lead actor Teodor Currentzis had obtained Russian citizenship and cooperated with Russian state financial and cultural institutions. The statement also criticised the depiction of Kharkiv exclusively within a Soviet context, describing this as part of a Russian imperial interpretation of Ukrainian history. The ministries stated that they were not calling for censorship, but argued that the sources of financing of cultural projects and their political context should be taken into account.

On 18 August, La Biennale di Venezia issued a rebuttal in which it stated that Dau was a German-produced film, with France and Sweden as co-producing countries. The Biennale also noted that Khrzhanovsky had renounced his Russian citizenship, held German, British and Israeli citizenship, and had publicly opposed the Russian invasion of Ukraine. Regarding Adonyev, it said that he had financed the broader DAU project, but that his involvement had ended in 2019 and that he had not financed the film selected for the Venice competition. The Biennale described the film as a work dealing with totalitarianism and reiterated that it did not exclude participants from its events on the basis of geographical origin or nationality.

On 19 August, the festival's artistic director, Alberto Barbera, issued a separate and more strongly worded response. He said that the accusations against the Biennale and the film were based on false premises and a manipulation of reality, and described the attack as unacceptable. Barbera stressed that Dau was neither a Russian film nor pro-Putin propaganda, but a work denouncing totalitarian regimes and their intrusion into private life. He described Khrzhanovsky as a dissident targeted by the Russian regime and noted that the director had opposed the invasion of Ukraine from the outset. Barbera also questioned criticism of a film that, he said, its accusers had evidently not yet seen, and described the attack on the Biennale as gratuitous and unjustified. He linked the festival's position to the defence of freedom of expression irrespective of geographical origin or nationality.

On 20 August, Khrzhanovsky published a detailed response on his Facebook. He said that the Ukrainian statement contained "factually incorrect assertions and substantial distortions" concerning the film's origins and financing, its relationship to the Russian state, the people involved in the project, and his own position and activities. Khrzhanovsky stated that Dau was participating in competition as a German film co-produced with France and Sweden and that, for the previous seven years, it had received no funding from the Russian state, Russian state institutions, companies linked to the Russian state, or private investors currently residing in Russia. He also stated that he had renounced his Russian citizenship in protest against Russian state policy and the war against Ukraine, had publicly supported Ukraine since 2014, and had been designated a “foreign agent” in Russia.

Khrzhanovsky further stated that Adonyev had financed the broader DAU project until 2019, but not the film selected for Venice. Regarding Currentzis, he noted that Currentzis had acquired Russian citizenship in 2014, several years after most of his filming for DAU, and argued that citizenship should not be used either to judge a person or as evidence of the film's current connection to the Russian state. Referring to the unnamed "cultural project" in the Ukrainian statement, Khrzhanovsky identified it as the Babyn Yar Holocaust Memorial Center in Kyiv, where he had served as artistic director. He referred to its international supervisory board, its financing structure, support from Ukrainian public officials, and the international recognition of its activities, including Sergei Loznitsa's documentaries Babi Yar. Context and The Kiev Trial, which Khrzhanovsky produced as part of his work with the Center. He also rejected the interpretation of the filming in Kharkiv as a denial of Ukrainian identity, stating that the film dealt with the effects of the Soviet totalitarian system on the individual. He concluded by noting that the film had not yet had its world premiere and had not yet been seen by the public, and argued that a film "should not be prematurely judged on the basis of false associations, distorted chronology, or assumptions that contradict the documented history of the project".

== Reception ==
=== Critical response ===
Metacritic, which uses a weighted average, assigned the film a score of 92 out of 100, based on 6 critics, indicating "universal acclaim".

=== Awards and nominations ===
Award	Date of ceremony	Category	Recipient(s)	Result	Ref.
Venice Film Festival	September 12, 2026	Golden Lion	Ilya Khrzhanovsky	Nominated	
Venice Film Festival	September 12, 2026	Silver Lion	Ilya Khrzhanovsky	Won	
Venice Film Festival	September 12, 2026	Cinema & Arts Award for Best Multidisciplinary Artist	Anatoly Vasiliev	Won	
