= Yatsura =

Yatsura may refer to:

- yatsura or yatsu-ra, one of the informal Japanese pronouns
- Yelena Yatsura (born 1968), Russian film producer
- Urusei Yatsura (band), a Scottish band which used the name Yatsura in the United States and Japan

== See also ==
- Urusei Yatsura, a Japanese manga and anime franchise
