= DAU. Degeneration =

2019 film directed by Ilya Khrzhanovsky

- Directed by: Ilya Khrzhanovsky
- Written by: Ilya Khrzhanovsky; Kora Landau-Drobantseva (original book); Vladimir Sorokin; Susanne Marian
- Release date: January 25, 2019

DAU. Degeneration is a 2019 Russian film of the DAU project organised by Ilya Khrzhanovsky.

During the early stages of production, the film was marketed as a biopic about the life of the Nobel Prize-winning Soviet scientist Lev Landau. However, as production progressed, the concept of the film drastically evolved into an alternative Soviet history series. The character of Lev Landau as played by Teodor Currentzis appears only in the films DAU. Nora Mother, DAU. Katya Tanya, DAU. The Empire and DAU. Three Days.

The premiere in Paris on 25 January 2019 was in the form of a dozen feature films screened inside an extensive around-the-clock immersive installation. The film is one of Russia's largest and most controversial cinematic projects.

DAU. Degeneration premiered in the Berlinale Special program in 2020.

== Plot ==
Set between 1966 and 1968, the film portrays the final years of a secret Soviet scientific institute where boundary-pushing experiments in science and mysticism unravel into chaos. Following the incapacitation of Lev Landau, the institute's once-renowned chief scientist, the stern and authoritarian KGB general Vladimir Azhippo takes control as director. Under his rule, he clamps down on the institute's permissive culture, halting the debauched behavior of its researchers and the unchecked abuse by his predecessor. Despite these efforts, the institute remains a place of strange and unsettling activity, where experiments on animals, humans, and even infants seek to explore the limits of knowledge and creation. Amid the decaying institution, younger staff members rebel by embracing Western influences like rock and roll, but their dissent is swiftly met with punishment and conformity.

Azhippo's measures culminate in the arrival of a violent ultra-left-wing group, sponsored by the KGB to restore discipline and eliminate perceived degeneracy. What begins as intimidation escalates into a full-scale purge, as the neo-communist thugs wreak havoc on the institute, driven by racist, antisemitic, and homophobic ideologies. Their actions lead to the brutal extermination of the institute's staff and the destruction of its legacy.

== Cast ==
The actors' names and the characters' names are the same.

- Vladimir Azhippo as Azhippo, KGB General, Director of the Research Institute
- Dmitry Kaledin as Dmitry Kaledin, Scientist
- Olga Shkabarnya as Olya
- Maxim Martsinkevich as Maxim, Neo-Nazi
- Alexey Blinov as Professor Blinov
- Viktoriya Skitskaya as Viktoriya, Cafeteria Worker
- Kristina Babich as Kristina, Librarian
- Alexey Trifonov as Alexey Trifonov, Director of the Research Institute
- Adin Shteinzalts as Adin Shteinzalts

== Production ==
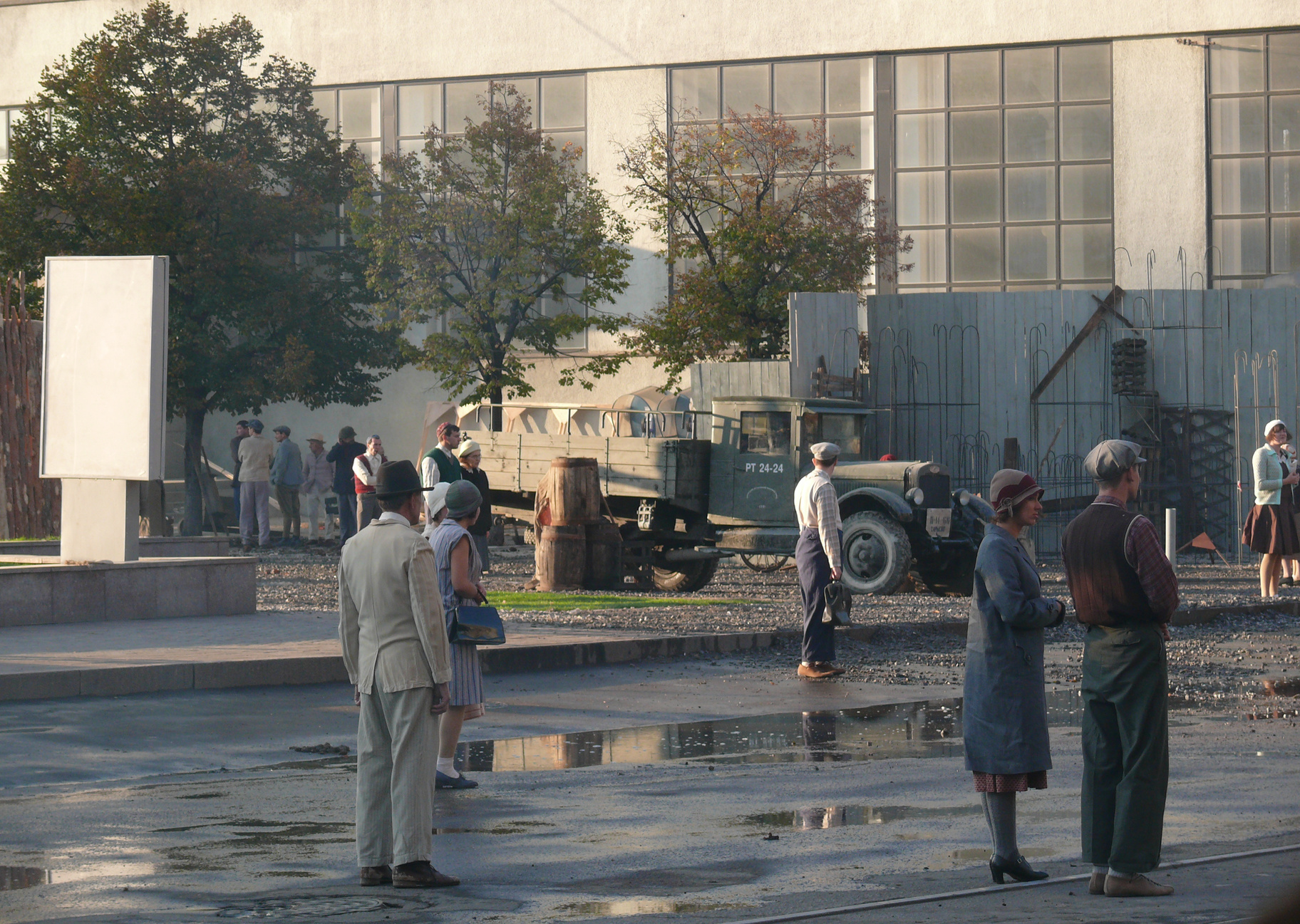
Filming in Kharkiv

The preparation for the shooting for the film began in 2006, whereas the actual shooting started in 2008 and went on for three years. In 2017, The Daily Telegraph reported that the film was still being edited and the production company was quoted as saying,

Our project consists of over 700 hours of material all shot on 35mm out of which the company is making feature films, TV series and a slate of science and art documentaries, as well as a trans-media project

— Phenomen Films,

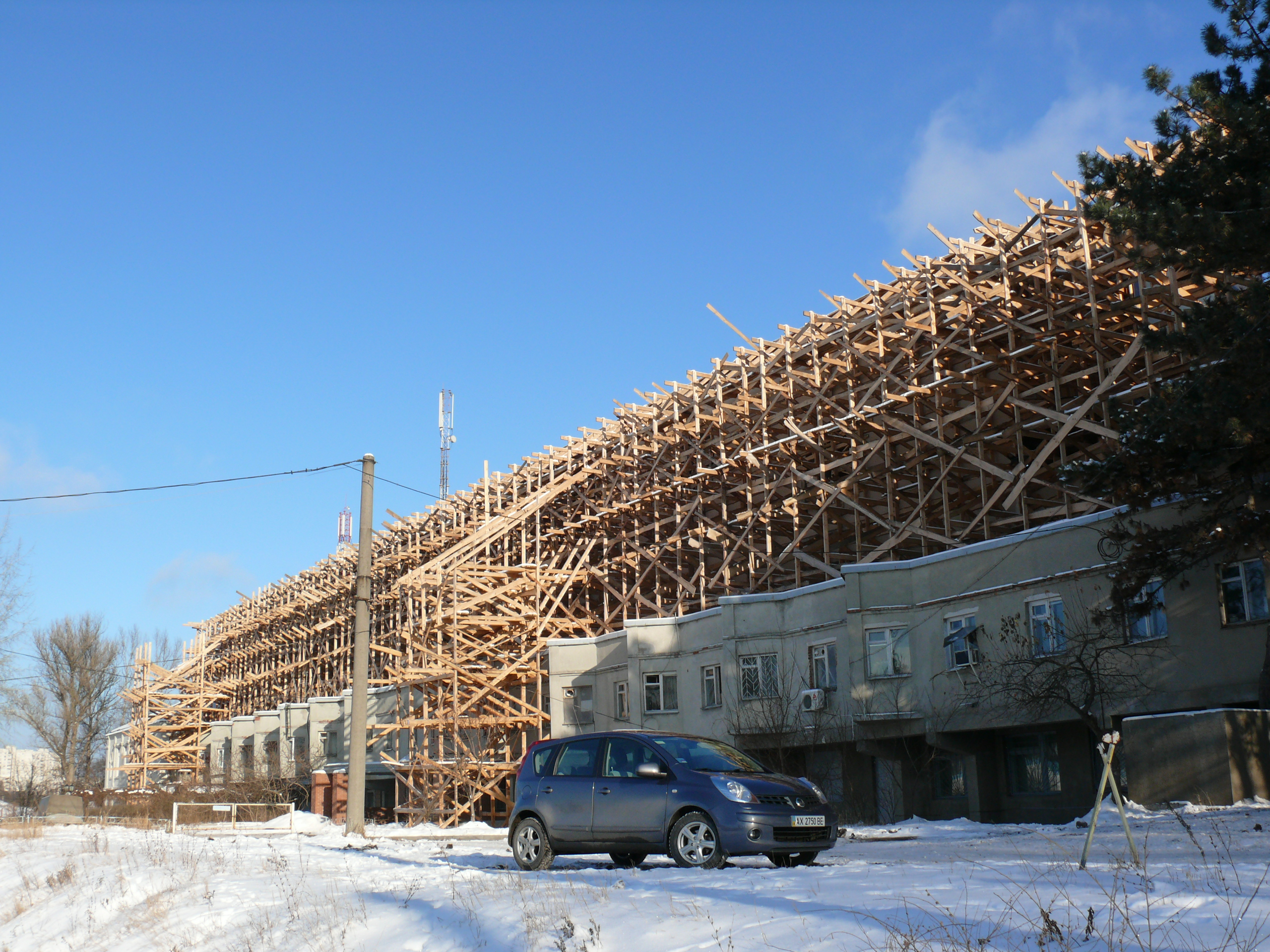
The Institute set

The film was shot at various sites in Azerbaijan, Russia, Ukraine, Germany, United Kingdom and Denmark. Most of the film was shot on a specially constructed set called "The Institute" in Kharkiv in northeastern Ukraine. The institute was the largest film set in Europe, the area totalling 12,000 m^{2}. The set was a dynamic creative reconstruction of a Soviet restricted-access Institute in 1938–1968, located in Moscow. The filming included performances by multiple personalities, including Russian neo-Nazi leader Maxim Martsinkevich. Some actors lived in The Institute in character 24 hours a day. The destruction of the set became an integral part of the story and was shot on 8 November 2011.

== Release ==
The release was scheduled for October 2018 in Berlin (with similar happenings following in Paris and London) as a month-long, full time operating, immersive art installation, featuring a replica of the Berlin Wall. The city ultimately did not approve the plans, as there was too little time for authorities to check for safety for an event of these proportions, with the production company having submitted the plans less than a month prior to the event.

The project finally premiered in Paris on 25 January 2019 in the form of 12 separate feature films screened inside an installation evoking The Institute and spanning the Centre Pompidou and two municipal theaters, the Théâtre du Châtelet and the Théâtre de la Ville. Instead of tickets, entry is by "visas" of 6 hours, 24 hours or an unlimited duration. In the latter two cases, the visit is personalized according to a psychometric questionnaire which the visitor is requested to fill on registration. Audiences walk into an intermediary space, halfway between ruins and a theater set that is both contemporary and Soviet. From dusk to dawn, the three sites are linked in the sky by the Red Triangle, a light sculpture inspired by the Russian avant-garde of the early 20th century. Additional presentations are planned in London and Berlin. In April 2020, the first two films in the series were released for paid online viewing, with an additional twelve films listed on the official website.

Tablet magazine critic Vladislav Davidzon wrote that with the massive immersive theater project "Khrzhanovsky has built a testament to a great film that will never be—and could never be. DAU is a massive success as a feat of will, but a massive failure of artistry and craftsmanship."

=== Berlinale premiere controversy ===
DAU. Degeneration premiered at Berlinale in the Berlinale Special program.

Prior to DAU. Natasha screening at the Berlin International Film Festival a group of Russian film critics published an open letter to festival leadership, questioning the ethical side of film's participation in Berlinale's competition program citing allegations of violence, both psychological and physical, towards cast members during the making of the film.

== See also ==
- DAU (project)
- DAU. Natasha
