= 4 (2004 film) =

- Theatrical release poster
- Directed by: Ilya Khrzhanovsky
- Written by: Vladimir Sorokin
- Produced by: Yelena Yatsura
- Starring: Marina Vovchenko; Sergey Shnurov; Yuri Laguta
- Cinematography: Sándor Berkesi; Alexandre Ilkhovski; Alisher Khamidkhodjaev
- Edited by: Igor Malakhov
- Distributed by: Filmocom; Hubert Bals Fund
- Release dates: 10 September 2004 (Venice); 8 December 2005 (Russia)
- Running time: 126 minutes
- Country: Russia
- Language: Russian

4 is a 2004 Russian drama film directed by Ilya Khrzhanovsky after a screenplay by Vladimir Sorokin. Originally it was conceived as a short film, but turned into a full-length film after four years of work.

== Plot ==
Meat merchant Oleg, prostitute Marina, and piano tuner "simply Volodya" drop into an all-night bar in Moscow, where they are served by a narcoleptic bartender (three plus one is four) while each regales the others with made-up biographies. Oleg claims to work in President Putin's administration, supplying him with bottled water and his wife with liquor; Marina passes herself off as a marketing executive; and Volodya, the infamous lead singer of the rock group Leningrad, as a geneticist who clones twins (two times two makes four, again) in a laboratory that has been engaged in these experiments since the days of Stalin. After they separate, these fantasy realities, especially Volodya's, begin to dominate their everyday lives.

== Cast ==
- Marina Vovchenko as Marina
- Sergey Shnurov as Volodya
- Yuri Laguta as Oleg
- Konstantin Murzenko as Marat
- Alexei Khvostenko as a Man with No Age
- Anatoly Adoskin as Oleg's Father
- Leonid Fyodorov as Sergey
- Andrey Kudryashov as a Bartender
- Shavkat Abdusalamov as a Meat-Processing Plant Manager
- Natalya Tetenova as Sveta
- Irina Vovchenko as Sonya
- Svetlana Vovchenko as Vera

== Reception ==
=== Critical response ===
On Metacritic, the film has a weighted average score of 72 out of 100, based on 10 critics, indicating "generally favorable reviews".

=== Awards ===
The film won the VPRO Tiger Award (shared with Daniele Gaglianone's Changing Destiny and Mercedes Álvarez's The Sky Turns) at the 34th International Film Festival Rotterdam.
