= Yelena Yatsura =

Russian film producer

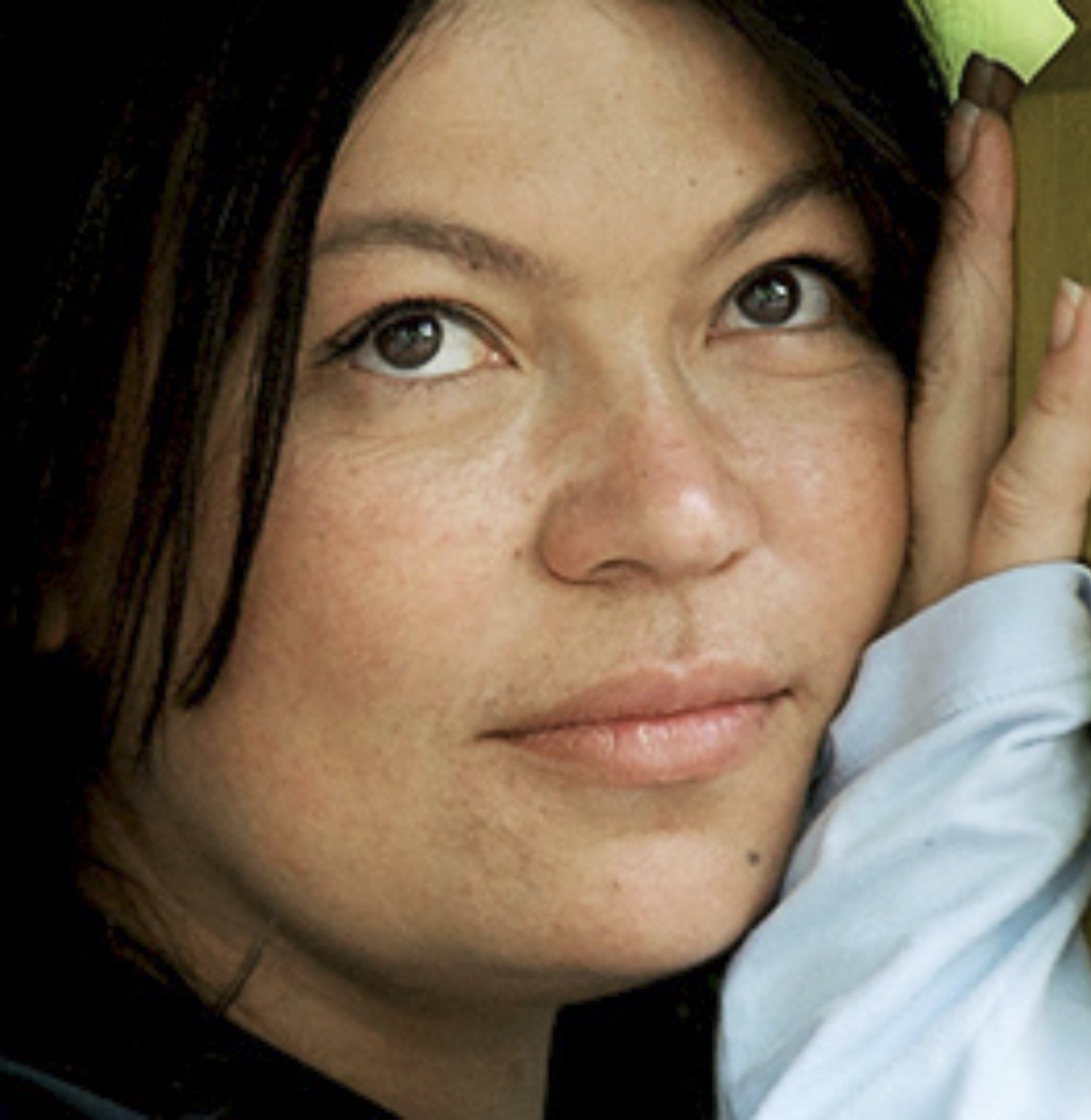
Yelena Yatsura in 2014

Yelena Borisovna Yatsura (Russian: Елена Борисовна Яцура) is an independent Russian film producer.

== Career ==
Yatsura has collaborated with “Slovo”, “Non-Stop Production”, “Bogwood Kino” and “Filmocom” film companies.

She has produced debut films by various directors, including Philipp Yankovsky (In Motion, 2002) and Fyodor Bondarchuk (The 9th Company, 2005); prize winners of international film festivals – Aleksei German-jr. (The Last Train, 2003) and Ilya Khrzhanovsky (4, 2004); and symbolic representatives of Russian artistic circle Konstantin Murzenko (April, 2001) and Renata Litvinova (The Goddess: How I Fell In Love, 2004).

In 2008 Sergei Dvortsevoy with Tulpan, an ethnic film about Kazakh nomads that received international awards including "Un Certain Regard Award" in Cannes and outstanding reviews.

== Awards ==
She won the Best Producer of the CIS and Baltic Countries award at the Open Film Festival Kinoshok in 2003. She is a two-time winner of the “Nika” Russian National Film Award as the Best Fiction Film Producer (Our Own, 2004 and The 9th Company, 2005) and the winner of the “Golden Eagle” National Film Award as the Best Fiction Film Producer of 2005 (9th Company).

== Films ==
- To Love Like Russians Do 2 (1996, directed by Yevgeny Matveyev)
- American Bet (1997, directed by Dmitry Meskhiev)
- Tests For Real Men (1998, directed by Andrey Razenkov)
- Women's Property (1999, directed by Dmitry Meskhiev)
- To Love Like Russians Do 3. The Governor (1999, directed by Yevgeny Matveyev)
- April (2001, directed by Konstantin Murzenko)
- The Sky. The Plane. The Girl. (2002, directed by Vera Storozheva)
- In Motion (2002, directed by Filipp Yankovsky)
- Black Ice (2002, directed by Mikhail Brashinskiy)
- Diary Of A Kamikaze (2002, directed by Dmitry Meskhiev
- The Last Train (2003, directed by Aleksei German jr.)
- Honey Baby (2004, directed by Mika Kaurismyaki)
- Our Own (2004, directed by Dmitry Meskhiev)
- Goddess. How I Fell In Love (2004, directed by Renata Litvinova)
- 4 (2004, directed by Ilya Khrzhanovskiy)
- The Wonderful Valley (2004, directed by Rano Kubayeva)
- Russian Dolls (2005, directed by Cédric Klapisch)
- 9th Company (2005, directed by Fyodor Bondarchuk)
- La Traductrice (2006, directed by Elena Khazanova)
- 9 months (2006, directed by Rezo Gigineishvili) 8-episodes TV-series
- Red Pearl Of Love (2008, directed by Andres Puustusmaa)
- Tulpan (2008, directed by Sergei Dvortsevoy)
- The Concert (2009, directed by Radu Mihăileanu)
- Cadences (2010, directed by Ivan Savelyev)
- Brothel Lights (2011, directed by Alexander Gordon)
- Dumpling Brothers (2013, directed by Gennadiy Ostrovskiy)
- Little Bird ('Ptichka') (2015, directed by Vladimir Beck)
- The Hit (2015, directed by Rita Mikhailova) – post-production
