= DAU. Natasha =

2020 film

- Film poster
- Directed by: Ilya Khrzhanovsky; Jekaterina Oertel
- Starring: Natalia Berezhnaya
- Production companies: Phenomen Ukraine; Phenomen Films; Phenomen Berlin Filmproduktions
- Release date: 26 February 2020 (Berlinale)
- Running time: 146 minutes
- Countries: Russia; Germany; Ukraine; United Kingdom
- Language: Russian

DAU. Natasha is a 2020 Russian-language internationally co-produced drama film directed by Ilya Khrzhanovsky and Jekaterina Oertel. It was selected to compete for the Golden Bear in the main competition section at the 70th Berlin International Film Festival. At Berlin, the film won the Silver Bear for Outstanding Artistic Contribution.

== Plot ==
The film tells the story of Natasha, the head of the cafeteria at a fictional secret research institute in the 1950s. During the day, she serves visitors, and in the evenings, she relaxes by drinking alcoholic beverages with her assistant, Olya. The two friends discuss their everyday problems, talk about love, and share their dreams with each other. Although they frequently argue and fight (Olya refuses to obey Natasha), they still spend most of their time together.

One evening at a party, Natasha grows closer to a French scientist, Luc Bijé, who has been invited to the event. They begin an affair, and eventually, they have sex. After their relationship becomes known to others, Natasha’s life takes a drastic turn. She is summoned for questioning by General Azhypo from the KGB, who physically and psychologically tortures her, forcing her to sign false confessions and documents of cooperation.

The film ends with an episode in which Natasha has a falling-out with Olya.

== Cast ==
- Natalia Berezhnaya as Natasha
- Olga Shkabarnya as Olga
- Vladimir Azhippo as Azhippo
- Alexei Blinov as Prof. Blinov
- Luc Bigé as Luc

== Production ==
The film took 15 years to produce and utilized hundreds of actors. The Guardian likened the film to a real world implementation of Synecdoche, New York. The filmmakers were accused of filming the unsimulated sex scene between Natalia Berezhnaya and Luc Bigé without the knowledge of the actors, but Berezhnaya denied that.

== Reception ==
DAU. Natasha has an approval rating of 85% on review aggregator website Rotten Tomatoes, based on 13 reviews, and an average rating of 8.8/10. On Metacritic, the film has a weighted average score of 75 out of 100, based on 5 critics, indicating "generally favorable reviews".

== See also ==
- DAU (project)
- Dau (film)
