= Vladimir Korepin =

Russian physicist and mathematician

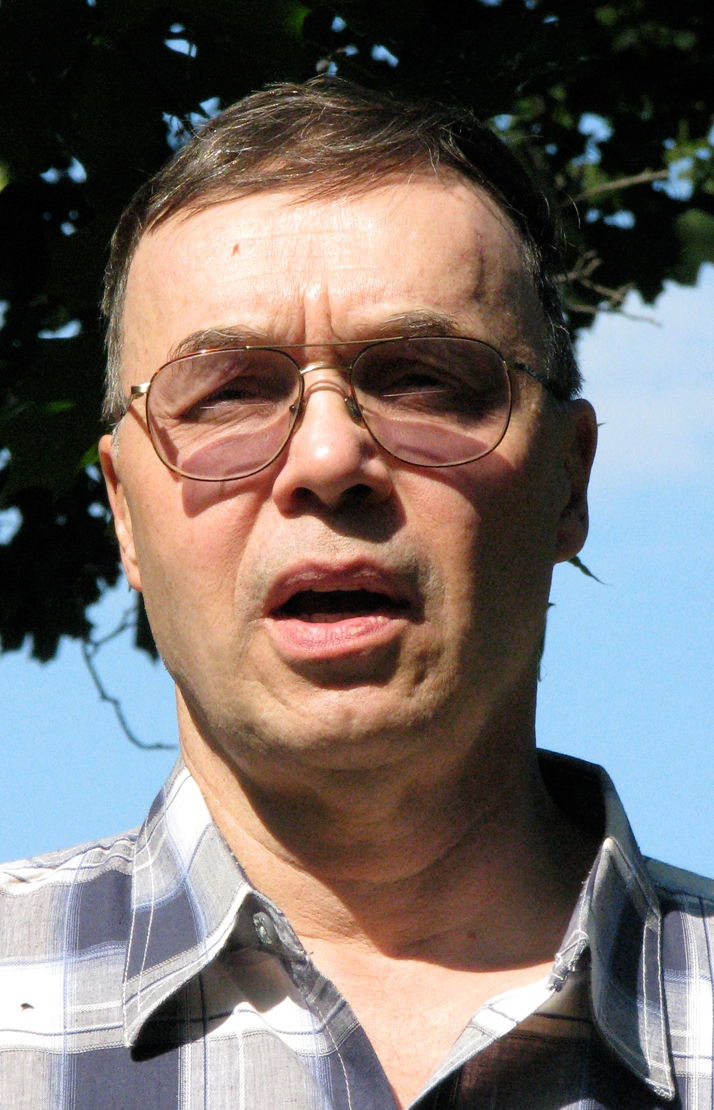
- Born: February 6, 1951 (age 75)
- Education: Saint Petersburg State University
- Known for: Izergin-Korepin model Quantum determinant Yang action
- Scientific career
- Fields: Theoretical Physics, Mathematics
- Workplaces: Stony Brook University
- Doctoral advisor: Ludwig Faddeev
- Notable students: Samson Shatashvilli; Fabian Essler; Vitaly Tarasov

Vladimir E. Korepin (born 1951) is a professor at the C. N. Yang Institute of Theoretical Physics of the Stony Brook University. Korepin made research contributions in several areas of mathematics and physics.

== Educational background ==
Korepin completed his undergraduate study at Saint Petersburg State University, graduating with a diploma in theoretical physics in 1974. In that same year he was employed by the Mathematical Institute of Academy of Sciences. He worked there until 1989, obtaining his PhD in 1977 under the supervision of Ludwig Faddeev. At the same institution he completed his postdoctoral studies. In 1985, he received a Doctor of Science degree in mathematical physics.

== Contributions to physics ==
Korepin has made contributions to several fields of theoretical physics. Although he is best known for his involvement in condensed matter physics and mathematical physics, he significantly contributed to quantum gravity as well. In recent years, his work has focused on aspects of condensed matter physics relevant for quantum information.

=== Condensed matter ===
Among his contributions to condensed matter physics, we mention his studies on low-dimensional quantum gases. In particular, the 1D Hubbard model of strongly correlated fermions, and the 1D Bose gas with delta potential interactions.

In 1979, Korepin presented a solution of the massive Thirring model in one space and one time dimension using the Bethe ansatz. In this work, he provided the exact calculation of the mass spectrum and the scattering matrix.

He studied solitons in the sine-Gordon model. He determined their mass and scattering matrix, both semiclassically and to one loop corrections.

Together with Anatoly Izergin, he discovered the 19-vertex model (sometimes called the Izergin-Korepin model).

In 1993, together with A. R. Its, Izergin and N. A. Slavnov, he calculated space, time and temperature dependent correlation functions in the XX spin chain. The exponential decay in space and time separation of the correlation functions was calculated explicitly.

=== Quantum gravity ===
In this field, Korepin has worked on the cancellation of ultra-violet infinities in one loop on mass shell gravity.

== Contributions to mathematics ==
In 1982, Korepin introduced domain wall boundary conditions for the six vertex model, published in Communications in Mathematical Physics. The result plays a role in diverse fields of mathematics such as algebraic combinatorics, alternating sign matrices, domino tiling, Young diagrams and plane partitions. In the same paper the determinant formula was proved for the square of the norm of the Bethe ansatz wave function. It can be represented as a determinant of linearized system of Bethe equations. It can also be represented as a matrix determinant of second derivatives of the Yang action.

The so-called "Quantum Determinant" was discovered in 1981 by A.G. Izergin and V.E. Korepin. It is the center of the Yang–Baxter algebra.

The study of differential equations for quantum correlation functions led to the discovery of a special class of Fredholm integral operators. Now they are referred to as completely integrable integral operators. They have multiple applications not only to quantum exactly solvable models, but also to random matrices and algebraic combinatorics.

== Contributions to quantum information and quantum computation ==
Vladimir Korepin has produced results in the evaluation of the entanglement entropy of different dynamical models, such as interacting spins, Bose gases, and the Hubbard model. He considered models with unique ground states, so that the entropy of the whole ground state is zero. The ground state is partitioned into two spatially separated parts: the block and the environment. He calculated the entropy of the block as a function of its size and other physical parameters. In a series of articles, Korepin was the first to compute the analytic formula for the entanglement entropy of the XX (isotropic) and XY Heisenberg models. He used Toeplitz Determinants and Fisher-Hartwig Formula for the calculation. In the Valence-Bond-Solid states (which is the ground state of the Affleck-Kennedy-Lieb-Tasaki model of interacting spins), Korepin evaluated the entanglement entropy and studied the reduced density matrix. He also worked on quantum search algorithms with Lov Grover. Many of his publications on entanglement and quantum algorithms can be found on ArXiv.

In May 2003, Korepin helped organize a conference on quantum and reversible computations in Stony Brook. Another conference was on November 15–18, 2010, entitled the Simons Conference on New Trends in Quantum Computation.

== Books ==
- Essler, F. H. L.; Frahm, H., Goehmann, F., Kluemper, A., & Korepin, V. E., The One-Dimensional Hubbard Model. Cambridge University Press (2005).
- V.E. Korepin, N.M. Bogoliubov and A.G. Izergin, Quantum Inverse Scattering Method and Correlation Functions, Cambridge University Press (1993).
- Exactly Solvable Models of Strongly Correlated Electrons. Reprint volume, eds. F.H.L. Essler and V.E. Korepin, World Scientific (1994).

== Honours ==
- Korepin's H-index is 68 with over 20431 citations.
- In 1996 Korepin was elected fellow of the American Physical Society.
- Fellow of the International Association of Mathematical Physics and the Institute of Physics.
- Editor of Reviews in Mathematical Physics, the International Journal of Modern Physics and Theoretical and Mathematical Physics.
- His 60-th birthday was celebrated by Institute of Advanced Studies in Singapore in 2011.
