= Samson Shatashvili =

Theoretical and mathematical physicist

Samson Lulievich Shatashvili
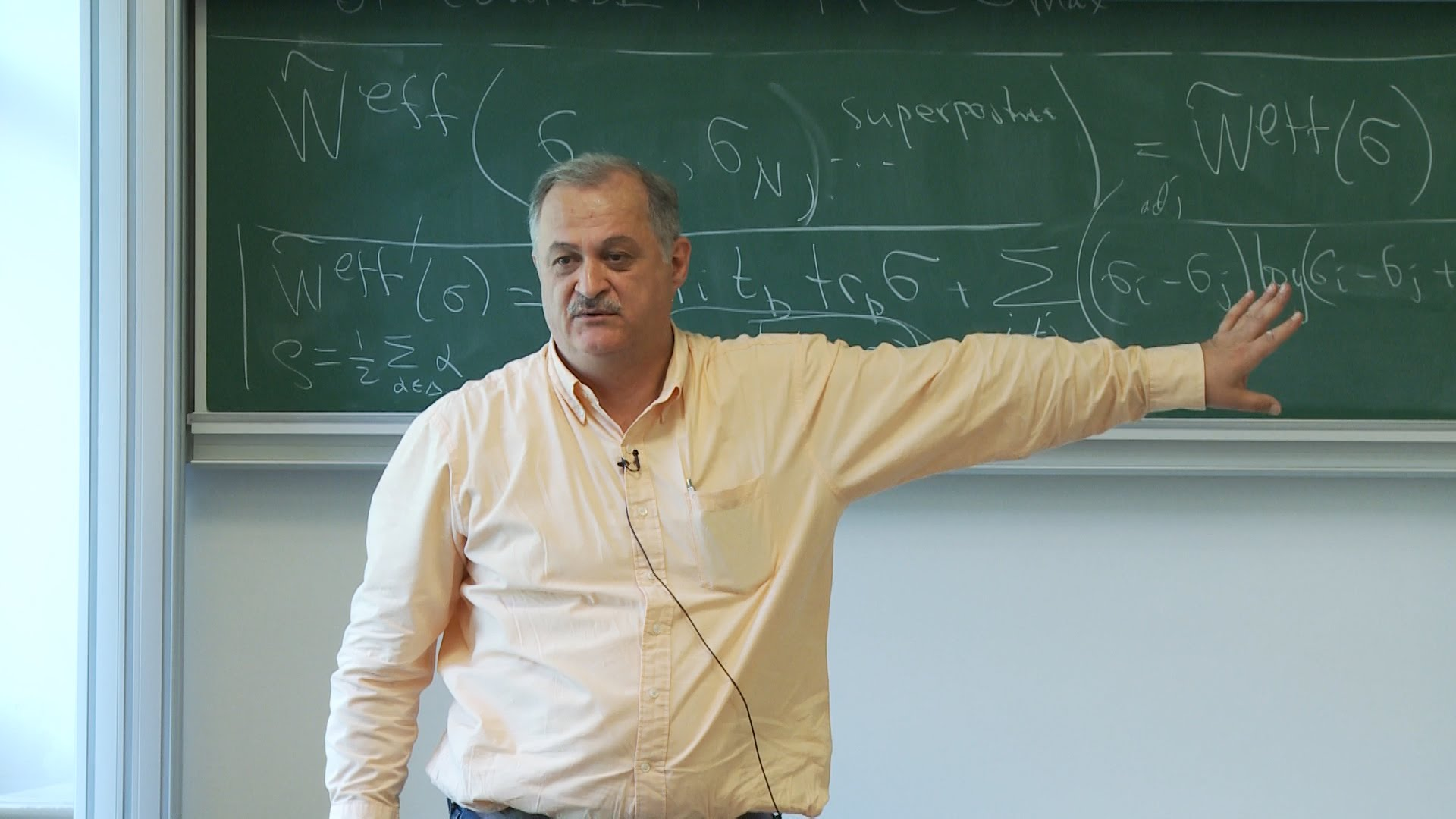
- Shatashvili at a seminar at the IHES
- Born: 7 February 1960 (age 66); Georgian SSR
- Education: Tbilisi State University (BS); Steklov Institute of Mathematics in Saint Petersburg (PhD)
- Known for: Gauge/Bethe correspondence
- Awards: Dannie Heineman Prize for Mathematical Physics (2025)
- Scientific career
- Fields: Physics, Mathematics
- Workplaces: Yale University, Trinity College Dublin, Hamilton Mathematics Institute, Institut des Hautes Études Scientifiques, Simons Center for Geometry and Physics
- Thesis: (1984)
- Doctoral advisor: Ludvig Faddeev, Vladimir Korepin
- Website: website

Samson Lulievich Shatashvili (Georgian: სამსონ შათაშვილი; Russian: Самсон Лулиевич Шаташвили, born February 1960) is a theoretical and mathematical physicist who has been working at Trinity College Dublin, Ireland, since 2002. He holds the Trinity College Dublin Chair of Natural Philosophy and is the director of the Hamilton Mathematics Institute. He is also affiliated with the Institut des Hautes Études Scientifiques (IHÉS), where he held the Louis Michel Chair from 2003 to 2013 and the Israel Gelfand Chair from 2014 to 2019. Shatashvili was a visiting faculty member at the Simons Center for Geometry and Physics (SCGP) from 2014 to 2024. Prior to moving to Trinity College, he was a professor of physics at Yale University from 1994.

== Background ==
Shatashvili received his PhD in 1984 at the Steklov Institute of Mathematics in Saint Petersburg under the supervision of Ludwig Faddeev (and Vladimir Korepin). The topic of his thesis was on gauge theories and had the title "Modern Problems in Gauge Theories". In 1989 he received D.S. degree (doctor of science, 2nd degree in Russia) also at the Steklov Institute of Mathematics in Saint Petersburg.

== Contributions and awards ==
Shatashvili has made several discoveries in the fields of theoretical and mathematical physics. He is mostly known for his work with Ludwig Faddeev on quantum anomalies, with Anton Alekseev on geometric methods in two-dimensional conformal field theories, for his work on background independent open string field theory, with Cumrun Vafa on superstrings and manifolds of exceptional holonomy, with Anton Gerasimov on tachyon condensation, with Andrei Losev, Nikita Nekrasov and Greg Moore on instantons and supersymmetric gauge theories, as well as for his work with Nikita Nekrasov on quantum integrable systems. In particular, Shatashvili and Nikita Nekrasov discovered the gauge/Bethe correspondence. In 1995 he received an Outstanding Junior Investigator Award of the Department of Energy (DOE) and a NSF Career Award and from 1996 to 2000 he was a Sloan Fellow. Shatashvili is a fellow of Trinity College Dublin, a member of the Royal Irish Academy and the recipient of the 2010 Royal Irish Academy Gold Medal as well as the Ivane Javakhishvili State Medal, Georgia. In 2009 he was a plenary speaker at the International Congress on Mathematical Physics in Prague and in 2014 was an invited speaker at the International Congress of Mathematicians in Seoul (speaking on "Gauge theory angle at quantum integrability"). In 2025, he won the Dannie Heineman Prize for Mathematical Physics for "clever use of various techniques in studying symmetry in quantum field theory".
