= Sergey Adonyev =

Russian businessman and philanthropist (born 1961)

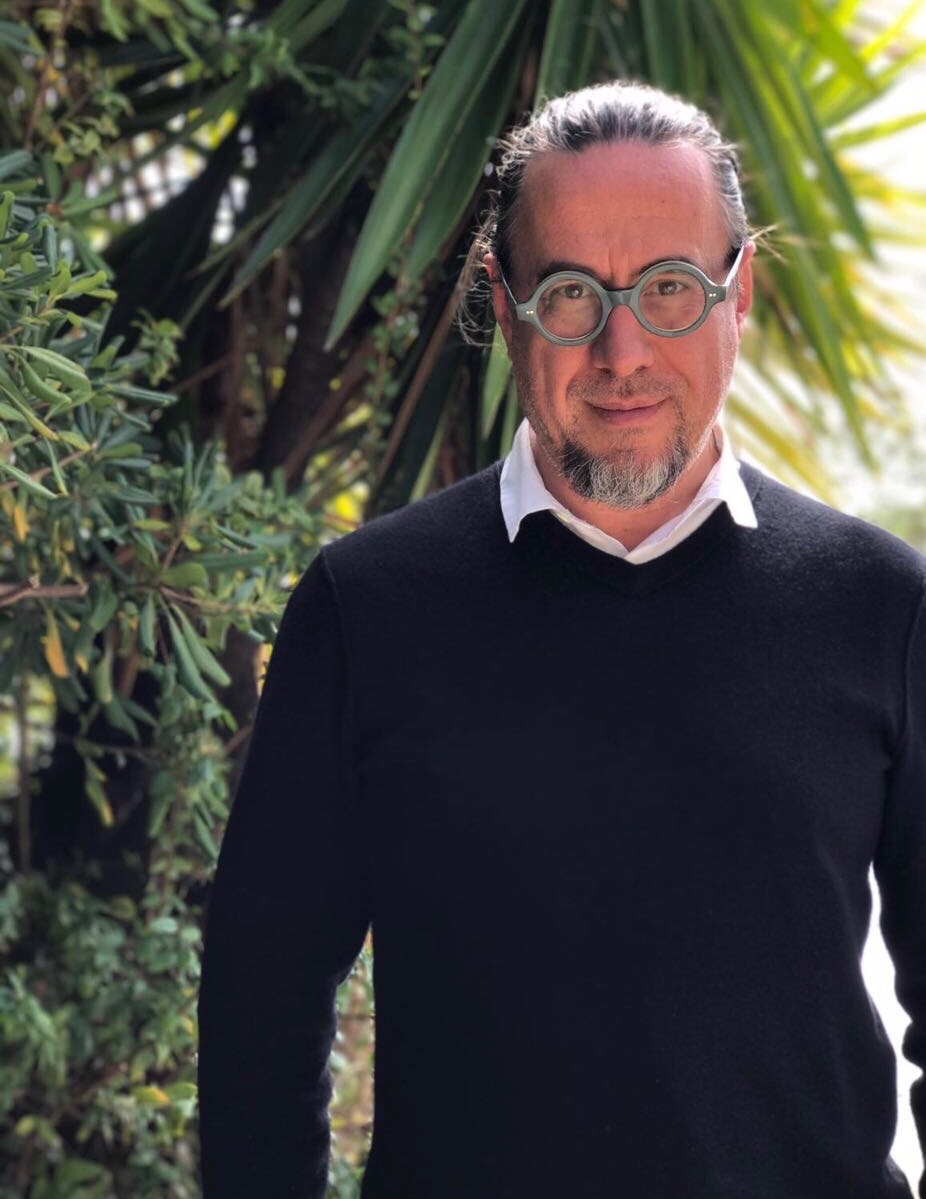
- Born: 28 January 1961 (age 65); Lviv, Ukrainian SSR, Soviet Union
- Occupations: Businessman, philanthropist

Sergey Adonyev (Russian: Серге́й Николаевич Адоньев; born 28 January 1961 in Lviv, Soviet Union) is a Russian businessman and philanthropist.

== Education ==
Adonyev graduated from Leningrad Polytechnic Institute, where he also taught Structural Resistance in 1985–1989.

== Early business activities ==
=== JFC ===
In 1994, together with Oleg Boyko and Vladimir Kekhman, Adonyev founded Olbi-Jazz, a fruit importing company. In 1996, Adonyev founded a new company, Joint Food Company (JFC), which became the leading fruit importing company in Russia. In 2001, Adonyev sold his shares in the company.

== Main business activities ==
=== Telecom ===
In 2006, Adonyev founded Telconet Capital fund, which became the main shareholder of the telecommunication operator Skartel – trademark Yota. Yota reached operational profit within the first five months and became the first provider launching mobile wimax (4G) in Russia. In 2008, 25% of the company was acquired by Rostec. In 2012, Yota was the first company in Russia to launch LTE. In 2011, Yota's division that developed high-technology mobile internet devices became Yota Devices, which developed the YotaPhone. Yota Devices subsequently separated from Yota. In 2013, Telconet Capital fund sold its shares in Skartel to Garsdale Services – a telecommunication holding, controlled by Alisher Usmanov. The estimated value of the transaction is US$1.33 billion.

=== Real estate and agro-business ===
In 2013, together with businessman Sergey Rukin, Adonyev established Technologies of Greenhouse Growth – a St Petersburg company. The company united two existing greenhouse plants in Moscow and Tumen regions, as well as a trading house, TTR Trade. It sold its products under the brand ‘ROST’ in the main retailers throughout Russia (including Metro, Paytyerochka, Diksi, Magnit, Lenta). More than US$100 million was invested into this project. At the beginning of 2017, Rukin bought out Adonyev's share in this business.

In 2017, Adonyev was ranked 124th in the Forbes list with a net worth of US$800 million. but according to him in an interview sold his food company for $6.2 billion taking 50% worth 3.1 billion obviously also adding on the telecommunications world with a now f1 company yota

== Fraud conviction ==
In 1998, Adonyev was convicted of defrauding the Kazakh government of $4 million through false sales of Cuban sugar, and sentenced to 30 months in jail. He was deported to Russia in 1999.

== Philanthropy ==
Adonyev supports many cultural and social projects, the most significant of which include the following:

=== Arts ===
==== Stanislavsky Electrotheatre ====
Stanislavsky Electrotheatre opened in 2015 after a full reconstruction and artistic restructuring under the supervision of the theatre director, theoretician, and educator – Boris Yukhananov. Romeo Castellucci, Heiner Goebels, Konstantin Bogomolov, Philipp Grigoryan, Katy Mitchell, Teodor Currentzis, Theodoros Terzopoulos, Dmitri Kurlyandksiy – are among the artists who have collaborated with the theatre.

==== MusicAeterna choir ====
The choir is under the supervision of renowned conductor, Teodor Currentzis. MusicAeterna was the first Russian orchestra opening the Salzburg Festival.

==== DAU ====
DAU is a large scale international film project by Ilya Khrzhanovsky. It is a significant collaboration between Russia and Europe, supported by international film funds and production companies (Medienboard Berlin-Brandenburg, Mitteldeutsche Medienförderung, Arte France Cinema, WDR/Arte Essential Filmproduktion, Eurimage, The Swedish Film Institute, and others). Teodor Currentzis, Marina Abramovich, Carsten Hoeller, Romeo Castellucci, Vladimir Martynov, Leonid Fedorov, Boris Mikhailov, Robert Del Naja, Brian Eno, Anatoliy Vassiliev, Nobel Prize winner David Gross, Fields Medal winner Shing-Tung Yau – are among the artists and scientists who participated in the DAU project. The premiere is planned for the fall of 2018.

=== Education ===
==== Strelka Institute for Media, Architecture and Design ====
Strelka Institute is a non-profit international educational project, founded in 2009 and located in Moscow. Adonyev co-founded the Strelka Institute with Alexander Mamut, and co-financed it between 2009 and 2014.

==== Merab Mamardashvili Foundation ====
The Foundation is aimed at studying and publishing the heritage of the outstanding Soviet philosopher and phenomenologist, Merab Mamardashvili.

==== Salomon Maimon Heritage Foundation ====
The Foundation is aimed at studying and publishing the life and works of Salomon Maimon, a Lithuanian-German self-taught philosopher of Jewish descent from the 17th century.

=== Charity ===
==== Charitable Foundation Ostrova ====
The charity offers help to people suffering from cystic fibrosis in Russia.

In 2016, Adonyev received Philanthropist of the Year award. The award was established by the Ministry of Culture of Russia and is awarded to significant philanthropists for their support and financial aid to projects aimed at preservation of Russian cultural heritage.
