= Sonia Contera =

Spanish physicist

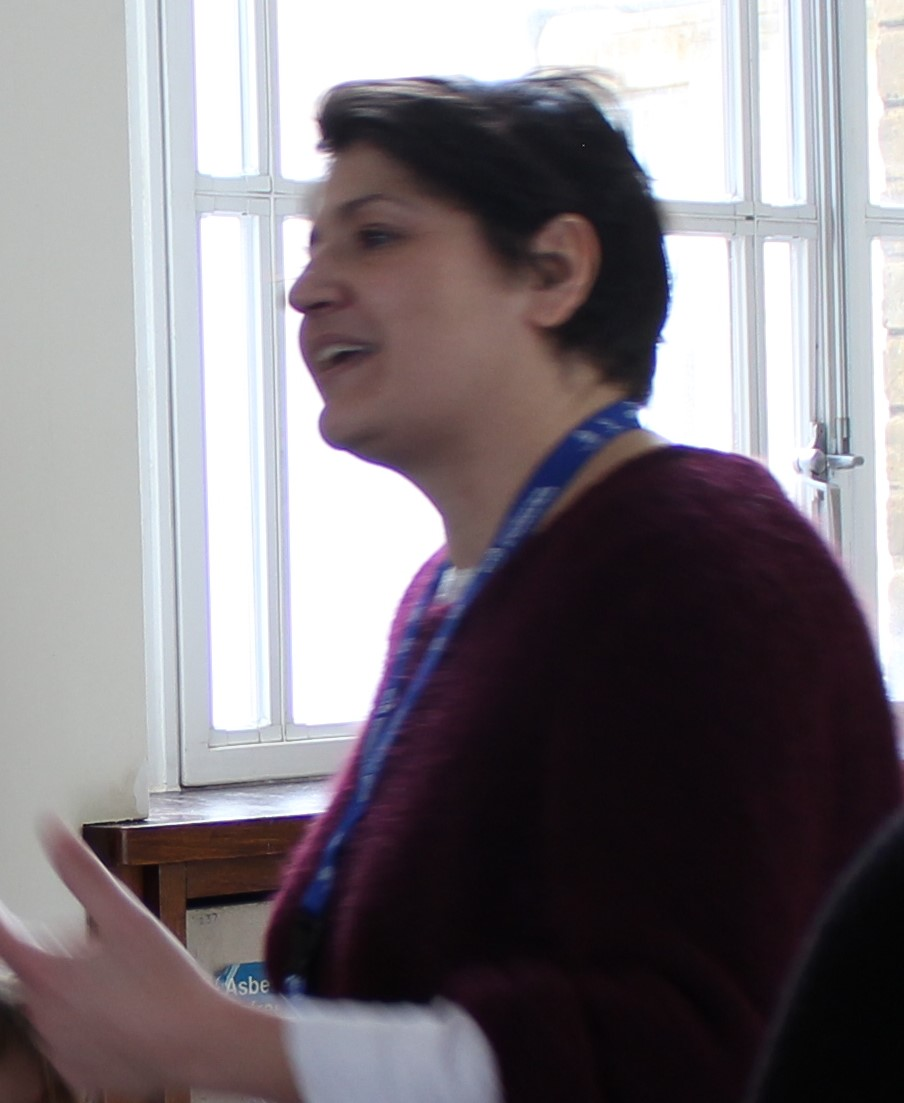
- Contera speaking in 2019
- Born: 1970 (age 55–56); Madrid
- Education: Autonomous University of Madrid; Osaka University
- Occupation: Physicist
- Employer: University of Oxford
- Title: Professor of Biological Physics

Sonia Antoranz Contera (born 1970) is a Spanish physicist. She serves as Professor of Biological Physics at the University of Oxford, a senior fellow at the Oxford Martin School, and a senior research fellow at Green Templeton College.

== Early life and education ==
Sonia Antoranz Contera, born 1970, is from Madrid, Spain. She studied for her Licenciatura in physics at the Autonomous University of Madrid. She went on to study in Moscow, Prague and Beijing. She received her PhD from Osaka University in 2000, where her supervisor was Hiroshi Iwasaki.

Having traveled extensively during her education, Contera speaks Spanish, English, Chinese, Czech, Russian, Danish, Japanese, German and French.

== Research and career ==
Contera's research uses physics and nanotechnology to understand biological problems. She has a special interest in the role of mechanics in biology and designs nanomaterials that mimic biological functions for biomedical applications such as drug delivery and tissue engineering. In 2003, she began working at Oxford. Contera was Co-Director of the Oxford Martin Programme on Nanotechnology for Medicine from 2008 to 2013. In 2014–2016, she was a Member of the World Economic Forum Global Agenda Council on Nanotechnology. In 2017, Contera was appointed Chair of the Scanning Probe Microscopy Section of the Royal Microscopical Society.

Contera's book Nano Comes to Life: How Nanotechnology is transforming medicine and the future of Biology (Princeton University Press) was published December 2019. The book was reviewed by Nature, Nature Physics, the New Scientist, BBC Science Focus and was featured in BBC Radio 4 "Start of the Week". It was published in paperback in 2022, in Chinese by CITIC press and in Japanese by Newton Press.

Contera is also a public speaker on the medical, philosophical and social consequences of the science emerging at the interface of nanotechnology, physics and biology; she has spoken in forums such as the Royal Institution of Great Britain She also writes on communication and the mission of science.
