= The Kiev Trial =

2022 documentary film

- Directed by: Sergei Loznitsa
- Written by: Sergei Loznitsa
- Produced by: Maria Baker-Choustova; Sergey Loznitsa
- Edited by: Sergei Loznitsa; Tomasz Wolski; Danielius Kokanauskis
- Release date: 5 September 2022 (Venice)
- Running time: 106 minutes
- Countries: Ukraine; Netherlands
- Languages: Russian; German; Ukrainian

The Kiev Trial (Ukrainian: Київський процес, romanized: Kyyivsʹkyy protses, Russian: Киевский процесс, romanized: Kiyevskiy protsess) is a 2022 documentary film written and directed by Sergei Loznitsa. A co-production between Ukraine and Netherlands, it had its world premiere at the 79th edition of the Venice Film Festival.

== Overview ==
The film documents through unseen archive footage the trial held in Kyiv in 1946 against German Nazis who had committed atrocities in Ukraine.

== Production ==
Loznitsa spent several years developing the film project. The film was produced by Atoms & Void and the Babyn Yar Holocaust Memorial Center.

== Release ==
The film premiered out of competition at the 79th Venice International Film Festival.

== Reception ==
Lee Marshall from Screen International described Loznitsa's film as "an absorbing, timely work, which touches on a question that is fresh in the minds of many of his countrymen today: how best to bear witness to crimes of war, and how to separate revenge from retribution". Similarly, Susanne Gottlieb from Cineuropa noted how Loznitsa "shows how easily justice can be turned into spectacular revenge – a debate that modern-day Ukraine will have to face sooner or later as well, given the geopolitical circumstances".

Jonathan Romney from Sight and Sound compared the film to Loznitsa's 2018 similarly themed documentary The Trial: both films about "how justice works in the context of the Stalin-era legal system", "that earlier film was about the state imposition of lies; this one is about the attempt, within the same official apparatus, of revealing and establishing truth".

The Playlist's film critic Christian Gallichio wrote: "While Loznita has crafted a compelling document of historical significance, the act of watching the film is a bit scattered. The choice to use only archival footage is commendable and creates an immediacy to the experience, but the lack of any historical context [...] creates a hermetic viewing experiencing, siloing the proceedings away from any sense of a timeline of how and when these events took place".
