= Alexander Etkind =

Russian historian and cultural scientist

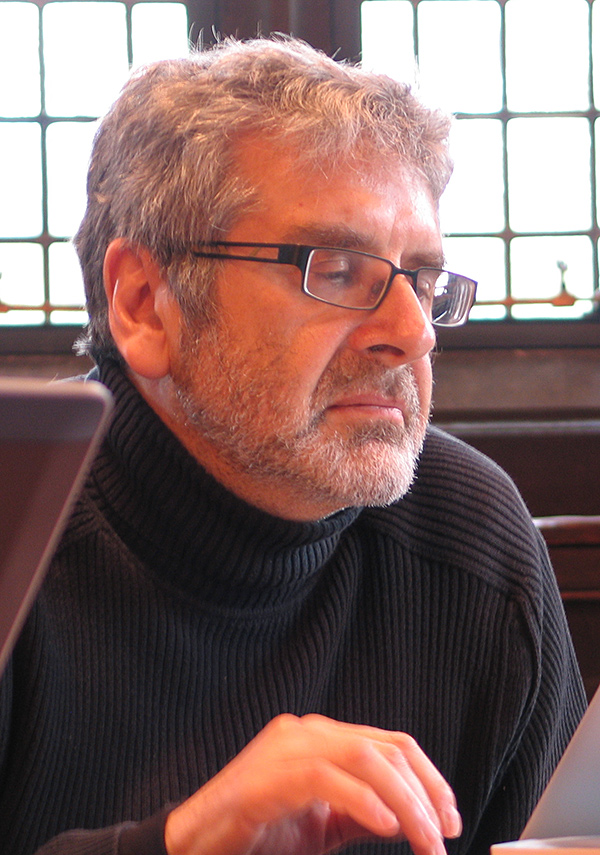
Alexander Etkind

Alexander Etkind (born 1955, St. Petersburg, Russia) is a historian and cultural scientist. Currently he is employed as a professor in the Department of International Relations at the Central European University. He is fellow of the European Institute for International Law and International Relations.

== Career ==
He completed his B.A. and M.A. in 1978 in Psychology and English at Leningrad State University. In 1998, he defended PhD (Habilitation) in Slavonic Studies/ Cultural History at the University of Helsinki. Etkind taught at the European University at St. Petersburg then at Cambridge University where he was also a fellow of King's College. He was a visiting fellow at New York University, Wissenschaftskolleg in Berlin, and other places.

Etkind's research focuses on European and Russian intellectual history, memory studies, natural resources and the history of political economy, empire and colonies in Europe, and Russian politics, novels and film in the 21st century.

Nature's Evil: A Cultural History of Natural Resources is a world history (with special emphasis on Russia) of the economic and political roles of grain, meat, fur, sugar, hemp, metals, peat, coal and oil.

From 2010 to 2013, he led the international research project “Memory at War: Cultural Dynamics in Poland, Russia, and Ukraine”. The project studied the role of cultural memory of the Soviet era in Russia, Ukraine and Poland and received funding from Humanities in the European Research Area (HERA).

Etkind has publications in Russian and English, and speaks both languages.

== Selected publications ==
- Russia Against Modernity. Cambridge: Polity Press, 2023.
- "Alexey Navalny: A hero of the new time." New Perspectives (2022): 2336825X211065909.
- Rethinking the Gulag: Identities, Sources, Legacies Indiana University Press, 2022, editor, with Irina Anatolievna Flige, Susan Grunewald, Jeffrey S. Hardy, Mikhail Nakonechnyi, Judith Pallot, Gavin Slade, Lynne Viola, Josephine von Zitzewitz, and Sarah J. Young.
- Nature's Evil: A Cultural History of Natural Resources Polity Press, 2021. excerpt; see online review
- Eros of the impossible: The history of psychoanalysis in Russia. Routledge, 2019, with Maria Rubins. online review
- "Petromacho, or Mechanisms of de-modernization in a resource state." Russian politics & law 56.1-2 (2018): 72–85. online
- "Kant’s Subaltern Period: The Birth of Cosmopolitanism from the Spirit of Occupation." in Cosmopolitanism in Conflict (Palgrave Macmillan, London, 2018) pp. 55–83.
- Roads not Taken. An Intellectual Biography of William C. Bullitt. Pittsburgh University Press 2017. online review
- Cultural Forms of Protest in Russia, co-ed. with B. Beumers, O. Gurova and S. Turoma. New York: Routledge, 2017.
- “How Russia Colonized Itself. Internal Colonization in Classical Russian Historiography”, International Journal for History, Culture, and Modernity, Vol 3, No. 2, 2015, pp. 159–172.
- “Post-Soviet Russia: The Land of the Oil Curse, Pussy Riot, and Magical Historicism” Boundary 2, Vol 41, No. 1, 2014, pp. 153–170.
- Memory and Theory in Eastern Europe, co-ed. with U. Blacker and J. Fedor, New York: Palgrave Macmillan, 2013.
- Warped Mourning. Stories of the Undead in the Land of the Unburied, Palo Alto: Stanford University Press, 2013.
- Remembering Katyn. Cambridge: Polity 2012, co-authored.
- Internal Colonization. Russia’s Imperial Experience, Cambridge: Polity 2011.
- “A Parable of Misrecognition: Anagnorisis and the Return of the Repressed from the Gulag,” Russian Review 68 (October 2009): 623–640.
- “Stories of the Undead in the Land of the Unburied: Magical Historicism in Contemporary Russian Fiction” Slavic Review 68, no. 3, Fall 2009, pp. 631–658.
- Хлыст: Секты, литература и революция (The Russian Flagellant: Sects, Literature, and Revolution) Moscow: NLO 1998; second revised edition: 2013.
- Eros of the Impossible: The History of Psychoanalysis in Russia. Boulder - Oxford: Westview 1996.
