= Alexei Blinov =

Soviet-born British electrical engineer (1965–2019)

- Born: July 10, 1965; Kazan, Soviet Union
- Died: November 26, 2019 (aged 54); London, United Kingdom
- Website: raylab.com

Alexei Blinov (10 July 1965–26 November 2019) was a London-based electronic engineer and new media artist working out of Raylab in Hackney. As founder of experimental new media organisation "Raylab" he has collaborated with a number of creative artists including Jamie Reid.

He was trained as a doctor before moving to the Netherlands and then the UK. In the early 1990s he specialised in large scale high quality laser projections. Starting in the late 1990s he produced a wide variety of interactive audiovisual installations.

Between 1993 and 1996 he worked extensively in the Netherlands, creating laser projections for scientific events, music and arts festivals and for dance companies. After 1997 he worked mainly in the UK, creating interactive audiovisual installations at a number of important art galleries.

From 2006-2016 he led the technical development for feature film Dau – life and times of physicist Lev Landau, on set in the Ukrainian border city Kharkov where he revisited many period experiments and engineered his own to feature in the film. The movie is one of Russia's largest and most controversial cinematic projects at the time.

Alongside Ilze Black and Martin Howse, he was a member of TAKE2030, a new media society that operated in parallel net media scheme. The London based collective produced public art projects, shifting social network missions into hypermedia playing fields. Past projects include RichAir2030, UK, EU (2003-2004) and Lets do Lunch, London (2005).

He died on 26 November 2019 following complications from pancreatic cancer.
