= James H. Fallon =

American neuroscientist (1947–2023)

- Born: October 18, 1947
- Died: November 20, 2023 (aged 76)
- Occupations: Neuroscientist, Professor at University of California, Irvine School of Medicine

James H. Fallon (October 18, 1947 – November 20, 2023) was an American neuroscientist. He was professor of psychiatry and human behavior and emeritus professor of anatomy and neurobiology in the University of California, Irvine School of Medicine. His research interests included adult stem cells, chemical neuroanatomy and circuitry, higher brain functions, and brain imaging.

Fallon, who stated that he had the neurological and genetic correlates of psychopathy, categorized himself as a "pro-social psychopath". In October 2013 his book, The Psychopath Inside: A Neuroscientist's Personal Journey into the Dark Side of the Brain, was released by Current (acquired by Penguin).

== Life ==
James H. Fallon was born to an Italian American family as one of six children. He also had English and Irish ancestry through New York colonial settler Thomas Cornell, who was convicted of murdering his mother and hanged in 1667. Fallon mentioned the many murders that occurred in the Cornell family line he shared with Lizzie Borden and discussed his and his family's genetics in a National Public Radio broadcast.

Fallon and his wife, Diane, had two daughters, Shannon and Tara, and one son, James. He had five grandchildren and a great-grandson.

Fallon died on November 20, 2023, at the age of 76.

== Academics ==
Fallon received his biology and chemistry undergraduate training at Saint Michael's College in Vermont and his psychology and psychophysics degree at Rensselaer Polytechnic Institute in New York. He carried out his Ph.D. training in neuroanatomy and neurophysiology at the University of Illinois College of Medicine, and his postdoctoral training in chemical neuroanatomy at UC San Diego. He was Professor of Anatomy and Neurobiology at UC Irvine, where he served as chairman of the university faculty and chair and President of the School of Medicine faculty.

Fallon was a Sloan Scholar, Senior Fulbright Fellow, National Institutes of Health Career Awardee, and a recipient of a range of honorary degrees and awards. He sat on several corporate boards and national think tanks for science, biotechnology, the arts, and the US military.

Fallon was a Subject Matter Expert in the field of "cognition and war" to the Pentagon.

Fallon made significant scientific contributions to several neuroscientific subjects, including the discoveries of TGF alpha and epidermal growth factor. He was the first to show large-scale stimulation of adult stem cells in the injured brain using growth factors. He also made contributions in the fields of schizophrenia, Parkinson's disease, Alzheimer's disease, and the roles of hostility and gender in nicotine and cocaine addiction. He was cited for his research in the basic biology of dopamine, norepinephrine, opioid peptides in the brain, connections of the cortex, limbic system, and basal ganglia in animals and humans. He published in human brain imaging using positron emission tomography, magnetic resonance imaging, diffusion tensor imaging tractography techniques, and the new field of imaging genetics.

== Other work ==
In addition to his neuroscience research, James Fallon lectured and wrote on topics ranging from art and the brain, architecture and the brain, law and the brain, consciousness, creativity, the brain of the psychopathic murderer, and the Vietnam War. He wrote Virga Tears: The True Story of a Soldier's Sojourn Back to Vietnam, which was published by Dickens Press in 2001.

Fallon appeared on numerous documentaries, radio, and TV shows. From 2007 to 2009, he appeared on the History Channel series on science and technology (Star Wars Tech, Spider-Man Tech), CNN, PBS, BBC, and ABC for his work on stem cells, growth factors, psychopathology, tissue engineering, smart prostheses, schizophrenia, and human and animal behavior and disease.

On November 18, 2009, Fallon appeared as himself on the CBS crime drama series Criminal Minds, which explores his theory of trans-generational violence in areas of the world that experience continuous bouts of terrorism, war, and violence.

Both Fallon and his family underwent functional brain imaging and genetic analyses for potential violence-related brain and genetic patterns.

Fallon was featured in the BBC production Are You Good or Evil?, where he revealed his discovery that he, himself, has the neurological and genetic correlates of psychopathy. Fallon stated that even though he displayed callous behaviour in his life, particularly when he was younger, he believed that his positive experiences in childhood negated any potential genetic vulnerabilities to violence and emotional issues.

Fallon was politically a libertarian, and religiously an agnostic.
