= Anatoly Vasiliev (theatre director) =

Russian theatre director (born 1942)

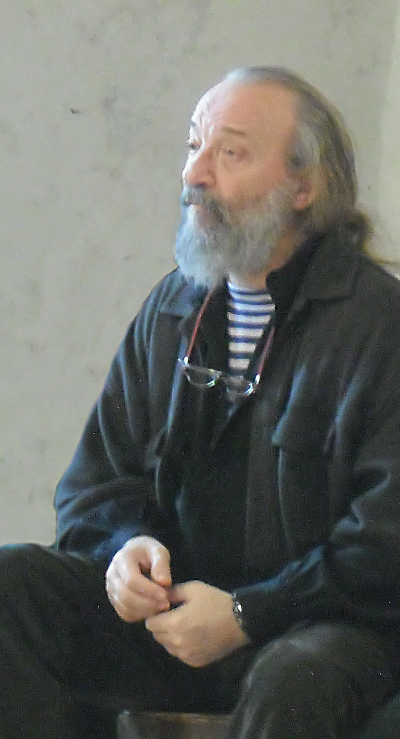
Anatoly Vasiliev

Anatoly Alexandrovitch Vasiliev (Russian: Анато́лий Алекса́ндрович Васи́льев; born May 4, 1942, Penza Oblast) is a Russian theatre director. He is artistic director of the Moscow Theatre "School of Dramatic Arts", Théâtre de l'Europe, and professor of drama in Lyon, France.

== Early years ==
Vasiliev was born in the Soviet Union and graduated from the faculty of chemistry at Rostov State University. In 1973, he received a degree in directing from the State Institute of Dramatic Art (GITIS), where he first worked with painter and scenographer Igor Popov. This collaboration continued throughout most of Vasiliev's professional life.

As director-Intern for the institute, he staged A Solo for a Clock with Chimes, which first brought him to the attention of Moscow theatre-goers. Subsequent productions of The First Draught of Vassa Zheleznova, in 1978, and The Grown Daughter of a Young Man, in 1979, were both staged at the Stanislavski Theatre).

== Taganka Theatre and School of Dramatic Arts ==
Vasiliev and the group of actors that had gathered around him left the Stanislavski theatre in 1982. In 1985, Yuri Petrovich Lyubimov invited him to work at the Taganka Theatre. The result was that Vasiliev directed a production of Cerceau, by Victor Slavkin, which was voted best performance for the 1985–1986 Moscow theatre season.

In 1987, Vasiliev founded the theatre School of Dramatic Art bringing with him many of the actors who had worked with him at the Stanislavski Theatre. The theatre's website sums up Vasiliev's vision for the theatre as follows: "The theatre 'School of Dramatic Art' created by Anatoly Vasiliev is a unique model of theatre from the point of view of its artistic, intellectual, professional and ethic relations. The concept of the 'theatre – laboratory' gives the opportunity to make the research and experiment."

Since its formation, Vasiliev has taken the theatre company on frequent tours, traveling internationally. Berlin, Belgrade, Brussels, Budapest, Helsinki, London, Munich, Paris, Rome, Rotterdam, and Stuttgart are among the cities they have visited.

== Later years ==
In 2010, Vasiliev started a three-year course for the training of theatre pedagogists. The course is based in Venice, takes place during two months each year and is mainly for Italian professionals, but also combines pedagogists, actors and directors from around the world. In mid-2011 Vasiliev began a Research seminary on acting techniques at the Grotowski Institute in Wrocław, Poland. The seminary lasted two years and combined graduates of the Venice program and actors from various European countries.

In 2016, Vasiliev will return to direct, for the first time in seven years, the play La Musica deuxième by French playwright Marguerite Duras, at the Comédie-Française in Paris. He is aided by his long time collaborator Natacha Isaeva, researcher of theatre and translator, and Boaz Trinker, actor-training specialist graduated from the Venice program.

== Recognition ==
Vasiliev was awarded the Laureate of Russian Stanislavsky Premium in 1988. He received the Order of the Cavalier of Art and Literature from France in 1989. He was awarded the Europe Prize Theatrical Realities in Taormina, Italy, in 1990, for his work with the Moscow School of Dramatic Art. He received the Chaos and Pirandello prizes in Agrigento, Italy, in 1992. In 1993, he received the Honoured Art Worker of Russia award, followed in 1995 by the Laureate of the Premium of Stanislasky Fund award for contributions in developing theatre pedagogics.

With Igor Popov, he received the 1999 State Premium of Russia award in the field of Literature and Art for the creation of Moscow theatre School of Dramatic Art, and the 2001 National Premium "Triumph" award.

In December 2012, he was awarded the prestigious Italian UBU award, for his three-year Island of Pedagogy project (2010–2012) in Venice.

In March 2016 Vasiliev was selected by UNESCO's International Theatre Institute (ITI) to address the world on World Theatre Day.
