= Nikita Nekrasov =

Russian mathematical and theoretical physicist

- Born: 10 April 1973 (age 53); Moscow, Soviet Union
- Education: Moscow State School 57; Moscow Institute of Physics and Technology; Institute for Theoretical and Experimental Physics; Princeton University
- Scientific career
- Fields: Physics, Mathematics
- Workplaces: Institut des Hautes Études Scientifiques; Institute for Theoretical and Experimental Physics; Institute for Information Transmission Problems; Harvard University; Princeton University; Stony Brook University; Simons Center for Geometry and Physics

Nikita Alexandrovich Nekrasov (Russian: Ники́та Алекса́ндрович Некра́сов; born 10 April 1973) is a Russian mathematical and theoretical physicist at the Simons Center for Geometry and Physics and C.N.Yang Institute for Theoretical Physics at Stony Brook University in New York, and a professor of the Russian Academy of Sciences.

== Career ==
Nekrasov studied at the Moscow State 57th School in 1986–1989. He graduated with honors from the Moscow Institute of Physics and Technology in 1995. In parallel, in 1994–1996 Nekrasov did his graduate work at Princeton University, under the supervision of David Gross. His Ph.D. thesis on Four Dimensional Holomorphic Theories was defended in 1996. There he introduced a four dimensional variant of Chern-Simons theory, rediscovered and developed by Kevin Costello in 2013.

He joined Harvard Society of Fellows at Harvard University as a Junior Fellow 1996–1999. He was then a Robert. H. Dicke Fellow at Princeton University from 1999 to 2000. In 2000-2013 he was a permanent professor at the Institut des Hautes Études Scientifiques. Since 2013, he is a full professor at the Simons Center for Geometry and Physics and C. N. Yang Institute for Theoretical Physics at Stony Brook University in New York.

== Research ==
Nekrasov is mostly known for his work on supersymmetric gauge theory, quantum integrability, and string theory. The Nekrasov partition function, which he introduced in his 2002 paper, relates in an intricate way the instantons in gauge theory, integrable systems, and representation theory of infinite-dimensional algebras.

== Honours and awards ==
For his discovery of noncommutative instantons together with Albert Schwarz in 1998, noncommutative monopoles and monopole strings with David Gross in 2000 and for his work with Alexander S. Gorsky on the relations between gauge theories and many-body systems he was awarded the Grand Prix Jacques Herbrand of the French Academy of Sciences in 2004. For his contributions to topological string theory and the ADHM construction he received the Hermann Weyl Prize in 2004. In 2008 together with Davesh Maulik, Andrei Okounkov and Rahul Pandharipande he formulated a set of conjectures relating Gromov–Witten theory and Donaldson–Thomas theory, for which the four authors were awarded the Compositio Prize in 2009.

Nekrasov was awarded the 2023 Dannie Heineman Prize for Mathematical Physics by the American Institute of Physics (AIP) and the American Physical Society (APS). for his “elegant application of powerful mathematical techniques to extract exact results for quantum field theories, as well as shedding light on integrable systems and non-commutative geometry.”

In 2024, Uppsala University of Sweden, awarded Nekrasov with an honorary doctorate.
