= Angst (surname) =

Angst is the surname of:

- Fritz Angst (1944–1976), German-language Swiss author better known as Fritz Zorn
- Heinrich Angst (1915–1989), Swiss bobsledder
- Jules Angst (1926–2026), Swiss psychiatrist and academic
- Max Angst (1921–2002), Swiss bobsledder
- Randy Angst, American politician, member of the Missouri House of Representatives from 2003 to 2004
- Richard Angst (1905–1984), Swiss cinematographer

== See also ==
- József Angster (1834–1918), Hungarian organ making master and founder of the Angster dynasty
- Judit Angster, great-granddaughter of József, physicist of organ acoustics
