= Angst (disambiguation) =

Angst is an intense feeling of internal emotional strife.

Angst may also refer to:

== Films ==
- Angst (1928 film), a British-German film
- Fear (1954 film), a Roberto Rossellini film based on the Zweig novella, known as Angst or Fear in English
- Angst (1976 film), a Norwegian film
- Angst (1983 film), an Austrian film
- Angst (2000 film), an Australian film
- Angst (2003 film), a German film

== Music ==
- Angst (band), an American punk rock band
- Angst (KMFDM album), 1993 album by KMFDM
- Angst (Lacrimosa album), 1991 album by Lacrimosa
- Angst, självdestruktivitetens emissarie, a 2002 album by Shining
- Angst (soundtrack), a 1984 Klaus Schulze album and soundtrack of 1983 film
- "Angst" (Loredana song), 2020
- "Angst" (Rammstein song), 2022

== In print ==
- Fear (Zweig novella), a 1925 Austrian novella with the original title Angst
- Angst (novel), by Oleg Postnov

== Other uses ==
- Angst (surname), a list of people
- angst!, an American artist in the hyperpop genre
