= Evgenia Berkovich =

Russian theater director

- Евгения Беркович
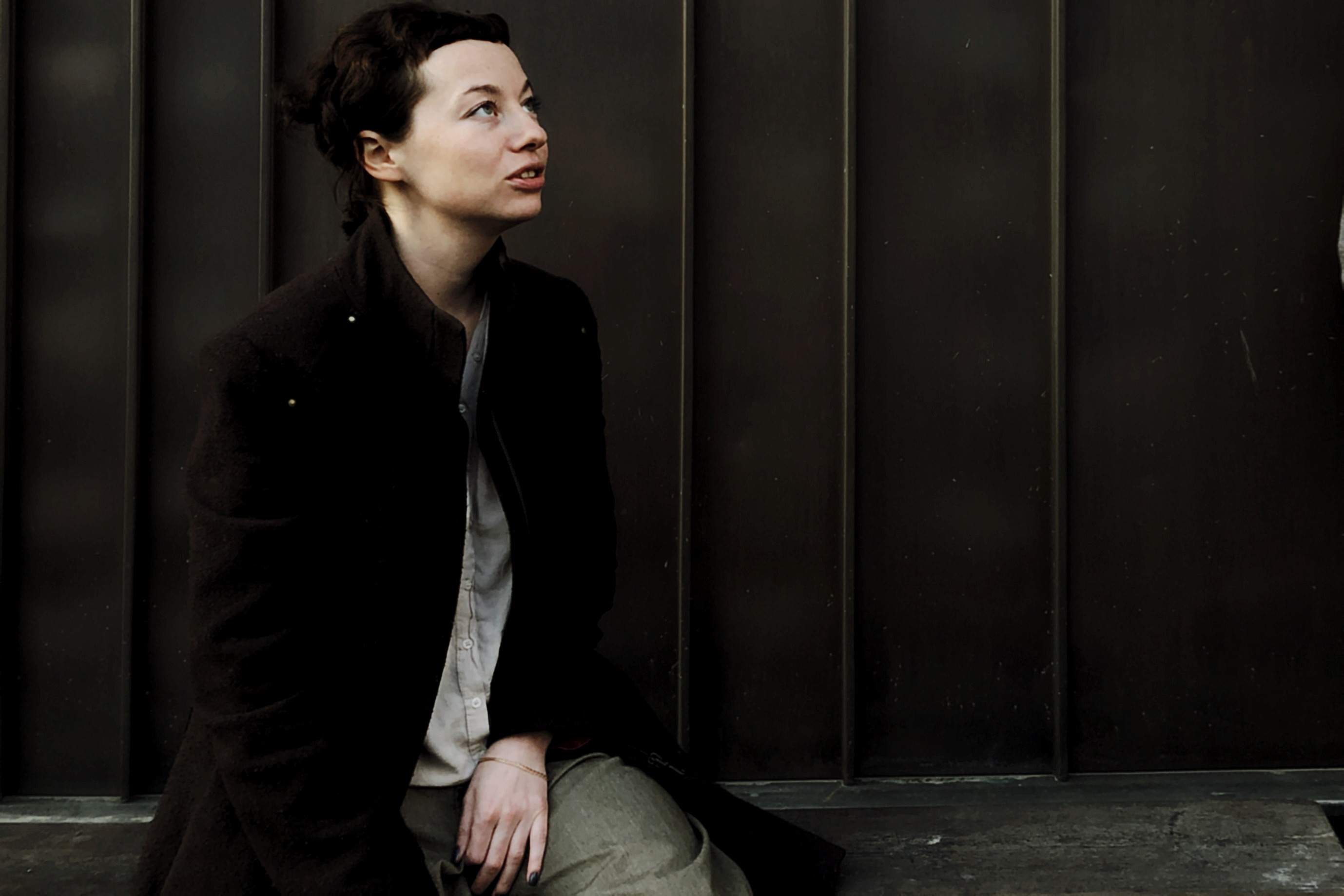
- Berkovich in 2019
- Born: April 29, 1985 (age 41); Leningrad, Russian SFSR, Soviet Union
- Education: Russian State Institute of Performing Arts, Moscow Art Theatre School

Evgenia Borisovna "Zhenya" Berkovich (Russian: Евгения Борисовна "Женя" Беркович; born 29 April 1985) is a Russian theatre director, playwright, and poet. She is a member of Kirill Serebrennikov's ‘Seventh Studio’.

On 5 May 2023, she was arrested alongside Svetlana Petriychuk on allegations of justifying terrorism. On 8 July 2024, the two were sentenced to six years in prison.

== Biography ==
=== Family ===
Berkovich is Jewish. Her paternal great-grandfather, Lev Maizelis, was accused of conspiracy and executed in 1938. Her maternal grandmother was Nina Katerli (1934-2023), a writer, publicist and human rights activist. Her grandfather wanted to be a director, but due to antisemitism in the USSR, was not accepted into any drama school. From him, Berkovich gained her love of theater. Berkovich's parents are Elena Mikhailovna Efros, a human rights activist, and Boris Berkovich, a poet. Her parents divorced when she was a child, and her father immigrated to Israel and remarried. She has one sister, Maria.

Berkovich is married to Nikolay Matveyev, also a theater professional. They adopted two daughters, aged 13 and 15, in 2019.

=== Career ===
In 2007, Berkovich graduated from the Russian State Institute of Performing Arts with a degree in theatre management. From 2003 to 2008, she worked at the Theatre of Youth Creativity in St Petersburg as a director and a teacher. In 2008, she enrolled at the Moscow Art Theatre School with a specialisation in directing, on Kirill Serebrennikov's course. During her studies, together with directors Ilya Shagalov, Maxim Myshansky and Alexander Sozonov, she worked on the poetic performance Red Branch [Poetry of Megapolis], shown at Winzavod.

She staged The Lark as her graduation work. The play, shown in 2012 in at the Moscow Chekhov Art Theatre, used the trial of Joan of Arc as a metaphor for Russian court justice.

That same year, as part of the ‘Platform project’ at the Winzavod, she staged the Russian premiere of Sergej Newski's opera Autland, based on texts and poems by people with ASD. The production has received mixed reviews from critics, some praised it for a "naive but accurate reflection" of Nevsky's music, while others mentioned ‘the flat drama and the cute but unnecessary directing’. Berković's next work, the play "The Man Who Didn't Work. The Trial of Joseph Brodsky" (2012) was also met with a mixed reception. The play was based on Brodsky's poetry and Frida Vigdorova's recording of his trial. Among her other works, the theatre community noted her "Sunny Line" based on Ivan Vyrypaev's play. The play was shown in 2018 at the New Stage of the Alexandrinsky Theatre.

In 2018, Berkovich founded the independent theater company Daughters of SOSO. The first production of the project was Berkovich's play Counting game based on the eponymous book by Tamta Melashvili, a story about two teenage girls during the Georgian-Abkhazian war. Next, she staged plays Our Treasure and Rice Dog.

In 2020, Berkovich staged a play “Finist the Brave Falcon”, written by Svetlana Petriychuk in 2019. In 2022, the play received a Best Costume Designer award at the Golden Mask festival, Petriychuk won the Best Playwright award for her work. The play is based on real life stories of Russian women who married radical Islamists and moved to Syria. Some of them returned to Russia and were arrested and trialed for assisting terrorism.

Through the years, Berkovich was very active in charity. Among her projects were the “I’m not alone” festival and camp for children living in orphanages. During the camp the children, with the help of professional directors, staged five performances which were then performed in Moscow's leading theatres.

=== State pressure and arrest ===
In May 2022, Berkovich wrote two poems about the 2022 Russian Invasion of Ukraine. In the first one, a veteran grandfather appears to his grandson in 2022 and asks him not to wear his portrait in the parade. In the second poem she wrote about the Mariupol theatre airstrike. She also participated in a protest against the invasion on the day it began, for which she was arrested and held in an arrest for 11 days.

According to TV Rain, Russian media mogul Nikita Mikhalkov denounced Berkovich, Petriychuk, and the play "Finist the Brave Falcon" to Aleksandr Bastrykin, head of the Investigative Committee of Russia. This served as the catalyst for their arrest.

On May 4, 2023, Berkovich and her colleague Svetlana Petriychuk, also a playwright and a screenwriter, were arrested as suspects in a criminal case on “justifying terrorism” (Public calls for terrorist activities or public justification of terrorism, criminalised under Article 205.2 of the Criminal Code of Russia) in “Finist the Brave Falcon”. The criminal investigation against Berkovich and Petriychuk was opened following a report from the ultra-conservative and far-right “National Liberation Movement of Russia”. Another denunciation of the play was written by an actor from Nizhny Novgorod Vladimir Karpuk. Notably, the examination and the accompanying 125-page report were completed in just one day on 3 May. On May 4, the houses of Berkovich's mother and grandmother were searched by the police. On May 5, both Berkovich and Petriychuk were put into a pre-trial Lefortovo Prison for two months. The prosecution relied on an expert examination by Roman Silantyev, who found in the play ‘numerous justifications of ISIS’, and called its feminist approach ‘radical’ and threatening the Russian State. A group of lead Russian scientists published a letter, which states that the proposed by Silantyev "destructology" science used in his expert examination has features of pseudoscience and cannot be used in forensic expertise.

The case has caused a wide public outcry. After the arrest, Novaya Gazeta published an open letter of support, demanding the immediate release of both women. Dmitry Muratov expressed support for the theatermakers and called the case against them political persecution. Independent experts mentioned that the play carried a clear anti-terrorist message. The letter was signed by more than 16,000 people. Amnesty International urged Russian authorities to release the women.

The detainment of Berkovich and Petriychuk was extended multiple times. In September, their detainment was extended. In November, their detainment was again extended, this time to 10 January 2024. On 9 January 2024, their detainment was extended to 10 March 2024. On 7 March 2024, their detainment was extended to 10 April 2024. In May 2024, their detainment was extended to October 2024. In April 2024, Berkovich and Petriychuk were added to Rosfinmonitoring's list of terrorists and extremists.

On 20 November 2023, after the announcement of the death of Berkovich's grandmother Nina Katerli, 23 Russian public figures, including former talk show host Ivan Urgant, Nobel Laureate Dmitriy Muratov, and actors Chulpan Khamatova and Yevgeny Mironov, wrote an open letter to Commissioner for Human Rights Tatyana Moskalkova, asking her for her aid in the release of Berkovich so that Berkovich could pay her respects to her grandmother. The letter was published in Novaya Gazeta. Berkovich was allowed to attend her grandmother's funeral, and then returned to detainment.

She later described the journey as torture because she spent 25 hours in a prisoner transport van without heating, warm clothing, food and water. According to her, it was impossible to stand, sit or sleep, and she was only allowed to go to the toilet twice. The prison administration forbade the transmission of letters to Berkovich on the grounds that too many of the messages did not pass the prison censorship.

The trial of Berkovich and Petriychuk began on 20 May 2024. At the 2024 Cannes Film Festival, Serebrennikov, during the screening of his film Limonov: The Ballad, held up a photo of them in protest of their detention and trial.

=== Sentence ===
On 8 July 2024, judge Yury Massin sentenced Berkovich and Petriychuk to 6 years in prison. The sentence was widely condemned by colleagues from the art world.

On 15 November 2024, Berkovich announced that she was suspending Daughters of SOSO project and withdrawing all her plays.

On December 25, 2024, the Court of Appeal commuted Berkovich's sentence, though reducing it by only 5 months.

On February 6, 2025, Berkovich was transferred to penal colony number 3 in the village of Pribrezhny, Kostroma region. By that point, Berkovich had spent more than 600 days in pre-trial detention.

=== After the arrest ===
While in the colony, Berkovich runs a theatre group and currently works on a play about World War II. In March 2026, the director’s mother said that conditions in detention were harsh, that Berkovich was denied the antidepressants prescribed by her doctor, and that she was only allowed 15 minutes of phone calls to her family each month.

== Bibliography ==
The first volume of Berkovich's poetry against the war and from prison has been published in French :

- Car février n'en finit plus…, edition directed and published by Alexey Voïnov, translated in French by Eva Antonnikov, Nastasia Dahuron, Marion Graf, Eva Graphova, Guilhem Pousson, Marina Skalova et Christine Zeytounian-Beloüs, illustration by Varvara Rosenthal, Paris,Tourgueneff, 2026, 154 p. ISBN 978-2-489112-20-7.
