= Silantyev =

Silantyev or Silantiev (Russian: Сила́нтьев) is a family name of East Slavic origin. The feminine forms are Silantyeva or Silantieva. The surname may refer to:

- Roman Silantyev, a Russian sociologist
- Alexander Petrovich Silantyev, a Soviet Air Force marshal
- Dennis Silantiev, a Ukrainian swimmer (world gold medal in 1998)
