= Theatre of Nations =

- Государственный театр наций
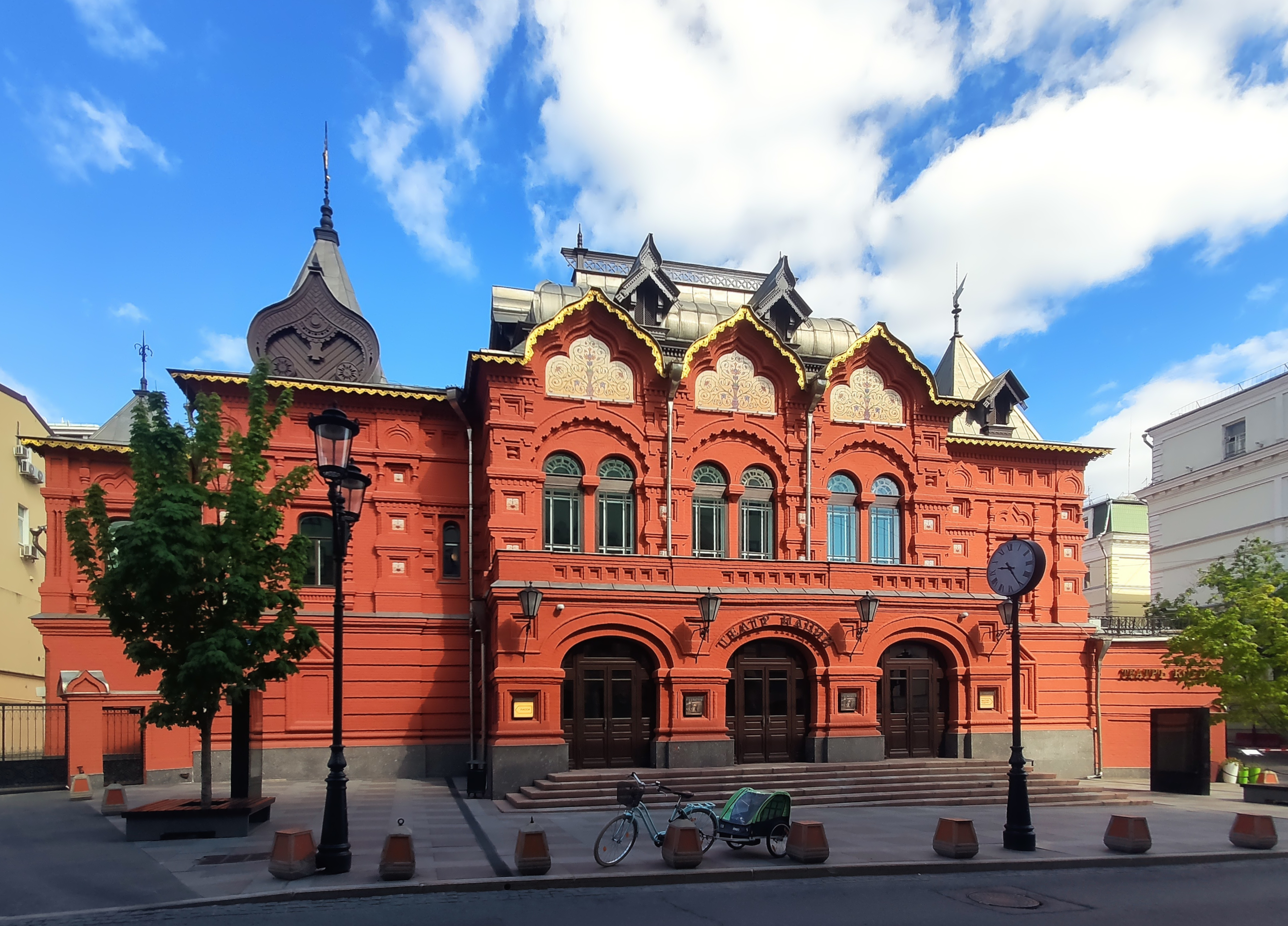
- Interactive map of Theatre of Nations
- Address: Moscow; Russia
- Coordinates: 55°45′57″N 37°36′46″E

Construction
- Opened: 1885

Website
- www.theatreofnations.ru

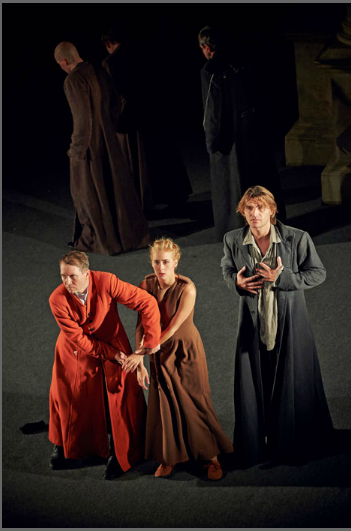
Caligula, touring in Vicenza, Italy

The Theatre of Nations, also known as the State Theatre of Nations (Russian: Госуда́рственный теа́тр на́ций), is a theatre located in the heritage-listed building originally built in 1885 as the Korsh Theatre in central Moscow, Russia. The theatre has no resident acting company.

It has a wider scope and versatility than most national theatres, with its remit including conducting national and multinational arts festivals; preserving cultural ties between Russia and the countries of the former Soviet Union; introducing local audiences to notable international arts achievements; and showcasing the experimental work of emerging actors and directors as well as established local and international directors. Several of its shows have toured the world over many years.

== History ==
=== Building ===
The theatre building was original built for entrepreneur Fyodor Korsh's theatre, known as the Korsh Theatre, which was one of the first privately owned Russian theatres, opening in 1885. Designed by architect Mikhail Chichagov, the building had many features of modern technology, including being lit by electricity, which was new at the time.

After the Russian Revolution in 1917, the Korsh Theatre went through various changes of management and names, until in its final iteration as the Moscow Arts Theatre, it was disbanded in 1932/3, and the building became part of the Moscow Art Theatre (renamed the Gorky Moscow Art Theatre).

=== The theatre ===
The Theatre of Peoples' Friendship, or Friendship of Nations theatre, (Russian: Театр Дружбы Народов) was created in 1987, shortly before the end of the Soviet era, with the intention of showcasing the best theatre from each of the Soviet Republics. After the Soviet Union disintegrated, the theatre started inviting directors from the former republics as well as around the world.

It was then based on Tverskoy Boulevard, but later exchanged locations with the Gorky Moscow Art Theatre, and in 1991 changed its name to the Theatre of Nations.

In 2006, actor and director Yevgeny Mironov became Artistic Director, but in the following year, the heritage-listed building closed for extensive renovations. The theatre reopened in 2012, with seating reduced from 1,065 to 600 and the lower ground floor rebuilt, with a small second stage for experimental work. Two rehearsal rooms were added to the main building, and the technical facilities, including lighting, video, sound, and stage mechanics were updated with state-of-the-art equipment. However, the sound system proved faulty, so it was replaced with d&b audiotechnik equipment.

In 2010 the State Ministry of Culture granted the Theatre of Nations a contract to develop a multi-step program geared towards the advancement of theatrical culture in the Russian provinces. Every month the theatre would choose a small town to visit with activities that include professional criticism of local productions, readings of new plays, master classes and seminars.

The theatre continued to stage productions through the COVID-19 pandemic in Russia.

== Description ==
The theatre is situated at 3 Petrovsky Lane, Moscow. The closest Moscow metro stations are Chekhovskaya, Pushkinskaya, and Tverskaya.

The theatre does not have a resident acting troupe, but does have an artistic director, a position as of 2021 held by actor and director Yevgeny Mironov. The theatre gives preference to contemporary drama, or old classics reinterpreted through a modern lens.

== Activities ==
The theatre's ongoing activities include:

- Conducting national and multinational arts festivals
- Preserving cultural ties between Russia and the countries of the former Soviet Union
- Introducing local audiences to notable achievements of the international art scene
- Providing experimental grounds for young actors and directors

It has a wider scope and versatility than most national theatres.

== Selected productions ==
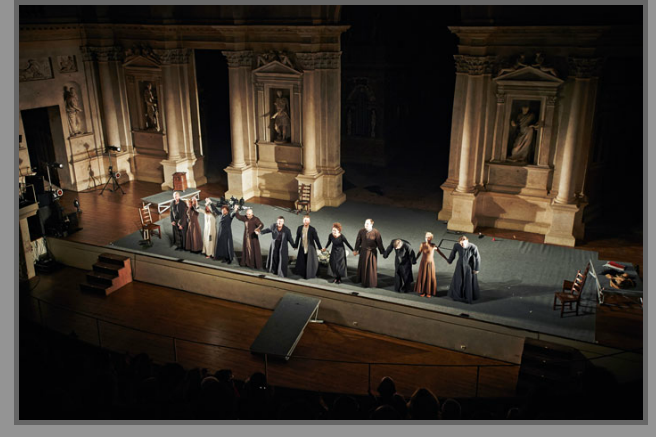
Caligula performance in Vicenza, Italy

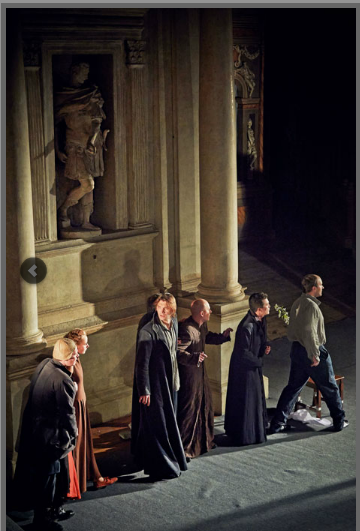
Caligula

The theatre produces its own shows, with its premieres including Andrii Zholdak's staging of An Experiment in Assimilating "The Seagull" by the Stanislavsky Method in 2001 as part of the World Theatre Olympics; Bullfinches, based on the Victor Astafiev novel The Cursed and the Slain; and Anton Chekhov's short story The Swedish Match.

The theatre has staged productions by many esteemed Russian and foreign directors, including:

- Robert Lepage from Canada (Hamlet | Collage, 2014)
- Eimuntas Nekrošius from Lithuania (Caligula, 2012)
- Robert Wilson from the United States (Pushkin's Fairy Tales)
- Dmitry Volkostrelov (Three Days in Hell)
- Timofey Kulyabin (#shakespearsonnets)
- Philip Grigoryan (The Stone)
- Luc Bondy (France)
- Eimuntas Nekrosius (Lithuania)
- Thomas Ostermeier (Germany)
- Javor Gardev (Bulgaria)
- Andrey Moguchy (Russia)

Young directors showcased by the theatre include Nikita Grinshpun, Tufan Imamutdinov, Timofei Kulyabin, and Dmitry Volkostrelov.

For the 2008/9 theatre season, Latvian theatre director Alvis Hermanis adapted eight of Vasily Shukshin's short stories for stage in a collaboration with the Theatre of Nations, entitled Shukshin's Stories (or Shukshin's Tales). As of 2021 it is still touring the world, and has won several awards. Starring Evgeny Mironov and Chulpan Khamatova, the play toured to New York City in 2016 and was staged at The Barbican in London in October 2019.

Lepage's Hamlet | Collage, for the most part a one-man show, brought mixed reviews on its 2014 run in Moscow. It was praised for its technical brilliance and visual splendour, but The Moscow Times reviewer was left unimpressed by the performance. The show subsequently toured abroad, including to Singapore in 2016, where a critic mostly concurred with the Moscow review.

Eimuntas Nekrošius' staging of Albert Camus' Caligula, translated by Russian writer Oleg Postnov and Gorny, with Mironov in the title role won the Golden Mask in 2012. The TV Channel Moskva 24 reported strong interest in the four-hour play. The theatre televised its production of Caligula in 2014.

In 2018, a production of Anton Chekhov's Ivanov played at the New York City Center, directed by Timofey Kulyabin and starring actors Evgeny Mironov, Chulpan Khamatova, Elizaveta Boyarskaya, and Victor Verzhbitskiy.

In 2020/2021, the theatre staged a production called Gorbachev, with Yevgeniy Mironov and Chulpan Khamatova on stage, in a second collaboration with Alvis Hermanis. The play focuses on the relationship of Mikhail Gorbachev and his wife Raisa Gorbacheva.

=== Touring shows ===
The Theatre of Nations has hosted touring shows, including King Lear and Robert Sturua's production of Bertold Brecht's The Caucasian Chalk Circle from the Tbilisi Rustaveli theatre; Anton Chekhov's Uncle Vanya and Vadim Korostylyov's Pirosmani, Pirosmani from Eimuntas Nekrošius (The Lithuanian Youth theatre); Chekhov's The Cherry Orchard from Peter Brook (Brooklyn Academy of Music); Fedor Abramov's Brothers and Sisters from Lev Dodin (The St. Petersburg Maly Dramatic Theatre); Gregory Kanovich's Smile upon Us, Lord from the State Small Theatre of Vilnius (directed by Rimas Tuminas); Marivaux' La Surprise de l'amour from Jean-Pierre Vincent (Théâtre Nanterre-Amandiers); Madame Marguerite, French artist Annie Girardot's one-woman show; productions by the traditional Japanese Noh theatre; and many others.

== Awards ==
The Theatre of Nations has been honoured by many awards, including:

- Flies (2006), by dancer choreographers Anna Abalikhina and Dina Husein, was nominated for Golden Mask Awards for Best Production and Best Female Dancer in the Modern Dance categories.
- Andrii Zholdak's Phaedra: Golden Braid (2007), was nominated for Best Director, Best Design, and Best Actress in the Small-Scale Dramatic Production in the Golden Masks. Maria Mironova won Best Actress for her role as Phaedra.
- The Swiss Match received the Crystal Turandot Award in the Best Debut category.
- Shukshin's Stories received three Crystal Turandot awards in 2009 and three Golden Mask awards in 2010.

== Festivals ==
The theatre is the headquarters for one of Russia's most significant theatrical events – The TERRITORIЯ Festival, co-founded by Mironov.

The theatre has created festivals as the Opera Parade and the Opera Panorama, Russia's National Treasure and the Mini-Avignon, the Window to the Netherlands and the Strindberg in Moscow, the Russian-Turkish festival of contemporary dramaturgy and Japanese drum shows. Smaller festivals include the Small-Town theatres of Russia Festival and Theatre Town, which exports to the capital the theatre activities of an entire town – the first festival to pave the way to Moscow for many provincial theatres. Some of these festivals have been taken outside of Moscow: the Summer of Theatre festival in Krasnodar; the Opera Panorama and the Okinawa multicultural festival in Samara; Hard Currency, a festival of Russian theatre, to London, England; and the Small-Town Theatres of Russia Festival to Lysva.

The Theatre of Nations has a history of initiating festivals and granting them autonomy, including the Hersones Games, The Moscow Performance International Music and Theatre Festival of Authentic Arts, the international festival of one-actor shows.

In 2009 the theatre introduced the Shekspir@Shakespeare Festival, which opened on 5 October with Israel's Cameri Theatre's Hamlet, staged by director-in-residence Omri Nitzan.

== Dance ==
The Theatre of Nations was a pioneer in contemporary dance, conducting the first two international contemporary dance festivals locally in 1993 and 1995.
