= Timofey Kulyabin =

Russian theater and opera director (born 1984)

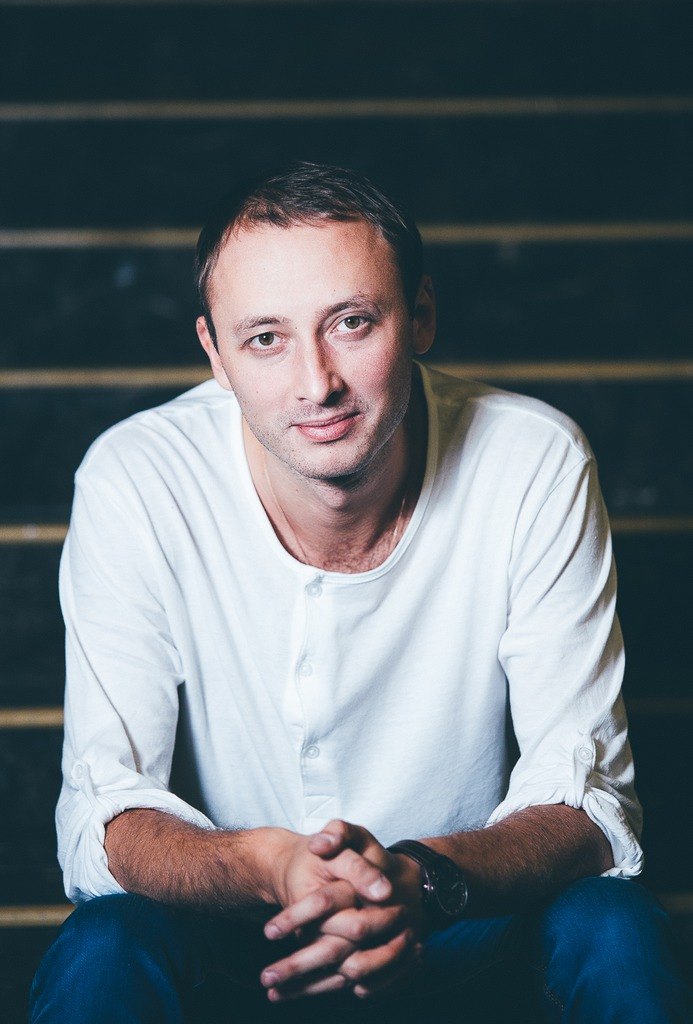
- Born: Timofey Aleksandrovich Kulyabin; 10 October 1984 (age 41); Izhevsk, Soviet Union
- Education: Russian Institute of Theatre Arts
- Occupation: Theater director

Timofey Aleksandrovich Kulyabin (Russian: Тимофей Александрович Кулябин; born 10 October 1984, Izhevsk) is a Russian theater and opera director.

== Biography ==
Kulyabin was one of the most prominent young theatre directors in Russia before his relocation to Europe. After graduating from the Russian Institute of Theatre Arts (course of Oleg Kudryashov) in 2007 he is successfully working in drama and opera theatres throughout the country and abroad. Kulyabin has worked on 15 drama and 2 opera productions. Critics mark his ability to switch between large and chamber stages with equally strong and original concepts. His productions of the classic dramas and operas positively impact the professional and non-professional theater communities. Kulyabin's Onegin in the Red Torch theatre has been awarded a special prize of the Russian Performing Arts Festival and National Theater Award Golden Mask.

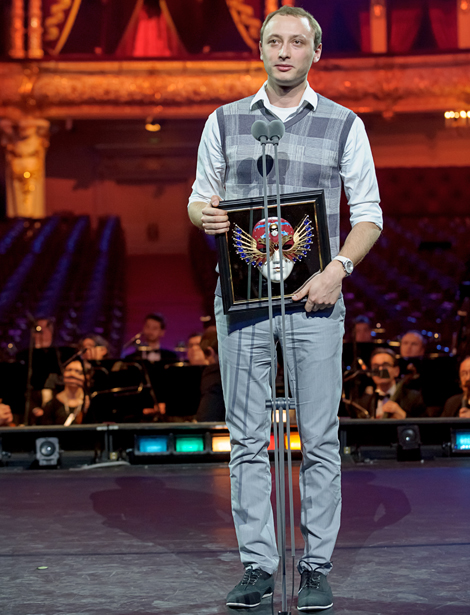
Timofey Kulyabin nominated by Golden Mask award

External image
- Tannhäuser Venusberg scene

His production of Wagner's Tannhäuser in December 2014 was met by great critical acclaim in Novosibirsk Opera and Ballet Theatre. Its cast included Wagnerian Heldentenor Stig Fogh Andersen, Irina Churilova as Elisabeth, and Dmitry Ulyanov as Landgrave. Some aspect of the production, notably the depiction of Tannhäuser in the Venusberg scene, led to criminal proceedings following a complaint by the Orthodox archbishop of Novosibirsk and Berdsk, Tikhon (Leonid Grigoryevich Yemelyanov). The accusation was supported before the court by the deputy prosecutor of Novosibirsk, Igor Stasyulis, who shared the fascist views of Aleksandr Dugin and had maintained close links with orthodox fundamentalists such as Dmitry Enteo. A magistrate court later dismissed those allegations. Stasyulis appealed this decision but subsequently had to withdraw his appeal. Later, the Minister of Culture, Vladimir Medinsky, dismissed the theatre's director, Boris Mezdrich, and appointed Vladimir Kekhman as the new director, who then canceled all further performances.

After the success of his Onegin and #shakespearsonnets in the Theatre of Nations in Moscow, he has been invited to the Bolshoi Theatre to create a new Don Pasquala production in April 2016. Recently Kulyabin took the position of artistic director of the Red Torch theatre in Novosibirsk.

On May 2, 2022, the Bolshoi announced the cancellation of further performances of his adaptation of Don Pasquala. Kulyabin had left Russia due to his criticism of the Russo-Ukrainian War. Kulyabin is now believed to be based in Europe.

== Productions ==
- 2006: Down the Nevsky Avenue after Nikolai Gogol's short story "Nevsky Prospekt" (Academic Drama Theatre, Omsk)
- 2007: The Queen of Spades after Alexander Pushkin's short story "The Queen of Spades" (Red Torch Theatre, Novosibirsk)
- 2007: Livejournal (Russian Drama Theatre, Riga)
- 2008: Death Defying Acts by Oleg Antonov (Red Torch Theatre, Novosibirsk)
- 2008: Jolly Roger by Damir Salimzyanov (Red Torch Theatre, Novosibirsk)
- 2008: Macbeth by William Shakespeare (Red Torch Theatre, Novosibirsk)
- 2009: Prince Igor by Alexander Borodin (Opera and Ballet Theatre, Novosibirsk)
- 2009: Masquerade by Mikhail Lermontov (Red Torch Theatre, Novosibirsk)
- 2010: Carmen after Prosper Mérimée's novella Carmen (Volkov Drama Theatre, Yaroslavl)
- 2010: No Words (Red Torch Theatre, Novosibirsk)
- 2012: Dress Code after Nikolai Gogol's short story "The Overcoat" (Comedian's Shelter Theatre, St. Petersburg)
- 2012: Onegin after Alexander Pushkin's novel Eugene Onegin (Red Torch Theatre, Novosibirsk)
- 2012: Hedda Gabler by Henrik Ibsen (Red Torch Theatre, Novosibirsk)
- 2013: Electra by Euripides (State Theatre of Nations, Moscow)
- 2013: Kill after Friedrich Schiller's Intrigue and Love, (Red Torch Theatre, Novosibirsk)
- 2014: #shakespearsonnets (State Theatre of Nations, Moscow)
- 2014: Tannhäuser by Richard Wagner (Opera and Ballet Theatre, Novosibirsk)
- 2015: Three sisters by Anton Chekhov (Red Torch Theatre, Novosibirsk)
- 2016: Don Pasquale by Gaetano Donizetti (Bolshoi Theatre, Moscow)
- 2017: The Trial by Franz Kafka (Red Torch Theatre, Novosibirsk)
- 2017: Rigoletto by Giuseppe Verdi (Opernhaus Wuppertal)
- 2022: In the Solitude of Cotton Fields by Bernard-Marie Koltès (Dailes Theatre, Riga)
- 2022: Nora by Henrik Ibsen (Ivan Vazov National Theatre, Sofia)

== Awards ==
- 2007

«The Queen of Spades» after Alexander Pushkin

All-Russian Festival «Volga Theatre Seasons» in Samara; award in «Best Director» nomination.

Theatre Festival/Contest «Paradise» organized by Novosibirsk Branch of the Russian Theatre Association; award in «Best Director’s Debut» nomination.

- 2008

«A Mortal Trick» by Oleg Antonov

Theatre Festival «Siberian Transit» in Barnaul; an honorary diploma.

- 2009

«Macbeth» by William Shakespeare

Regional Theatre Festival «Paradise» in Novosibirsk; award in «The Best Staging Concept» nomination.

- 2010

Award «A Person of the Year» of culture and art (Novosibirsk)

- 2013

«Electra» by Euripides

Theatre award of Moscow daily newspaper « Moskovskij Komsomolets», award in best small scale production nomination

«Onegin» by Alexander Pushkin

National Theatre Festival «Golden Mask», Drama and Puppet Theatre Jury's Special Award

- 2014

«Kill» «Best production» award of Theatre Festival «New Siberian Transit»

- 2015

Personal Grant of the Government of Russian Federation

«#shakespearsonnets»

Theatre award of Moscow daily newspaper « Moskovskij Komsomolets», award in best small scale production nomination

- 2016

«Tannhäuser» by Richard Wagner

«Production of the year» award by magazine «Muzykalnoye obozrenie»

Audience сhoice award «Teatral», award in best musical production nomination

«Three sisters» by Anton Chekhov

«Production of the year» award by Theatre Critics Association

- 2017

«The three sisters» by Anton Chekhov

National Theatre Festival «Golden Mask», Drama and Puppet Theatre Jury's Special Award «Ensemble in the play»

- 2017

Europe Theatre Prize

Nomination for the Europe Prize Theatrical Realities
