= Smeds =

Smeds is a surname. Notable people with the surname include:

- Boris Smeds (born 1944), Swedish radio engineer
- Dave Smeds (born 1955), American writer
- Kristian Smeds (born 1970), Finnish playwright and theatre director
- Viktor Smeds (1885–1957), Finnish gymnast
