= Moguchy =

Moguchy (masculine; Russian: Могучий, meaning powerful; feminine form: Moguchaya) may refer to

- Aleksandra Moguchaia (born 1990), Russian Paralympic athlete
- Andrey Moguchy (born 1961), Russian stage director
- Yaroslava Mahuchikh (born 2001), Ukrainian high jumper
- Moguchy, a rural locality in Balakhtinsky District, Krasnoyarsk Krai, Russia
