= Evgeny Brazhnik =

Russian conductor (1945–2023)

- Евгений Бражник
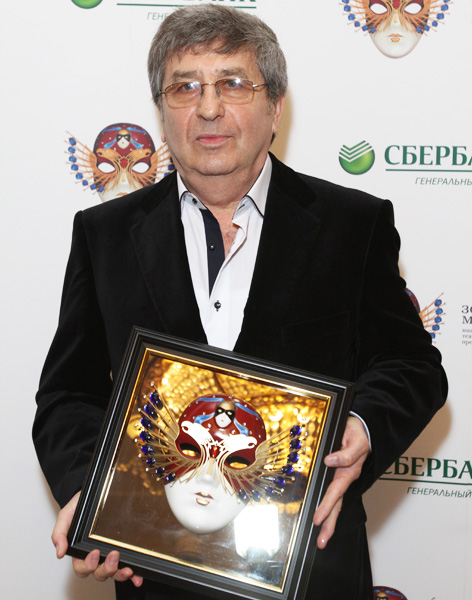
- Evgeny Brazhnik in 2012
- Born: February 25, 1945; Magnitogorsk, Chelyabinsk Oblast, Russian SFSR, Soviet Union
- Died: September 10, 2023 (aged 78)
- Education: Saint Petersburg Conservatory, Urals Mussorgsky State Conservatoire
- Occupation: Conductor
- Awards: USSR State Prize; People's Artist of Russia

Evgeny Vladimirovich Brazhnik (Russian: Евгений Владимирович Бражник; [sometimes anglicised as Eugene Brazhnik]; 25 February 1945 – 10 September 2023) was a Soviet and Russian conductor. He was a recipient of both the USSR State Prize and People's Artist of Russia.

== Biography ==
Brazhnik was born on 25 February 1945 in Magnitogorsk. He was educated at both Saint Petersburg and Ural conservatories and later performed over 50 operas in such countries as China, Czech Republic, France, Germany, Israel, Poland, South Korea, Spain, and the United States. One of his first performances was The Legend of the Invisible City of Kitezh and the Maiden Fevroniya which he was a conductor of at the time but became known more for his conducting of David Lloyd-Jones' version of Boris Godunov which was performed at the Yekaterinburg Opera for the first time in Russian history. Since 1999 he had worked for the Helikon Opera and by 2012 became the Golden Mask recipient for his conducting of The Tales of Hoffmann which was performed in Moscow's Stanislavski and Nemirovich-Danchenko Moscow Academic Music Theatre. Brazhnik died on 10 September 2023, at the age of 78.
