= Grotowski Institute in Wrocław =

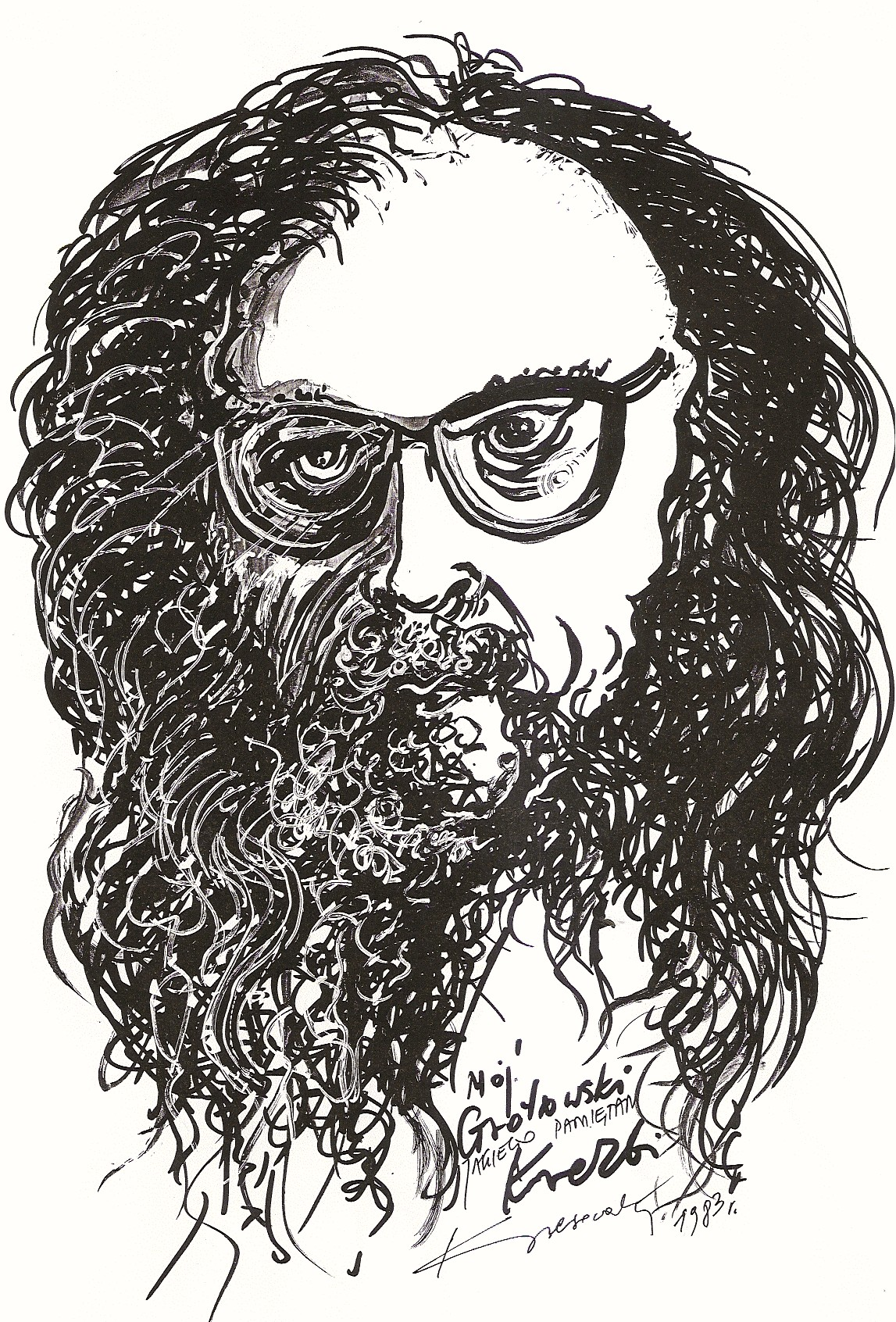
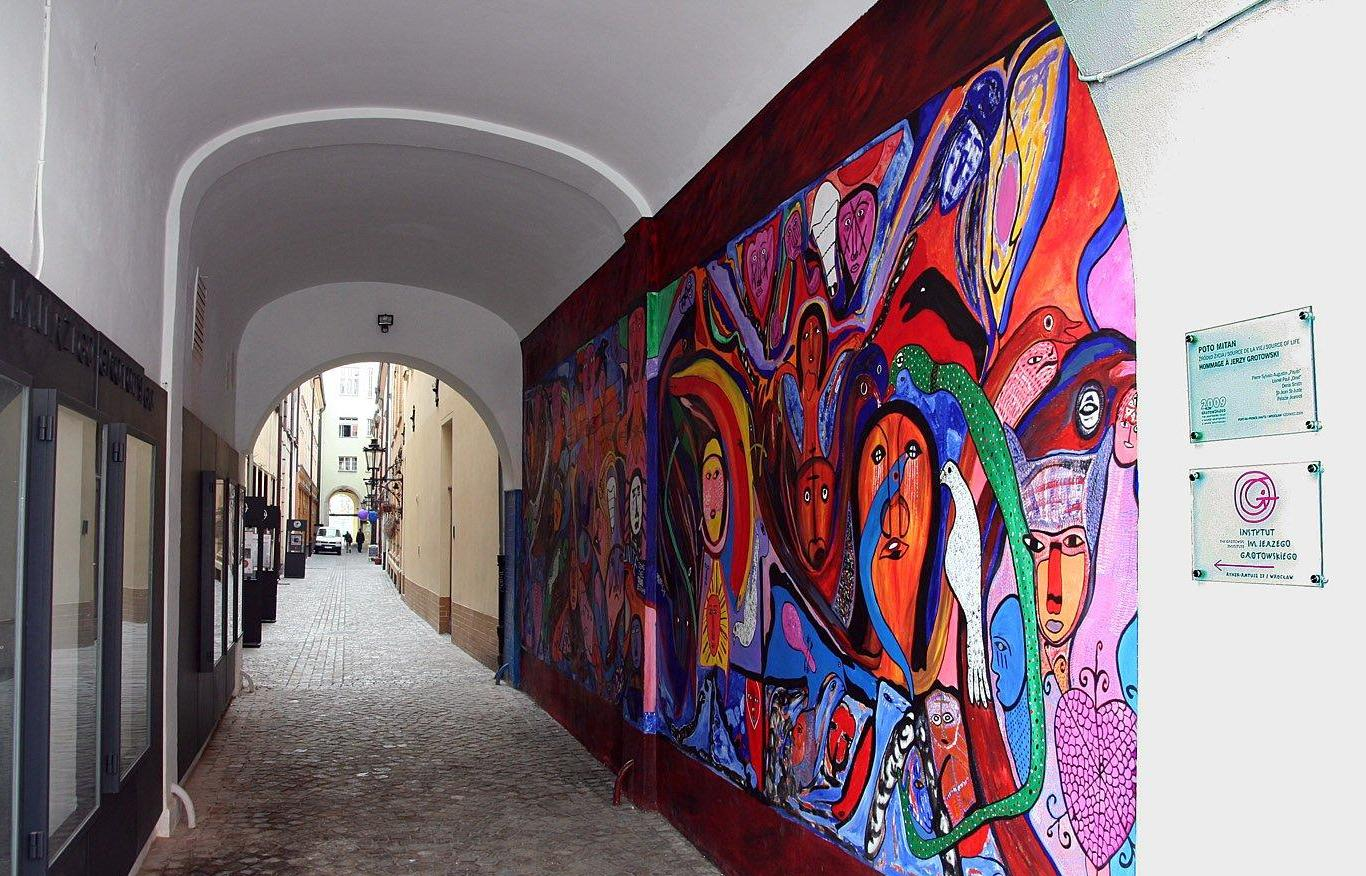
Jerzy Grotowski and the Institute at 27 Rynek-Ratusz

The Grotowski Institute in Wrocław (Instytut im. Jerzego Grotowskiego) is the development of the "Centre for Study of Jerzy Grotowski’s Work and for Cultural and Theatrical Research" (A.K.A. the Grotowski Centre), on 28 December 2006 was transformed into the Grotowski Institute. In the years between 1965 and 1984 Jerzy Grotowski operated in his theatre which now is the headquarter of the institute at 27 Rynek-Ratusz in Wrocław. The first name of the institution given by Grotowski was Laboratory Theatre, in the period when his work was carried out in Wrocław, and then also Institute for Studies of the Method of Acting.
