= Svetlana Petriychuk =

Russian theater director (born 1980)

- Светлана Петрийчук
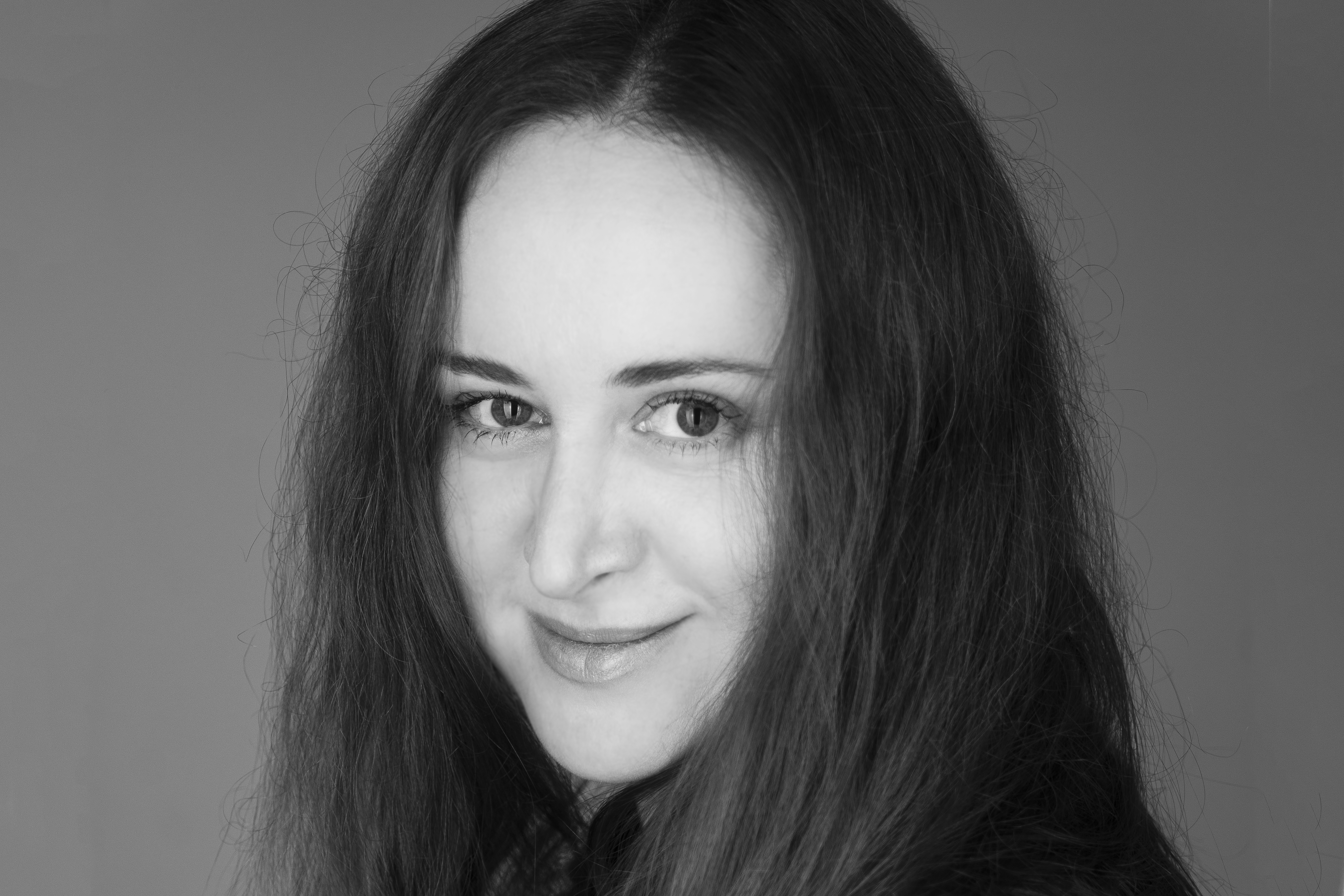
- Svetlana Petriychuk (2020)
- Born: April 22, 1980 (age 45); Frunze, Kyrgyz SSR, Soviet Union

Svetlana Aleksandrovna Petriychuk (Russian: Светлана Александровна Петрийчук; born April 22, 1980) is a Russian playwright, theatre and cinema director, and teacher.

On 4 May 2023, she was arrested alongside Evgenia Berkovich on allegations of justifying terrorism. On 8 July 2024, both were sentenced to six years in prison.

== Biography ==
=== Career ===
Svetlana Petriychuk was born on April 22, 1980 in Frunze, the capital of the Kyrgyz SSR (now Kyrgyzstan). She graduated from the Kyrgyz-Slavic University with a degree in international journalism. In the 2000s, she often visited Almaty and worked on Kazakhstani television. She later went to the United States and studied film at Los Angeles. After moving to Moscow, she was primarily involved in film projects. In 2018, she graduated from the Konstantin Raykin Graduate School of Performing Arts (workshop of Kama Ginkas). Later she studied in Mikhail Ugarov's workshop at Theater.doc.

In 2018, she made her debut at the Lyubimovka Festival of Young Playwrights with the play Tuesday is a Short Day. In the following years, Svetlana Petriychuk has repeatedly become a winner and finalist of various competitions and festivals, including the international competition “Remarque”, the competition-festival “First Reading” within the framework of the festival “Five Evenings” named after A. M. Volodin, the international laboratory LARK (New York), and others.

In 2019, Petriychuk wrote Finist, the Brave Falcon, a play based on real life stories of Russian women who were lured to marry radical Islamists and move to Syria. Some of them returned to Russia and were arrested and trialed for assisting terrorism. Although the play draws on a fairy tale setting, it is based on real police files and transcripts of interrogation reports. Finist, the Brave Falcon was supported by the Russian Culture Ministry and won two Golden Mask awards in 2022: Best Playwright (Petriychuk) and Best Costume Design. In 2019, it was praised by the Russian state penitentiary service on its official website after the play was read to inmates of a women's prison in Siberia.

In 2021, Petriychuk was one of the three winners of the Culmination Award with her play Tuaregs.

In 2023, together with Evgenia Berkovich, Petriychuk won the Anna Politkovskaya Kamerton Award.

Svetlana Petriychuk worked extensively in Kazakhstan: she was a creative producer in one of the production studios; she also wrote several scripts there, and directed a feature film.

=== Theater case and arrest ===
On May 4, 2023, Petriychuk and Berkovich were detained by police in a criminal case under Article 205.2 of the Criminal Code of the Russian Federation “Public calls to carry out terrorist activities, public justification of terrorism or propaganda of terrorism”.

Officially, the criminal investigation against Berkovich and Petriychuk was opened following a report from the ultra-conservative and far-right “National Liberation Movement of Russia”. Another denunciation of the play was written by an actor from Nizhny Novgorod Vladimir Karpuk. Notably, the examination and the accompanying 125-page report were completed in just one day on 3 May. However, according to TV Rain, it was media mogul Nikita Mikhalkov who denounced Berkovich, Petriychuk, and the play "Finist the Brave Falcon" to Aleksandr Bastrykin, head of the Investigative Committee of Russia. This served as the catalyst for their arrest.

The arrest has caused a wide public outcry. After the arrest, Novaya Gazeta published an open letter of support, demanding the immediate release of both women. Dmitry Muratov expressed support for the theatermakers and called the case against them political persecution. Independent experts mentioned that the play carried a clear anti-terrorist message. The letter was signed by more than 16,000 people. Amnesty International urged Russian authorities to release the women.

On May 5, 2023, Moscow Zamoskvoretsky District Court Judge Natalia Cheprasova put Petriychuk in custody until July 4. After that, the decision on detention was extended more than six times, and the women spent more than a year in the pre-trial detention centre awaiting trial.

The trial started on 20 May, 2024. According to the prosecutor, in the play ‘women displayed positive opinions of ISIS’ and ‘the play did not sufficiently denounce radical Islamist ideologies’. Both Berkovich and Petriychuk denied accusations and stated that the play had been written and staged with a clear anti-terrorist message.

On July 8, 2024, judge Yury Massin sentenced Petriychuk and Berkovich to six years in prison. On December 25, 2024, the Court of Appeal commuted Petriychuk's sentence, though reducing it by only 2 months.

According to Petriychuk's husband Yuriy Shekhvatov, letters sent to her or written by her are checked by censors.

On February 11, 2025, after 649 days in pre-trial detention, Petriychuk was transferred from pre-trial detention centre No. 6 ‘Pechatniki’ in Moscow to a colony No.5 in Mozhaysk.

== After the arrest ==
In September 2024, Finist the Brave Falcon premiered in Greece staged by Konstantina Palli. In December 2024, BBC released an English-language audio adaptation of the play.

At the end of 2024, her play Tuesday is a Short Day was staged by Dan Ershov at Tallinn's Vene Theatre.

In 2023, Tuaregs. Seven texts for theatre, a collection of Petriychuk’s lesser-known works, was published by Freedom Letters publishing house.

== Selected works ==
=== Plays ===
- Finist the Brave Falcon;
- It's all Weinstein's fault;
- Tuesday is a Short Day;
- Comet G;
- Tuaregs;
- Pink Noise,
- Rice Water,
- ZAO.

=== Screenplays ===
- Collection of Olympic Games Essays, doc TV series, 2008;
- Hiddink, Guus Ivanovich, documentary, 2009;
- Punchbot, feature film, 2012;
- Сыргалым TV series, 2013-2014;
- How I Became Russian (TV series), 2015.
