= Golden Mask (Russian award) =

Russian theatre festival and award

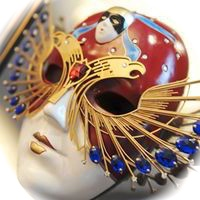
- Awarded for: National Theatre Award
- Country: Russia
- Presented by: Union of Theatre Workers of the Russian Federation
- First award: 1995; 31 years ago
- Website: eng.goldenmask.ru

Television/radio coverage
- Network: Channel One Russia

The Golden Mask (Russian: Золотая маска, Zolotaya maska) is a Russian theatre festival and the main national theatre award, established in 1994 by the Union of Theatre Workers of the Russian Federation. The award is given to productions in all genres of theatre art: drama, opera, ballet, operetta and musical, and puppet theatre. The festival takes place every spring in Moscow and presents the most significant performances from theaters all over Russia. The Golden Mask also includes annual tours of the best Russian productions all over the country and abroad, an online broadcast program, the "Golden Mask in cinema" initiative, and many more.

== History ==
=== Launch and early years ===
The establishment of the award was announced by Mikhail Ulyanov and Vladimir Urin at a press conference at the Union of Theatre Workers of Russia on the 14th of December, 1994. Georgy Taratorkin became the award's president (he served in this post until his death in 2017). The award was meant to be non-commercial, with the winners receiving only the trophy mask and a diploma. Ulyanov believed that it should be an independent professional award, given for theatrical achievements, "from colleagues to colleagues". Initially the award was focused only on Moscow theatre; the first awards (seven masks for the 1993–94 season) were presented in 1995.

The award was designed by Oleg Sheyncis in 1993. As stated by the artist, he took inspiration from masks of the Carnival of Venice and added to it an element of Russian state symbolism, the double-headed eagle. Sheyncis created the first seven pieces in papier-mâché for the first ceremony. Each mask took him a month to craft; later the masks were made of ceramic.

In 1996, Eduard Boyakov took over the management of the festival. As recalled by Natalia Nikolaeva, the award's director of public relations from 1998 to 2005, Boyakov was the main figure behind the future success of the Golden Mask. In 1996, drama, puppet theatre, opera and ballet were included in the award. During the 1998 Russian financial crisis, a team of only 10 people worked on sheer enthusiasm, organizing the award without any sponsorship or government support.

In February 1996, the Union of Theatre Workers announced the expansion of the award to an all-Russia level. However, it seemed impossible for the jury to attend the plays in remote areas of the country, while 250 premieres took place in Russia in the 1996–97 season alone. The management therefore decided to select all-Russian nominees for the award among the winners of regional and thematic festivals and from the repertoire of the Theatre of Nations. The results of the 1997 Golden Mask sparked a major scandal among critics, theatre professionals, and all parties involved, including the Ministry of Culture: four awards in main nominations went to The Woman in the Dunes by Omsk State Academic Drama Theater. The ceremony itself caused a wave of criticism. The idea of the ceremony, designed by Vladimir Mirzoyev, was "the funeral of the theatre in the 20th century". The hosts, Yuliya Rutberg and Sergei Makovetsky, were dressed as gravediggers, while Oksana Mysina delivered monologues on behalf of the ghost of Alisa Koonen. In an interview with the newspaper Izvestiya, Alexander Kalyagin, Chairman of the Union of Theatre Workers of the Russian Federation, admitted the fiasco with the 1997 ceremony but stressed that the Omsk theatre play had merited the awards it received. He said that he wanted "the Golden Masks to go further and further away from Moscow, and not only to settle in the capital's theatres. I wish that there would be discoveries, new names of talented artists, directors, and painters... I am sure there are such names in our vast country". Despite all criticism, in 2006 Boyakov confirmed that he considered the 1997 ceremony the best in the Golden Mask's history: after ten years everyone still remembered it and talked about it.

In 1999, the Operetta/Musical category was added, and a year later, Contemporary Dance. In 2001, the competition of dramatic performances was divided into Large Form Performance and Small Form Performance. With time, the award became the most important event in the Russian theatre world. In the 2000s and the 2010s, it was completely independent and equally distanced from the government, ministerial, sponsoring circles and the Theatre Union.

In 2002, Sberbank became the festival's general sponsor. For the only time, in 2003 the ceremony was held outside Moscow: in honour of the 300th anniversary of St. Petersburg, the Mariinsky theatre was chosen as the venue.

In 2005, Boyakov left the team and was succeeded by Maria Revyakina, whom he chose himself as a long-time colleague who shared his vision. Under Revyakina, the Golden Mask kept growing. The budget for the ceremony in 2005 reached $100,000. In 2007, the Ministry of Culture became a co-operator of the Golden Mask and put forward the requirement to include its candidates on the expert committee. In 2008, a nomination for lighting and costume designers was added to the competitive program. In 2013, a nomination for supporting roles was introduced. In addition to the spring Moscow festival and the award ceremony, the Golden Mask included annual tours of the best Russian productions all over the country and in the Baltic states, occasionally reaching other European countries like Poland and Israel.

=== 2013–2021 ===
By 2013, the festival included competitive and non-competitive programmes. The competitive part included such sections as Drama, Puppetry, Ballet, Opera, Dance, Musical, Opera, and New Names. The non-competitive program included the sections MaskaPlus, New Play, Context (for foreign plays), Mariinsky's Premieres, and many more. In 2016, the festival spanned three months, from the beginning of February to the end of April. The management team grew to 30, while the number of participants exceeded 5000.

Nomination of the scandalous Tannhäuser staged by Timofey Kulyabin in Novosibirsk Opera and Ballet Theatre sparked another major scandal. For the first time, the scandal went beyond the boundaries of the professional community and became public. Vladimir Aristarkhov, First Deputy Minister of Culture of the Russian Federation, sharply criticized the Golden Mask: in his opinion, the award supported productions that "obviously contradicted moral norms, obviously provoke society, obviously contain elements of Russophobia, contempt for the history of our country, and deliberately go beyond moral boundaries". He also expressed doubts that the state, represented by the Ministry of Culture, and the sponsor, represented by Sberbank, should financially support the festival". On 29 May 2015, the independent trade union of theatre and cinema actors, chaired by Denis Kiris, sent a letter to Culture Minister Vladimir Medinsky, in which it also criticized the Golden Mask. State functionaries Nikolai Burlyayev, Pavel Pozhigaylo described the award as immoral. An open letter signed by 93 critics from 12 regions of Russia demanded the dissolution of the Golden Mask Award Board as being created under the strong influence of the Ministry of Culture. As a result, Tannhäuser, which received most of the nominations for the Golden Mask, did not go to the festival in Moscow and by the time of the award ceremony had disappeared from the nominees. Kirill Serebrennikov and his Gogol Center publicly refused to participate in the award because some of the members of its expert committee had written denunciations and libel against him and his theatre. Following numerous discussions, public hearings and meetings of the working group specially created by the Union of Theatre Workers and the Ministry of Culture, the new "Regulations on the Golden Mask Award and Festival" were published on 4 April 2016. According to the new document, if the entire production is not nominated for the main category, then individual works in private categories such as Best Director, Best Actor, or Best Actress cannot be awarded.

In 2017, upon the demise of Taratorkin, Igor Kostolevsky took over as president of the Golden Mask. That year, in the special programme "Golden Mask in Cinema", four plays were shown on the big screen in 60 cities. Over the years, about 200 theatre and music critics have been experts at the Golden Mask, and almost 500 professionals have served on the jury. The non-competitive projects of the award include "Golden Mask Online". In 2021, more than 900 thousand viewers watched broadcasts of the programme. The list of nominees for the 2020–21 season included 81 performances by 67 theatres from 17 Russian cities.

=== Since 2022 ===
The 2020–2021 season was marked by a record number of nominees: 81 performances, 67 theatres, and 290 individual nominations among more than 1,150 productions reviewed by expert committees. By that time, the award had been given in 37 categories.

In December 2022, Revyakina, who in early 2022 signed an open letter of theatre professionals against the invasion of Ukraine, was dismissed from her position. In August 2023, the Union of Theatre Workers announced that it would withdraw from the autonomous non-profit organization Golden Mask Award and Festival and would create its independent award and festival. By September of the same year, a new legal entity of the festival and a new directorate were formed. In December 2023 Vladimir Mashkov became the president of the Golden Mask and Igor Krok became the vice president. Mashkov announced new priorities: to restore the trust of the professional community, the state and sponsors. According to the amended regulations, lists of candidates for expert committees and juries will have to be formed within the union, approved by its head and coordinated with the Ministry of Culture, while associations, guilds and other unions of theatre professionals will be deprived of the right to nominate candidates. The Union of Theatre Workers also plans to shorten the list of nominations. The long-list of the nominees for 2022–23 included 94 performances of drama theatre and puppet theatre and 21 performances of musical theatre. For the first time, no plays were brought to Moscow. No awards were presented in eight categories at the 2024 ceremony, notably, in Drama Theater category for Best Playwright, which had been won by Finist, the Brave Falcon by Evgenia Berkovich and Svetlana Petriychuk, and for which both women were arrested in 2023 on allegations of justifying terrorism.

== Nominees and recipients ==
=== 2012 ===
- Best opera production — The Tales of Hoffmann (Stanislavsky Opera)
- Best opera director — Georgy Isaakyan
- Best opera conductor — Evgeny Brazhnik
- Best opera actor — Willard White
- Best opera actress — Albina Shagimuratova
- Best composer — Leonid Desyatnikov

=== 2013 ===
- Best opera production — A Midsummer Night's Dream (Stanislavsky Opera)
- Best opera director — Dmitri Tcherniakov
- Best opera conductor — Teodor Currentzis
- Best opera actor — Ildar Abdrazakov
- Best opera actress — Nadine Koutcher
- Best musical actor — Ivan Ozhogin

=== 2014 ===
- Best opera production — Eugene Onegin (Mikhailovsky Theatre)
- Best opera director — Andriy Zholdak
- Best opera conductor — Jan Latham-Koenig
- Best opera actor — Maxim Mironov
- Best opera actress — Venera Gimadieva
- Special prize — Timofey Kulyabin

=== 2015 ===
- Best opera production — The Indian Queen (Perm Opera)
- Best opera director — Peter Sellars
- Best opera conductor — Teodor Currentzis
- Best opera actor — Dmitry Belosselskiy
- Best opera actress — Nadine Koutcher

=== 2016 ===
- Best opera production — The Khovansky Affair (Stanislavsky Opera)
- Best opera director — Alexander Titel
- Best opera conductor — Andrey Lebedev
- Best opera actor — Aleksey Tatarintsev
- Best opera actress — Hibla Gerzmava

=== 2017 ===
- Best opera production — Rodelinda (Bolshoi Theatre)
- Best opera director — Richard Jones
- Best opera conductor — Teodor Currentzis
- Best opera actor — Liparit Avetisyan
- Best opera actress — Nadezhda Pavlova

=== 2018 ===
- Best opera production — Billy Budd (Bolshoi Theatre)
- Best opera director — Kirill Serebrennikov for Chaadasky, Helikon Opera
- Best opera conductor — Oliver von Dohnányi for the Passenger
- Best ballet — Suite in White (Stanislavski and Nemirovich-Danchenko Theatre)
- Best ballet conductor — Teodor Currentzis for Cinderella (Perm Opera and Ballet Theatre)
- Best drama production (Large) — Fear Love Desperation by Lev Dodin (Maly Drama Theatre)
- Best drama actress — Alla Demidova for Requiem, Poem Without a Hero by Serebrennikov in Gogol Center

=== 2019 ===
- Best ballet — Nureyev by Kirill Serebrennikov (Bolshoi Theatre)
- Best director in drama theatre — Kirill Serebrennikov for Little Tragedies (Gogol Center)
- Best drama production (Large form) — An Optimistic Tragedy by Victor Ryzhakov
- Best actress — Darya Moroz for a role in Three sisters (Moscow Chekhov Art Theatre)
- Best production (Experiment) — Fairyland (Theatre 18+)

=== 2020 ===
- Best production (Large) — Iran Conference by Viktor Ryzhakov (Theatre of Nations)
- Best production (Short) — Crime and Punishment by Konstantin Bogomolov (Comedian's Refuge theatre)
- Best director — Dmitry Krymov for Seryozha (Moscow Chekhov Art Theatre)
- Best actress — Maria Smolnikova for Seryozha (Moscow Chekhov Art Theatre)
- Best playwright — Pavel Pryazhko for The Neighbour (Teatr Post)

=== 2021 ===
- Best Large Form Drama Production — The Tale of the Last Angel by Andrey Moguchy (Moscow's Theatre of Nations)
- Best Small Drama Production — Pinocchio. Theatre by Boris Yukhananov (Electrotheatre Stanislavsky)
- Best director — Youri Boutoussov for Peer Gynt (Moscow Vakhtangov Theatre)
- Best opera director — Dmitri Tcherniakov for Sadko (The Bolshoi Theatre)

=== 2022 ===
- Best drama production (Large) — The Three Fat Men. Episode 7. The Teacher by Andrey Moguchy (Tovstonogov Bolshoi Drama Theater)
- Best drama production (Small) — Comrade Kislyakov by Andrey Kalinin (Alexandrinsky Theatre)
- Best director — Dmitry Krymov for Mozart. Don Juan. The General Rehearsal (Fomenko Workshop Theatre)
- Best playwright — Svetlana Petriychuk for Finist the Brave Falcon
- Best actor — Yevgeny Tsyganov for Mozart. Don Juan. The General Rehearsal (Fomenko Workshop Theatre)
- Jury Special Prize — Gorbachyov with Chulpan Khamatova and Yevgeny Mironov (Theatre of Nations)

=== 2023 ===
- Best director — Lev Dodin for The Seagull (Maly Drama Theatre)
- Best drama production (Large) — Farid Bikchantiev for Muhajirs (Galiaskar Kamal Tatar Academic Theatre)
- Best drama production (Small) — General and his family by Svetlana Zemlyakova (Moscow Vakhtangov Theatre)
- Best actress — Ilona Markarova for Ratcatcher (Di Capua Theatre)
- Best actor — Alan Albegov for King Lear (Thapsaev Theatre)

=== 2024–2025 ===
- Best drama production (Large) — Irina Lychagina for To Love in War (Hvorostovsky Krasnoyarsk Opera and Ballet Theatre)
- Best drama production (Small) — Dreamer and His Friends by Krasnoyarsk Opera and Ballet Theatre
- Best actress — Lyudmila Maksakova for Ratcatcher (Di Capua Theatre)
- Best actor — Victor Swank for Pro et Contra (Eifman Ballet)
