= Theatre 18+ =

Non-state theatre in Rostov-on-Don, Russia

- Театр "18+"
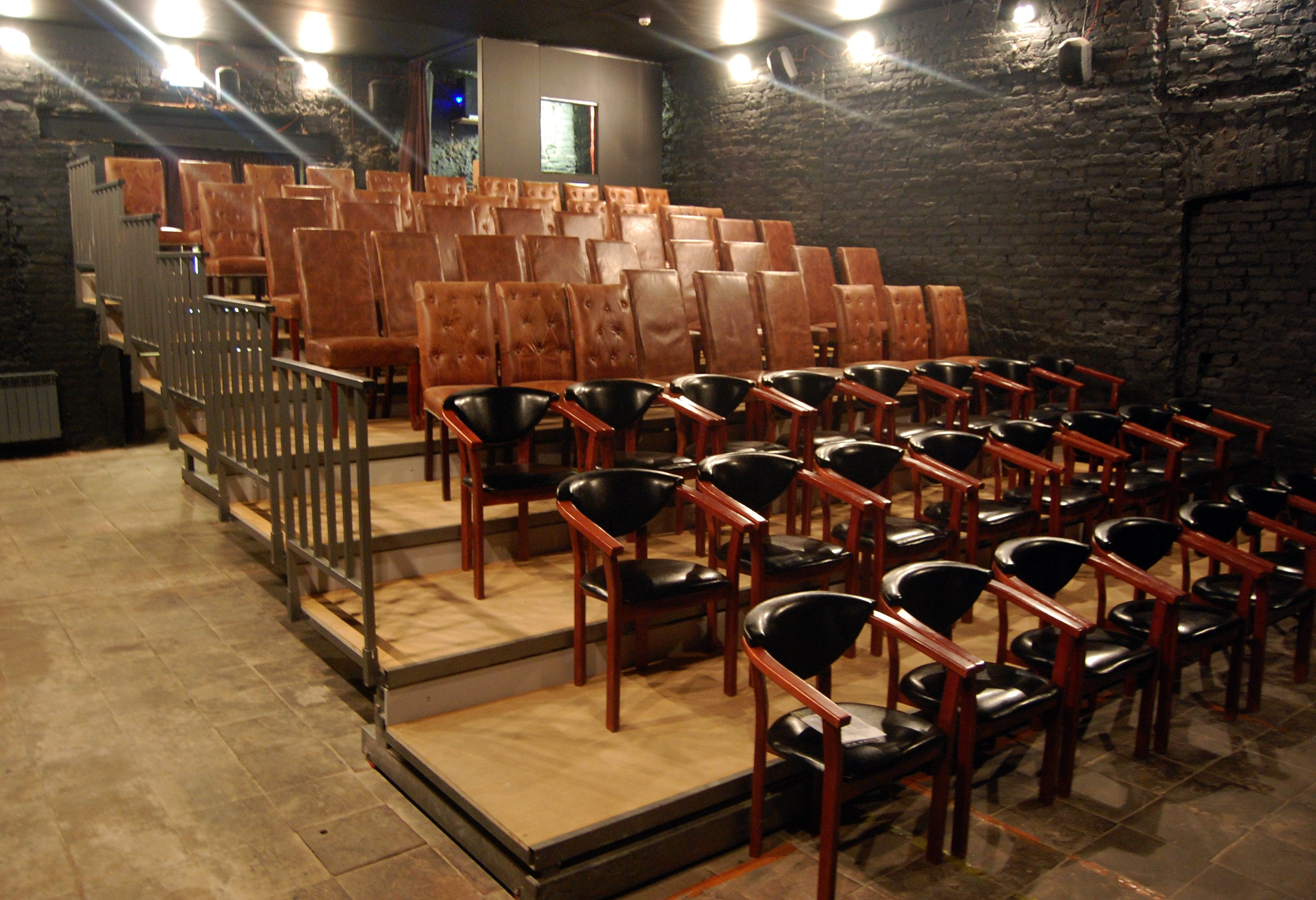
- Address: Rostov-on-Don; Russia

Construction
- Opened: 2013

Website
- teatr18.ru

Theatre 18+ is a non-state theatre opened in Rostov-on-Don in January 2013.

== History of the theatre ==
The creation of the theatre on the territory of the former pasta factory was first announced in August 2012. Initially, the opening of the theatre, the founders of which were the Gallery 16thLINE and Minicult, was scheduled for November 2012. It was immediately noted that the Theatre18+ intends to focus on modern drama, with which traditional theatres do not dare to work. Yuri Muravitsky was declared the artistic director of theatre, the chief director was Olga Kalashnikova. The opening of the theatre was planned for January 31, 2013 at the same time as the opening of the cultural site MAKARONKA. It was also announced a comedy A Secret project "Bugs 64 " by Sergei Medvedev.

In the renovated territory of the former pasta factory a theater auditorium with 80 seats and exhibition grounds were placed. The total exhibition area exceeds one thousand square metres. Originally, theatre did not plan to acquire their own troupe, as each project was expected to gather the appropriate cast. Nowadays the artistic director of Theatre18+ is Yuri Muravitsky, the main director of the theatre since 2015 is Herman Grekov.

In September 2013, the theatre joined the program Theatre+society, during which Rostov students aged 9 to 16 years under the direction of Yuri Muravitsky and Olga Kalashnikova wrote seven plays for the theatre. In November 2015, the performance Sonosopher became the participant of the VI International festival of chamber theatres and performances of small forms ArtOkraine (St.-Petersburg)^{[10]}.

== Repertoire ==
- 2013 – Dad (dir. Yu Muravitsky, drum. L. Mulmenko, S. Medvedev, M. Zelinskaya)
- 2013 – As Alive (dir. O. Kalashnikova, drama. M. Zelinskaya)
- 2013 – The Cat is Guilty in My Sexuality (dir. Oh. Nevmerzhitskaya, drum. A. Donatova)
- 2013 – Girls (dir. O. Kalashnikova, drama. V. Levanov, premiere – 2012)
- 2013 – Toad (dir. Ruslan Malikov, drum. S. Medvedev)
- 2013 – The Incredible Adventures of Julia and Natasha (dir. and drama. – Yu. Muravitsky, G. Grekov)
- 2014 – Session (dir. O. Zibrova, libretto – S. Medvedev)
- 2014 – Still Ahead (dir. O. Kalashnikov)
- 2014 – Casting (dir. Mr. Greeks, drum. G. the Greeks and Yuri Muravitsky)
- 2015 – Love, Dream and Bigudi (dir. O. Zibrov, AMD. A. Donatova)
- 2016 – Sasha, Take out the Garbage (dir. O. Zibrov, AMD. N. Vorozhbit)
- 2017 – Wonderland (dir. V. Lisovsky)[24][25]
- 2017 – Production of Delirium (dir. E. Matveev, drum. P. Pryazhko)
- 2017 – Khanana (dir. Yu Muravitsky, drum. G. Greeks)
- 2017 – Black Caviar (dir. O. Zibrov, AMD. S. Medvedev)
- 2018 – Chronicles of Macbeth. Kings of the Porch (dir. Mr. Greeks, drum. M. Volokhov)

== Quotes ==
- "Moskvich Muravitsky subscribed to the Rostov history, of course, not only because the town is cute, don't want instagram . For him it is more important that the theatre is a non – governmental and doesn't have to be answerable to anyone for the artistic part. More exactly, there is investor Samoylov, but he is a living, concrete person, here – another form of accountability and other criteria. They can be discussed, they are above the law. And the second thing: "18+" is a startup and it's not someone's ready turret with history" — Lyubov Mulmenko, 2013.
