= Oleg Postnov =

Russian author (born 1962)

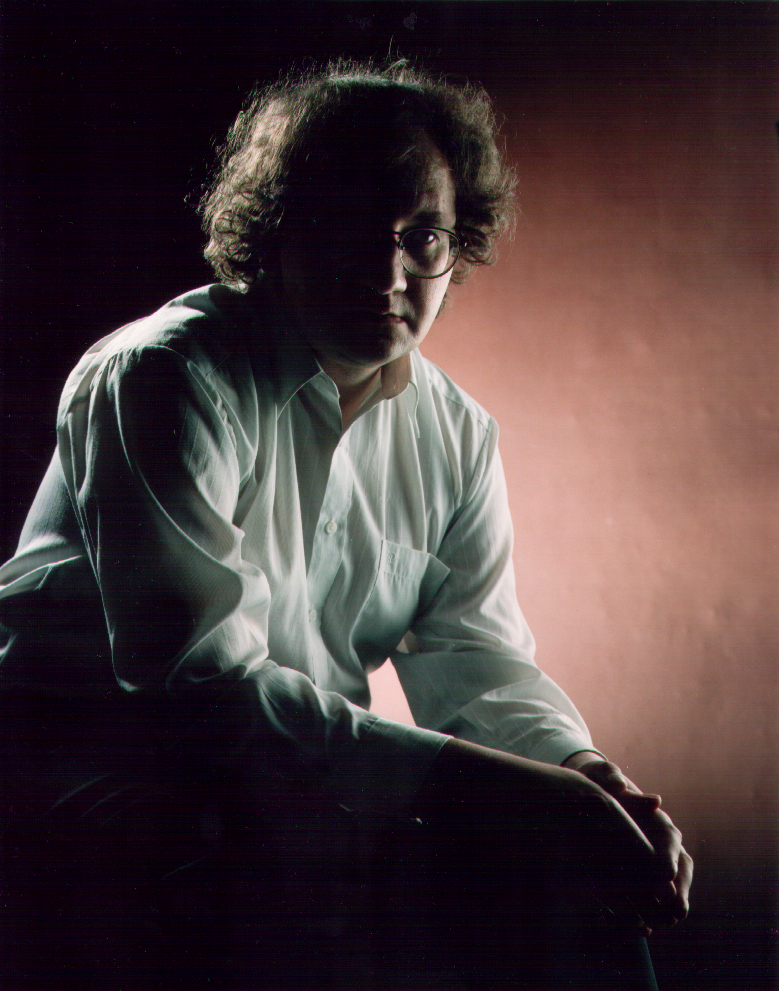
- Citizenship: Russia
- Education: PhD
- Alma mater: Novosibirsk State University
- Occupation: Writer
- Children: Nikita Postnov
- Writing career
- Language: Russian, German, Hungarian
- Period: 1990-present
- Notable awards: Veteran of Russian Academy of Science (Siberian Branch); Silver Sigma

Oleg Georgievitch Postnov (Russian: Олег Постнов; born 1962, Novosibirsk, USSR) is a Russian author.

Postnov is a novelist most recognized for his fiction about love. The critics have described Postnov's work as an amalgamation of the Russian's classics: "as if Vladimir Nabokov took on a rewrite of Gogol's Evenings on a Farm Near Dikanka"—with the added "macabre of Edgar Allan Poe." Postnov's novel Angst has been translated into German.

== Early years and education ==
Oleg Postnov was born in Russian Akademgorodok. He graduated from the Novosibirsk State University, the Humanities Division, in 1986. In 1990, he received his PhD.

== Family ==
Oleg Postnov lives in Akademgorodok, Novosibirsk, Russia with his son Nikita.

== Writing career ==
The Sand Timer (Russian: Песочное время) (Novosibirsk, 1997) Postnov published his first work of fiction—a short story "The Sand Timer"—in 1997. The Sand Timer received the distinction of Matador Magazine's prestigious "top ten books 1998."

Angst (Russian: Страх) (Amfora 2001) is an "erotic mysticism novel with a detective plot". In Russia, Postnov's Angst took the first prize in the "Catch of 1999" and was nominated for the Russian Booker Prize of 2002; for the National Bestseller Prize, shortlisted for the Apollon Grigoriev Prize In Germany, Die Berliner Literaturktitik compared the book to Nabokov's Lolita and called Postnov a "magician."

The Antiquary (Russian: Антиквар) (Lenizdat 2013)

- To Kiss the Harlequin (Russian: Поцелуй арлекина)(EKSMO2006). Chapters of Harlequin appeared in 2001 in Dmitry Kuzmin's "New Literary Card of Russia" (Russian: Новая литературная карта России).
- Mirgorod (Russian: МИРГОРОД) (Azbuka, 2013)
- The Girl That Ran on Ice (Russian: ДЕВОЧКА НА КОНЬКАХ) (Azbuka, 2014)

== Academic career and awards ==
Silver Sigma

Oleg Postnov's doctorate explores classic Russian literature of the first third of the 19th century.

Between 1986 and 2007, Postnov worked as senior scientist for the Institute of Philology Academy of Sciences (Siberian Branch). He is a recipient of the medal of the Russian Academy of Sciences (Siberian Branch) and a Silver Sigma.

Postnov has published a number of scholarly books and articles.

=== Scholarly books ===
- Esthetics of Goncharov
- Pushkin and Death
- Death in Russia X-XX century

=== Scholarly articles ===
- Pushkin and Grin (the crossroads of one anthroponym) (Moscow 2003)
- Bryus and the Russian Literary Tradition of the 20th Century (Петербург 2004)
- Russian Military Epitaph, 18th - Early 19th Century (Petersburg 2006)
- Truth in Literary Text (Novosibirsk 2006)
- The Individual and the Tradition in the Modern World (Novosibirsk 2007)
- Sysoev's Paradox (Moscow, 2009)

== Television and theater ==
In 2011, The Moscow Theater of Nations opened its production of Albert Camus's Caligula in translation of Oleg Postnov and E.A. Gorny. In 2012, the production received the most prestigious award in the Russian Federation theater—the Golden Mask. TV channel Moskva 24 reported that "The ever-busy Muscovites not only find the time to watch this four-hour-long play," but even form long lines to buy the expensive tickets.

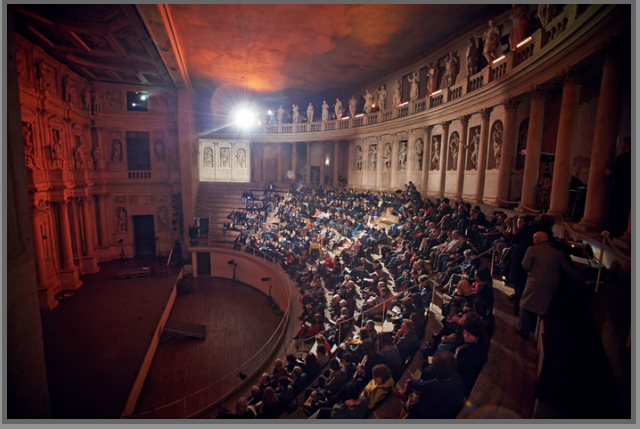
Caligula performance, Theater of Nations, tour in Vicenza, Italy

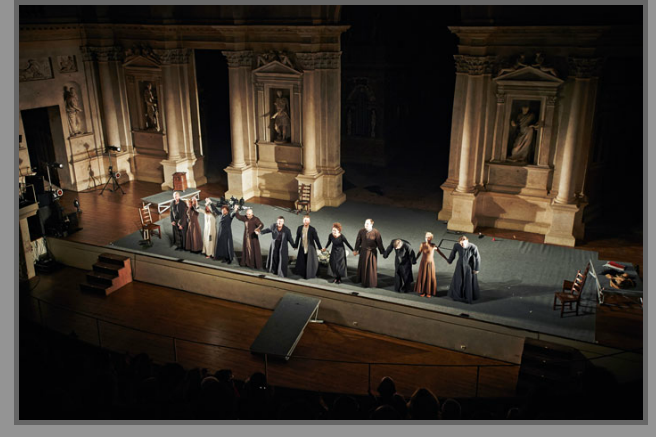
Caligula performance, Theater of Nations, tour in Vicenza, Italy

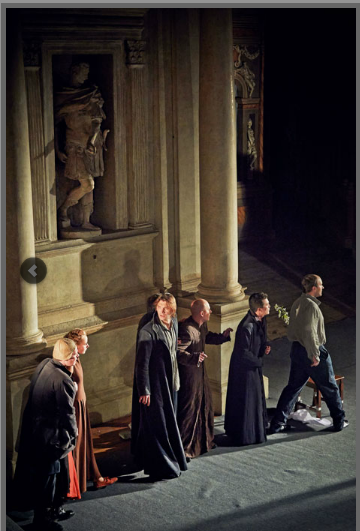
Tour of Theater of Nations, Italy, performance of Caligula

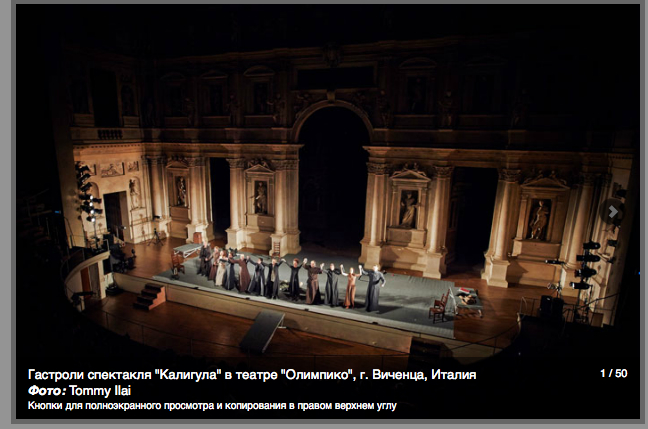
Tour of Theater of Nations, Italy, performance of Caligula

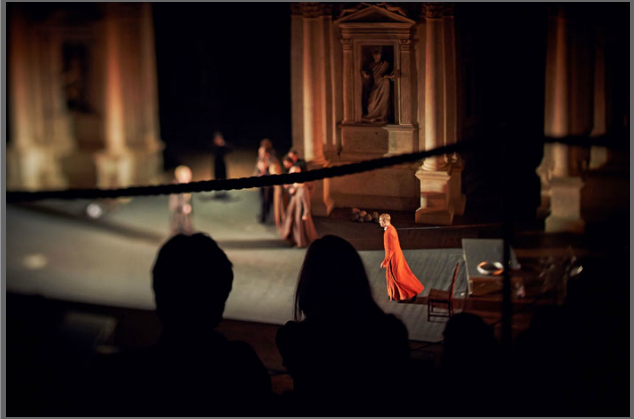
Theater of Nations, the tour of Caligula in the Theatre Olimpico, Vicenza, Italy

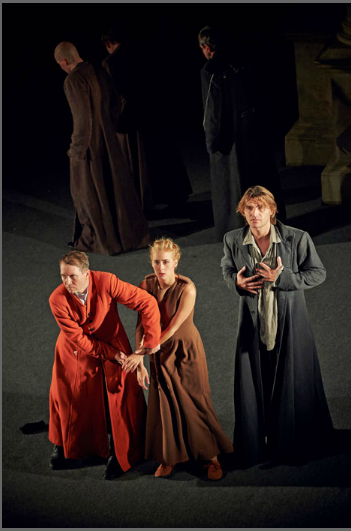
Theater of Nations, the tour of Caligula in the Theatre Olimpico, Vicenza, Italy

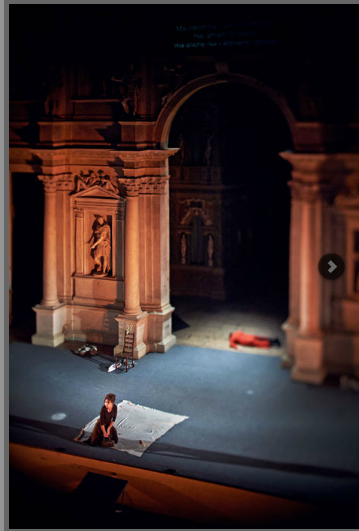
Theater of Nations, the tour of Caligula in the Theatre Olimpico, Vicenza, Italy

Postnov’s contribution to the theater, —in addition to his translation of Camu’s Caligula, include an original play called Ernst, Theodor, Amadeus. Postnov’s fairy-tale-like play explores the last year and death of the German Romantic and storyteller best known as E.T.A. Hoffmann (the author of The Nutcracker).
