= Nadine Koutcher =

Belarusian opera singer (born 1983)

- Надзея Кучар
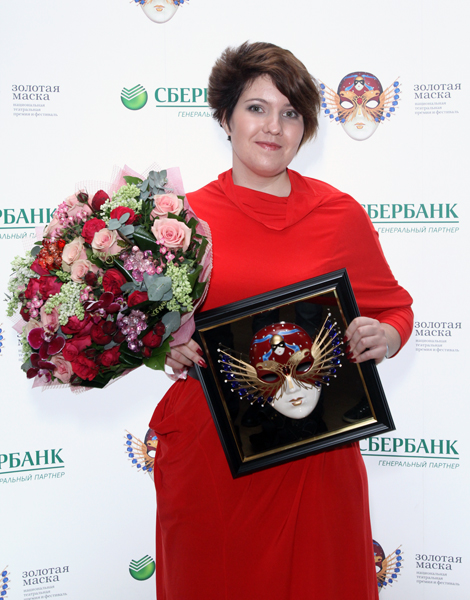
- Koutcher in 2013
- Born: 18 May 1983 (age 42); Minsk, Belarusian SSR, Soviet Union
- Education: Minsk State Musical College; St Petersburg Conservatory
- Occupation: Opera singer (soprano)
- Website: https://nadinekoutcher.com

Nadine Koutcher (Belarusian: Надзея Анатолеўна Кучар, romanized: Nadzeya Anatoleuna Kuchar, born 18 May 1983) is a Belarusian opera singer. A dramatic coloratura soprano, she was the winner of the 2015 BBC Cardiff Singer of the World competition.

== Life ==
Koutcher was born in Minsk in 1983. In 2003 she graduated from Minsk State Musical College, the Department of Musical Theory.

In 2006 she won the 1st prize in the vocal contest of the Religious Music Festival «Mahutny Bozha». In 2007 she won 1st prize in two International competitions: Bibigul Tulegenova's Contest in Kazakhstan and Irina Bogacheva's Contest in St. Petersburg. Also in 2007 she had opera debut in the Opera and Ballet Theatre of St. Petersburg Conservatory, she sang Marfa in the opera The Tsar’s Bride by Rimsky-Korsakov. In 2009 she started performing in The Mikhailovsky Theatre in St. Petersburg, her debut role was Violetta in Verdi's La Traviata. In the same theatre she performed other roles for lyrical and coloratura soprano, such as Princess Eudoxie in Galevi's La Juive, Oscar in Verdi's Un ballo in maschera.

In 2011 she graduated from the Saint Petersburg Conservatory with a Vocalist Diploma (the class of a Distinguished Artist, professor Tamara Novichenko, and the chamber class of Kira Izotova).

In August 2011 she won the 1st prize in Mikhailov's Young Opera Singers’ Contest (Cheboksary, Russia).

In 2012 she was invited by Teodor Currentzis to the ensemble of soloists of The Perm State P.I.Tchaikovsky Opera and Ballet Theatre. In May 2012 she took part in the International Diaghilev Festival and was given the role of Medea in the Russian premiere of Pascal Dusapin's opera "Medea Material". For this role, she was awarded the Golden Mask in Moscow in April 2013.

In June 2015 Koutcher became a main prize winner in the competition Cardiff Singer of the World.
