= In the Solitude of Cotton Fields =

1986 play written by Bernard-Marie Koltès

In the Solitude of Cotton Fields (Dans la solitude des champs de coton) is a two-character play by the French dramatist and writer Bernard-Marie Koltès (1948–1989) in 1985.

== Plot ==
The play is performed in one act without intermission. Its two characters are nameless, identified as the Client and the Dealer. The author's instructions do not mention the location and time of day.

The exchanges between the two characters are crafted to avoid specifics and the audience remains unaware of the subject of their negotiations, though it is clear that the stakes are high. They appear to encounter one another by chance when the Dealer approaches the Client with an offer: "Tell me what you want that I can supply, and I will supply it." In the exchanges that follow they at times argumentative, even threatening, and often deliver lengthy monologues to one another. The conversation is intense, includes "animal imagery and oblique, hostile warnings", and has been described as "high-octane, sexually charged".

The audience, in the words of one critic, is invited to consider: "Who are these characters with their talk of light and darkness, life and death, goodness and evil, peace and war? Are they individuals, social classes, races, nations? Is the deal life itself and the Client's walk life's journey? Is the Dealer's offer not sex or illicit substances but the promise and peril of human existence, a transaction that carries with it an inescapable conclusion?"

== Performance and reception ==
The play premiered in January 1987 at the Théâtre Nanterre-Amandiers. It was presented on television in 1999 and that version was released on video in 1999.

The play was performed in its original French at the Edinburgh Festival. Writing in The Independent, Paul Taylor said that despite his initial misgivings and prejudices—he anticipated "howling boredom"—he was won over by "a staging of impressive intensity", notably the "palpable magnetism between Pascal Greggory's tall, shaven-headed, vehemently fastidious Client and Patrice Chereau's smaller, dishevelled, professionally pleading Dealer" and the "formal stateliness and a verbal elaboration" at odds with the setting. The audience was sent an English translation weeks before the performances and the staging, recognized as "potentially the riskiest Festival venture", was a "stunning success" with audiences.

The play toured the UK in a production by the Actors Touring Company. In The Guardian, Michael Billington said it had "a certain visceral power" in the original French but found the English-language production "like a piece of incredibly prolix underground theatre". He thought the play used a style and rhetoric specifically French and best suited to performance in its original language, far removed from traditional British theater.

The play has been performed in an English translation by Jeffrey Wainwright. One New York production used a Polish text with English supertitles.

The play was co-produced in Montreal by two theatre companies, "Sibyllines" and "Creation", from January 23 to February 10, 2018, at the Montreal theatre, Usine C. It was directed by Brigitte Haentjens and starred Hugues Frenette and Sebastien Ricard.

In May 2022 the English translation was staged at the Dailes Theatre in Latvia. Directed by Timofey Kulyabin and starring John Malkovich and Ingeborga Dapkūnaitė, this adaptation changed the regular dynamic of both roles being played by male actors.
