= József Angster =

Hungarian organ builder (1834–1918)

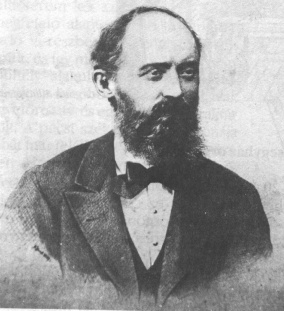
József Angster.

József Angster (7 July 1834 – 9 June 1918) was a Hungarian German organ-making master. He was the founder of the Angster dynasty, one of Central Europe's most sought after in the craft, and an important figure in Hungarian applied arts history.

== Origins ==
Angster was born at Kácsfalu, in present-day Croatia into a Danube Swabians family who had travelled to Hungary from Michelstadt in the 1790s. He wrote his memoirs in German, they were translated in his old age into Hungarian, he later said that in speaking Hungarian he was a beginner, and in writing it he was an unschooled senior.

== Studies ==
He studied cabinet making then travelled to Temesvár (today Timișoara, Romania), and worked in Germany. He studied organ manufacturing in Vienna at the Titz factory and from 1863 to 1866 worked in Paris under Aristide Cavaillé-Coll where he also worked on the organs of Cologny castle, Notre Dame and Sainte-Trinité. He returned home on foot although he was asked to stay and work abroad. He was a deeply religious man and was made member of the Order of St. Gregory the Great by the Pope and was also president of the old boy's club in Pécs until his death.

== Life and work ==
His first domestic commission was for the new Pécs Synagogue and he founded a workshop in that city in 1869. The organ still remains in the synagogue today. In the following decades he received numerous commissions in Hungary and surrounding countries, including Italy. His domestic works include:

- Kalocsa Cathedral.
- Pécs, Inner city R.C. church.
- Budapest, Terézváros (Budapest) R.C. church.
- Pécs Cathedral, built in 1880, it was the 100th organ built by Angster.
- Budapest, Kálvin squ. Reformed church
- Debrecen, Kossuth str. Reformed church
- Győr Cathedral

== Legacy ==
His legacy is the instruments he built. His name is attached to a Technical college in Pécs, where he died, as well as one street in the city. After his death, the organ factory's business was run by Emil and Oszkár Angster after 1903 and from 1940 to 1949 by József Angster, who had been born in 1917. He and his nephew, Imre Angster, established a second factory at Rákospalota and introduced some technical innovations. The Communist takeover resulted in the factory being closed as far as organ manufacturing was concerned. However, since 1992 a new workshop was set up in Pécs with backing by József Angster.

=== Written works ===
- The history and workings of the organ, (Pécs, 1886)

=== Literature ===
- Jozsef Angster (the younger): Angster - a book about the Pécs workshop and family history, Pannonia books, 1993.
- Jozsef Angster obituary, Musical journal/Zenei Szemle, 1918 no. 5

== See also ==
- Judit Angster, great-granddaughter of Angster, physicist of organ acoustics
