= Angst (novel) =

Angst (Russian: Страх) is a 2001 novel by Oleg Postnov. Critics have claimed that Angst builds on the tradition of Pushkin's Queen of Spades, Gogol's Viy, and even on the writings of Jorge Luis Borges. Angst won the first prize in the "Catch of 1999" Russian nationwide competition.

Strah, the German translation 2003

== Plot ==
A story of love of a Russian youth and a Ukrainian beauty is set in the deep Ukrainian country in 1991. Postnov's treatment of the political and ethnographic background of that year became relevant once again in 2014, given the Russian annexation of Crimea.

== Awards and recognitions ==
Postnov's Angst took the first prize in the "Catch of 1999" Russian nationwide competition was nominated for the Russian Booker Prize of 2002; for the National Bestseller Prize; and shortlisted for the prestigious Apollon Grigoriev Prize.

== Critical reception ==
Critics have described Postnov's work as an amalgamation of the Russian's classics—"as if [Vladimir] Nabokov took on a rewrite of Gogol's Evenings on a Farm Near Dikanka—with the added "macabre of Edgar Allan Poe." Critics have claimed that Angst builds on the tradition of Pushkin's Queen of Spades, Gogol's Viy and even on the writings of Jorge Luis Borges. In Germany, where critics took Angst to be Postnov's literary debut, Die Berliner Literaturktitik compared the book to Nabokov's Lolita and called Postnov a "magician."
