= Kristian Smeds =

Finnish playwright and theatre director (born 1970)

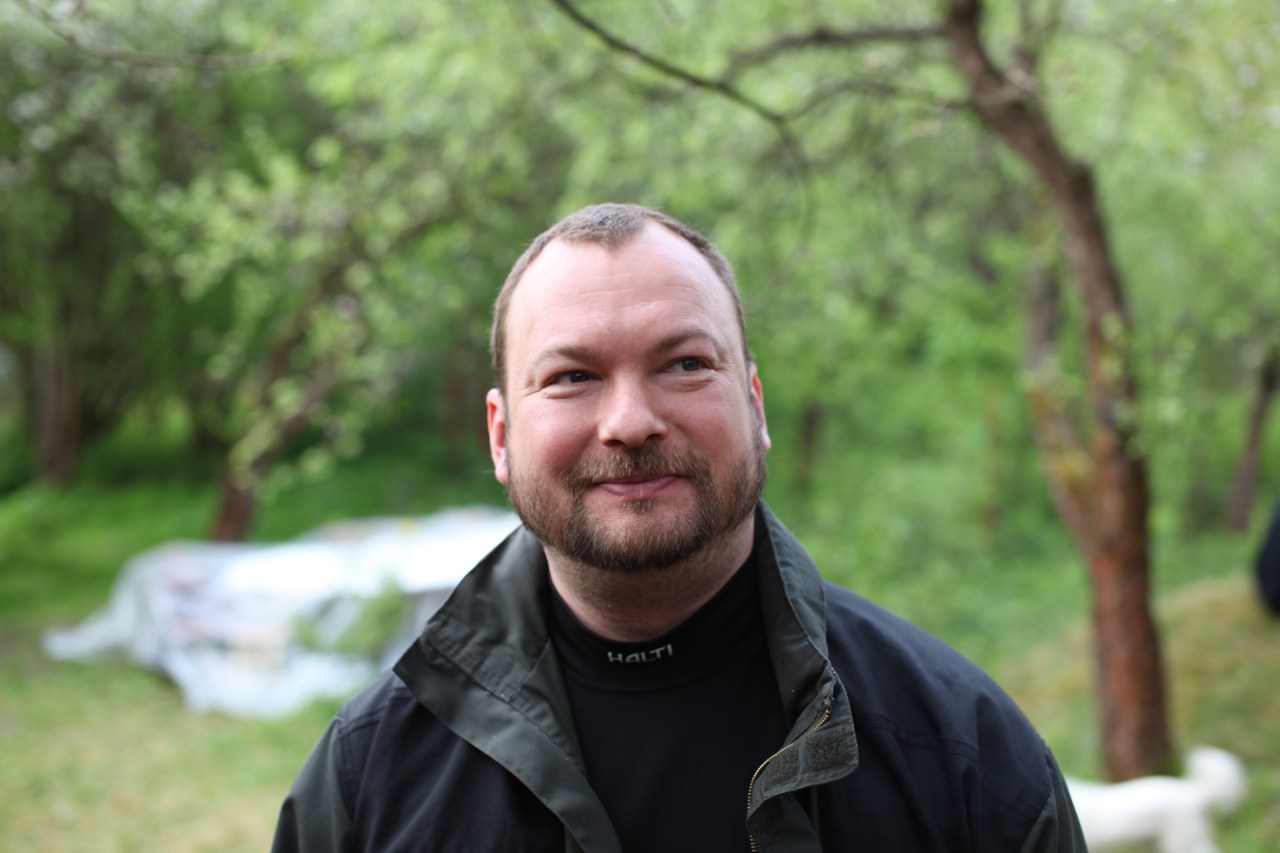
Kristian Smeds, 2009.

Tomi Kristian Smeds (born 1 December 1970) is a Finnish playwright and theatre director. He has worked in Finland, Estonia, Belgium and Lithuania.

In the autumn of 2007, he dramatized and directed an explosive production of Väinö Linna's The Unknown Soldier at the Finnish National Theatre. This re-interpretation of a cherished Finnish novel has been the most controversial theatrical event in Finland, provoking wide acclaim as well as fierce debate. Smeds' stage version was a great success. During 2007–2009 it was performed 122 times with 73,265 tickets sold.

In 2007, Smeds established his own theatre group, Smeds Ensemble, which has partners around Europe. Smeds Ensemble had its first production, Mental Finland, premiered at the Royal Flemish Theatre (KVS) in February 2009. During the same year, the production toured in Finland, Lithuania, France and Austria.

In 2011, Smeds dramatized and directed an adaptation of Paul Auster's novel Mr. Vertigo at the Finnish National Theatre. Same year, Smeds got awarded with the XII Europe Prize Theatrical Realities as a first Scandinavian theatre director.

== Europe Theatre Prize ==
In 2011, he was one of the recipients of the Europe Prize Theatrical Realities, in Saint Petersburg, with the following motivation:

He is a playwright and stage director. Smeds is at home portraying the inner worlds of his characters as in highlighting the remotest corners of society. Smeds’ plays are wild, energetic, and filled with many distinctive voices and can be interpreted in many different ways, and can take full advantage of a wide variety of theatrical techniques. His language is rich and colourful, but at the same time natural. In Smeds’ world, the personal and the political are indistinguishable, and his work is characterized by a deep concern for human beings.
