= Judit Angster =

Hungarian musical acoustics researcher

Judit Angster is a Hungarian physicist specializing in the acoustics of musical organs. She heads a research group in musical acoustics and photoacoustics at the Fraunhofer Institute for Building Physics in Stuttgart, Germany, part of the Fraunhofer-Gesellschaft.

Angster was born in Hungary, the great-granddaughter of Hungarian-German organ builder József Angster. She has a 1991 doctorate (Candidate of Sciences) through the Hungarian Academy of Sciences, and has worked for the Fraunhofer Institute since 1992. She also taught organ-building at the Oscar-Walcker-Schule Ludwigsburg, a German federal college for organ-building in Ludwigsburg, from 1994 to 2003, and has lectured at several other German universities.

Angster was elected as a Fellow of the Acoustical Society of America in 2013, "for contributions to the acoustics of the pipe organ".
