= Randy Angst =

American politician

Randy Angst is an American politician who served in the Missouri House of Representatives, representing District 146 from 2003 to 2004. A member of the Republican Party, Angst was a 2012 candidate for District 129 of the Missouri House of Representatives.

== Personal life ==
Angst graduated from Conway High School in Conway, MO in 1975 and attended Southwest Missouri State University. He and his family live just outside of Lebanon, MO and own and operate Bailey's TV. They are also active members of the First Baptist Church of Lebanon.

== Committees ==
=== 2003-2004 ===
While in the Missouri House of Representatives, Angst served on the following committees:

- Small Business, Vice-Chair
- Homeland Security and Veterans Affairs
- Local Government
- Communications, Energy, and Technology
