= Europe Theatre Prize =

European Commission award

- Awarded for: To a personality in theatre who has promoted "understanding and the exchange of knowledge between peoples"
- Sponsored by: European Commission
- First award: 1987; 39 years ago
- Website: www.premio-europa.org

Europe Prize Theatrical Realities
- Awarded for: Innovation in theatre
- First award: 1990
- Website: http://www.premio-europa.org/

The Europe Theatre Prize (Premio Europa per il Teatro) is an award of the European Commission for a personality who has "contributed to the realisation of cultural events that promote understanding and the exchange of knowledge between peoples". "The winner is chosen for the whole of his artistic path among notable personalities of international theatre considered in all its different forms, articulations and expressions". The prize was established in 1986 when Carlo Ripa di Meana was first commissioner of culture. In those years a contribution to its creation also came from Melina Mercouri, who was patroness of the Prize, and from Jack Lang, then French minister of culture and president of the Prize until 2018. The European Parliament and the European Council have supported it as a "European cultural interest organisation" since 2002.

In 1987 the prize was first awarded to Ariane Mnouchkine for her work with the Théâtre du Soleil. She received a money prize and a sculpture of Pietro Consagra. The first international jury was chaired by Irene Papas. Recipients have included choreographer Pina Bausch and stage director Patrice Chéreau.

In 1990, an additional award Europe Prize Theatrical Realities (Premio Europa Realtà Teatrali) was established looking at innovation in theatre and first awarded to Anatoly Vasiliev. In Edition XII, they were Viliam Dočolomanský (Slovakia), Katie Mitchell (United Kingdom), Andrey Moguchy (Russia), Kristian Smeds (Finland), Teatro Meridional (Portugal) and Vesturport (Iceland). Recipients have also included Heiner Goebbels, Oskaras Koršunovas (2002) and Rimini Protokoll (2008).

The program for both awards is rich in theatrical presentations. Lasting a week, it has been termed the "'Oscars' of European theatre" and "Oscar of Drama".

== History of the Prize ==
The first nine editions of the prize were awarded in Taormina. To achieve a more international aspect it became itinerant, so the ceremonies were held in Turin for Edition X, as part of the cultural program for the 2006 Winter Olympics in collaboration with the Teatro Stabile. Editions XI and XII were held in Thessaloniki, Greece, Edition XIII in Wrocław, Poland, as part of the UNESCO's Grotowski Year.

In 2011 the awards were given at the Alexandrinsky Theatre of Saint Petersburg, then Culture Capital of Russia. A critic described the performances of innovative theatre: "Their shows demonstrate that the dialogue between the arts and cutting edge technology opens up new ways towards creation and knowledge. Computer generated images, pantomime, dancing, circus and music expand the frontiers of the theatre and make it more dramatic. Shows such as Faustus based on Goethe's play, Metamorphosis by Kafka, Mr Vertigo by Paul Auster, Cabo Verde by Natalia Luiza and Miguel Seabra, and Happiness by Maurice Maeternlick are overwhelming both in their use of technique and the emotions they exude."

In 2016, the Edition XV was presented in Craiova, Romania, following the prestigious International Shakespeare Festival, which reached its 10th edition in the 400th anniversary of Shakespeare's death on 23 April. This edition of the Prize was organised under the patronage of the City of Craiova, which wanted to unite the two events, in cooperation with the Shakespeare Foundation and the city's National Theatre ‘Marin Sorescu', to which can be added the contribution of the Romanian Cultural Institute.

In 2017, the Prize returned for the Edition XVI to Italy, in Rome, as a special project promoted by the minister of culture, as both an ideal conclusion to the 60th anniversary of the Treaties of Rome and the opening event of the European Year of Cultural Heritage 2018. These celebrations coincided with the 30th anniversary of the Prize itself, the first cultural initiative launched by the European Community in the field of theatre. The 16th Prize was given to two emblematic figures of the international stage: Isabelle Huppert and Jeremy Irons, artists capable of transferring the theatrical dimension to that of cinema and vice-versa so that the Prize went once again to actors, after Michel Piccoli's 2001 award of the 9th Prize. The ceremony finished with a staged reading of Harold Pinter's Ashes to Ashes, masterfully performed by Huppert and Irons, who have been defined by The Guardian 'theatrical dynamite'.

In November 2018, the Europe Theatre Prize returned for the second time to St. Petersburg, Russia, thanks to the support and patronage of the Ministry of Culture of the Russian Federation and the City Government, and was included in the VII "St. Petersburg International Cultural Forum" as a flagship event among theatrical events. The Baltic House Theatre-Festival of St. Petersburg presented the Edition XVII of the Prize, collaborated in the realization of the event, supported and organized it in Russia, as well as hosting various scheduled performances. With its return to Russia as part of the VII Cultural Forum, the Prize once again served as a bridge that uses theatre and art to connect and encourage dialogue across geographical, cultural, political and social differences.

== List of recipients ==
List of recipients of the Europe Theatre Prize
| Edition | Year | Artist | Special Prize |
|---|---|---|---|
| I | 1987 | Ariane Mnouchkine and the Théâtre du Soleil [France] | Melina Merkourī [Greece] |
| II | 1989 | Peter Brook [United Kingdom/France] | |
| III | 1990 | Giorgio Strehler [Italy] | |
| IV | 1994 | Heiner Müller [Germany] | |
| V | 1997 | Robert Wilson [United States] | |
| VI | 1998 | Luca Ronconi [Italy] | Václav Havel [Czech Republic] |
| VII | 1999 | Pina Bausch [Germany] | |
| VIII | 2000 | Lev Dodin [Russia] | BITEF (Jovan Ćirilov) [Serbia]; Ibrahim Spahić [Bosnia and Herzegovina] (Special Mention) |
| IX | 2001 | Michel Piccoli [France] | |
| X | 2006 | Harold Pinter [United Kingdom] | |
| XI | 2007 | Robert Lepage [Canada] and Peter Zadek [Germany] | |
| XII | 2008 | Patrice Chéreau [France] | |
| XIII | 2009 | Krystian Lupa [Poland] | |
| XIV | 2011 | Peter Stein [Germany] | Yuri Lyubimov [Russia] |
| XV | 2016 | Mats Ek [Sweden] | Silviu Purcarete [Romania] |
| XVI | 2017 | Isabelle Huppert [France], Jeremy Irons [United Kingdom] | Wole Soyinka [Nigeria]; Fadhel Jaïbi [Tunisia] (Special Mention) |
| XVII | 2018 | Valery Fokin [Russia] | Núria Espert [Spain] |

List of recipients of the Europe Prize Theatrical Realities
| Edition | Year | Artist | Special Prize |
|---|---|---|---|
| I | 1990 | Anatoly Vasiliev [Soviet Union] | |
| II | 1994 | Giorgio Barberio Corsetti [Italy], Els Comediants [Spain], Eimuntas Nekrošius [Lithuania] | |
| III | 1997 | Carte Blanche - Compagnia della Fortezza (Armando Punzo) [Italy], Théâtre de Complicité (Simon McBurney) [United Kingdom] | |
| IV | 1998 | Christoph Marthaler [Switzerland] | |
| V | 1999 | Royal Court Theatre (Sarah Kane, Mark Ravenhill, Jez Butterworth, Conor McPherson, Martin McDonagh) [United Kingdom] | |
| VI | 2000 | Theatergroep Hollandia (Johan Simons, Paul Koek) [Netherlands], Thomas Ostermeier [Germany], Societas Raffaello Sanzio (Romeo Castellucci, Chiara Guidi) [Italy] | |
| VII | 2001 | Heiner Goebbels [Germany], Alain Platel [Belgium] | |
| VIII | 2006 | Oskaras Koršunovas [Lithuania], Josef Nadj [Serbia/Hungary] | |
| IX | 2007 | Alvis Hermanis [Latvia], Biljana Srbljanović [Serbia] | |
| X | 2008 | Rimini Protokoll (Helgard Haug, Stefan Kaegi, Daniel Wetzel) [Germany/Switzerland], Sasha Waltz [Germany], Krzysztof Warlikowski [Poland] | Belarus Free Theatre [Belarus] (Special Mention) |
| XI | 2009 | Guy Cassiers [Belgium], Pippo Delbono [Italy], Rodrigo García [Argentina/Spain], Árpád Schilling [Hungary], François Tanguy and the Théâtre du Radeau [France] | |
| XII | 2011 | Viliam Dočolomanský [Slovakia/Czech Republic], Katie Mitchell [United Kingdom], Andrey Moguchy [Russia], Kristian Smeds [Finland], Teatro Meridional [Portugal], Vesturport Theatre [Iceland] | |
| XIII | 2016 | Viktor Bodó [Hungary], Andreas Kriegenburg [Germany], Juan Mayorga [Spain], National Theatre of Scotland [United Kingdom], Joël Pommerat [France] | |
| XIV | 2017 | Susanne Kennedy [Germany], Jernej Lorenci [Slovenia], Yael Ronen [Israel], Alessandro Sciarroni [Italy], Kirill Serebrennikov [Russia], Theatre NO99 [Estonia] | Dimitris Papaioannou [Greece] |
| XV | 2018 | Sidi Larbi Cherkaoui [Belgium/Morocco], Cirkus Cirkör (Tilde Björfors) [Sweden], Julien Gosselin [France], Jan Klata [Poland], Milo Rau [Switzerland], Tiago Rodrigues [Portugal] | |

== Publications ==
In addition to the publication of a catalogue for every Prize edition, a series of volumes hosts the proceedings of meetings of the various editions with testimonies on the profiles and works of the winners and the proceedings of the collateral initiatives of the Prize events.

== Sources ==
- http://www.premio-europa.org/etp2018/index.html
