= Nina Katerli =

Soviet and Russian writer, publicist and activist (1934–2023)

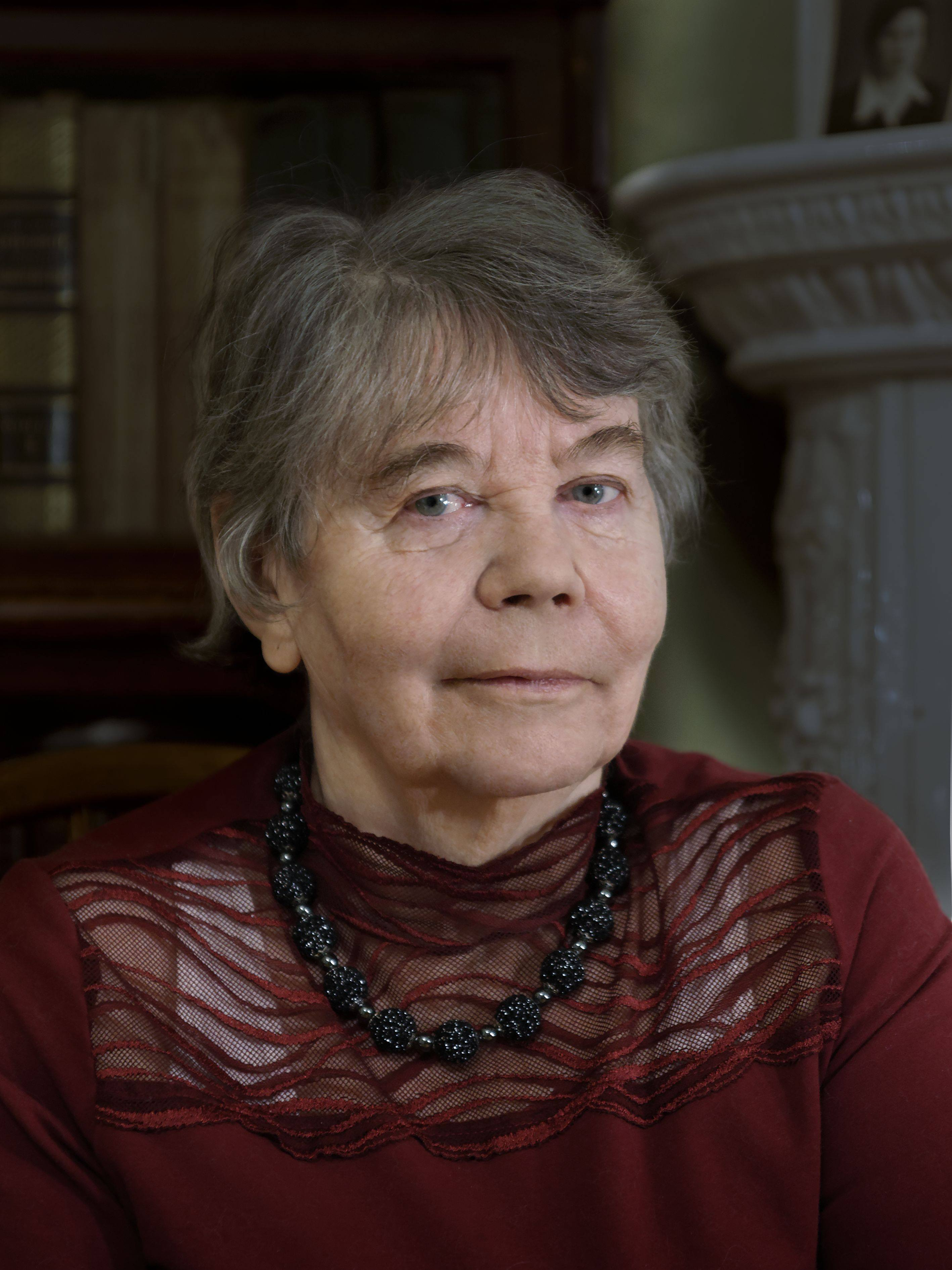
Katerli in 2011

Nina Katerli (Ни́на Семёновна Кате́рли (Nina Semenovna Katerli), 30 June 1934 – 20 November 2023) was a Russian writer, publicist, and human rights activist.

== Biography ==
Katerli was born on 30 June 1934, in Leningrad into a family of writers. Her mother, Elena Iosifovna Katerli (real name Kondakova, 1902–1958), was a prose writer and journalist. Her father, Solomon Shmulevich (Semyon Samoilovich) Farfel (pseudonym "F. Samoilov", 1907–1985), was a documentary writer, a participant in the Great Patriotic War, lieutenant colonel, military correspondent for the newspaper On Guard of the Motherland of the Leningrad Front, holder of the Order of the Red Star. Her grandfather, Samuil Grigorievich Farfel (1877–1927), was a journalist employee of the cadet newspaper Rech.

In 1958 she graduated from the Technological Institute. She worked as a chemical technologist at a research institute until 1976, after which she left engineering. Later, Katerli wrote 15 books of prose and journalism. Some of her works have been translated into foreign languages and published abroad in the US, France, Germany, Japan, China, Hungary, the Czech Republic and other countries.

Laureate of the PEN Club of St. Petersburg award “For civic and creative courage” (1996) and the House of Book and PEN Club of St. Petersburg awarded “Honor and Freedom” in the nomination “Publicism” for the book Claim (1999).

Katerli lived in St. Petersburg. She died on 20 November 2023, aged 90.

== Creation ==
N. Katerli wrote her first stories in the early seventies, starting with feuilletons that were published in the newspaper Evening Leningrad, and stories about her wartime childhood published in the magazine Koster (the first publication was 1973, the story “Welcome”).

Katerli was one of the first, along with Alexander Zhitinsky, to perform in the genre of fantastic realism. In 1976, Nina Katerli's first three science fiction stories were published in Neva magazine: “Nagornaya, Ten,” “Unrequited Love,” and “Okho-Kho.”

The first book, a collection of short stories called “Window”, was published in 1981 by the Leningrad publishing house “Soviet Writer”.

In the same year, N. Katerli's story “Barsukov’s Triangle” was published in the American almanac Verb. In the early 1980s, another of her stories, “Chervets,” was distributed in samizdat, which depicts in a semi-fantastic form the existence of the Soviet research institute and touches on the Jewish question, which was forbidden at that time. This led to problems for the author, including a “conversation” with KGB officer Pavel Koshelev. This story is described in the story “Second Life,” included in the book of memoirs “What We Were Witnesses.”

In 1990, a short hand-drawn animated film titled "The Monster," inspired by Nina Katerli's extraordinary story, was produced at the Sverdlovsktelefilm studio. The film was directed by the artist E. Nitylkina.

During the 1990s, Nina Katerli transitioned to writing psychological prose, penning narratives like "Heat in the North", "Kursaal", "Red Hat", "Diary of a Broken Doll", among others in this style. Concurrently, she continued to produce works in the fantastic realism and social satire genres. Entering the 2000s, Katerli crafted a series of satirical fairy tales about the "Best City" and the fantastical tale “The Tale of the Gromushkins”. These were later included in her compilation "The Magic Lamp", released by Helikon Plus publishing house in 2009.

In 2014, the Helikon Plus publishing house published the book “The Poor Land.” The new collection includes prose written in the seventies and eighties: three stories: “Barsukov’s Triangle”, “Chervets” and “Kostylev”, as well as several short stories. The story “Kostylev”, written in 1983, had not been published.

== Activities ==
Katerli wrote and published dozens of newspaper articles devoted to the struggle for human rights, the Nazi threat in Russia, and social and cultural problems.

Katerli's human rights activities are the subject of her documentary books “The Lawsuit” and “The Nikitin Case. Strategy for Victory,” as well as a collection of journalistic articles from 1988 to 2010. The book Claim is dedicated to the two-year trial brought by Alexander Romanenko, the author of the book On the Class Essence of Zionism (L., 1976), whom Katerly accused of anti-Semitism and Nazism. The reason for the lawsuit was Katerli's article “The Road to Monuments,” published on October 9, 1988, in the Leningradskaya Pravda newspaper. The process ended in 1990 with Romanenko's refusal to sue.

Her book “The Nikitin Case. Strategy for Victory" was co-written with an ecologist Alexander Nikitin.

Nina Katerli continued her membership in the St. Petersburg PEN Club, the Free Word Association, and the Human Rights Council of St. Petersburg until her death.

== Books ==
- Н. Катерли (1981). Окно, сборник рассказов. Ленинград: Советский писатель.
- Н. Катерли (1986). Цветные открытки, рассказы и повести. Ленинград: Советский писатель.
- Н. Катерли (1990). Курзал, рассказы и повести. Ленинград: Советский писатель.
- Н. Катерли (1992). Сенная площадь, рассказы и повести. Санкт-Петербург: Позисофт.
- Н. Катерли (1998). Иск, документальная повесть. Самара: Самарский издательский дом.
- Н. Катерли (2000). Тот свет, повести. Санкт-Петербург: Нева, Олма-Пресс.
- Н. Катерли (2001). Красная шляпа,повести. Москва: АСТ.
- Н. Катерли (2001). Рукою мастера, сборник рассказов. Санкт-Петербург: журнал "Звезда".
- Н. Катерли, А. Никитин (2001). Дело Никитина. Санкт-Петербург: журнал "Звезда".
- Н. Катерли (2003). Дневник сломанной куклы. Санкт-Петербург: Азбука.
- Н. Катерли (2006). Дневник сломанной куклы. Москва: АСТ.
- Н. Катерли, Л. Миклашевская (2007). Чему свидетели мы были. Женские судьбы. XX век. Санкт-Петербург: журнал "Звезда".
- Н. Катерли (2009). Волшебная лампа, сборник рассказов. Санкт-Петербург: Геликон Плюс.
- Н. Катерли (2010). Делай, что должно, и будь, что будет, сборник статей. Санкт-Петербург: Нестор-История.
- Н. Катерли (2014). Земля бедованная, рассказы и повести. Санкт-Петербург: Геликон Плюс.
