= Frida Vigdorova =

Soviet writer (1915–1965)

Frida Abramovna Vigdorova (16 March 1915, Orsha – 7 August 1965) was a Soviet journalist, novelist and writer. She is mostly known for her record of the trial of poet Joseph Brodsky in 1964.

== Biography ==
Vigdorova graduated from Moscow Pedagogic Institute. She was the author of a number of books on issues in education, including Diary of a Russian Schoolteacher (1954). She worked as a correspondent for Literaturnaya Gazeta.

In 1964, Vigdorova took notes during the trial of poet Joseph Brodsky, convicted for "social parasitism". Compiled without censorship, Frida Vigdorova's account circulated in samizdat and made its way to the West.
