= Jules Angst =

Swiss academic (1926–2026)

- Born: 11 December 1926; Zurich, Switzerland
- Died: 15 May 2026 (aged 99)
- Citizenship: Switzerland
- Education: University of Zurich
- Awards: Anna Monika Awards (1967/1969), Paul Martini Prize for Methodology in Medicine (1969), Otto Naegeli Prize (1983), Eric Stromgren Medal (1987), the Emil Kraepelin Medal of the Max Planck Institute, Munich (1992); Selo Prize NARSAD/Depression Research, USA (1994), Mogens Schou Award for Research in Bipolar Disorder, USA (2001), Burgholzli Award for Social Psychiatry (2001), Lifetime Achievement Award of the International Society of Psychiatric Genetics (2002), Lifetime Achievement Award (European Bipolar Forum), Wagner-Jauregg Medal (2007), ECNP Lifetime Achievement Award in Neuro-psychopharmacology (2012), Lifetime Achievement Award of the American Foundation for Suicide Prevention (2013), Joseph Zubin Award (APPA)(2015), Jean Delay Prize of the WPA (2017), Wilhelm Griesinger Medal of the DGPPN (German Association for Psychiatry, Psychotherapy and Psychosomatics) (2018)
- Scientific career
- Fields: Psychiatry

Jules Angst (11 December 1926 – 15 May 2026) was a Swiss academic who was a Professor of Psychiatry at Zurich University in Zurich, Switzerland, and Honorary Doctor of Heidelberg University in Heidelberg, Germany.

== Life and career ==
Angst was born on 11 December 1926 in Zurich, where he also grew up. He completed his medical and psychiatric training in Zurich under his mentor, Professor Manfred Bleuler (son and student of Eugen Bleuler). From 1969 to 1994, Jules Angst was Professor of Clinical Psychiatry in the University of Zurich Medical School and Head of the Research Department of Zurich University Psychiatric Hospital (the Burghölzli).

He continued uninterrupted his epidemiological and clinical research at the University (Universitätsklinik) since leaving his Chair. He has remained the President of the European Bipolar Forum since 2003.

His scientific contributions include 15 books (as author and/or editor), 154 book chapters, and 539 journal articles.

Angst died on 15 May 2026, at the age of 99.

== Awards ==
Jules Angst received many awards in recognition of his work, including the Anna Monika Awards (1967/1969), Paul Martini Prize for Methodology in Medicine (1969), Otto Naegeli Prize (1983), Eric Stromgren Medal (1987), the Emil Kraepelin Medal of the Max Planck Institute, Munich (1992), the Jean Delay Prize of the World Psychiatric Association (2017), and the Wilhelm Griesinger Medal of the DGPPN (German Association for Psychiatry, Psychotherapy and Psychosomatics (2018).

Other awards include the Selo Prize NARSAD/Depression Research, USA (1994), Mogens Schou Award for Research in Bipolar Disorder, USA (2001), Burgholzli Award for Social Psychiatry (2001), the Lifetime Achievement Award of the International Society of Psychiatric Genetics (2002), Lifetime Achievement Award of the European Bipolar Forum (2006), the Wagner-Jauregg Medal (2007), ECNP Lifetime Achievement Award in Neuropsychopharmacology (2012), Lifetime Achievement Award of the American Foundation for Suicide Prevention (2013), and the Joseph Zubin Award of the American Psychopathological Association (2015). In 1999, he was named Honorary Member of the European College of Neuropsychopharmacology (ECNP).
