= Makaronka =

Art center in Russia

Coordinates: 47°18′22″N 39°42′11″E

- Макаронка (Russian)
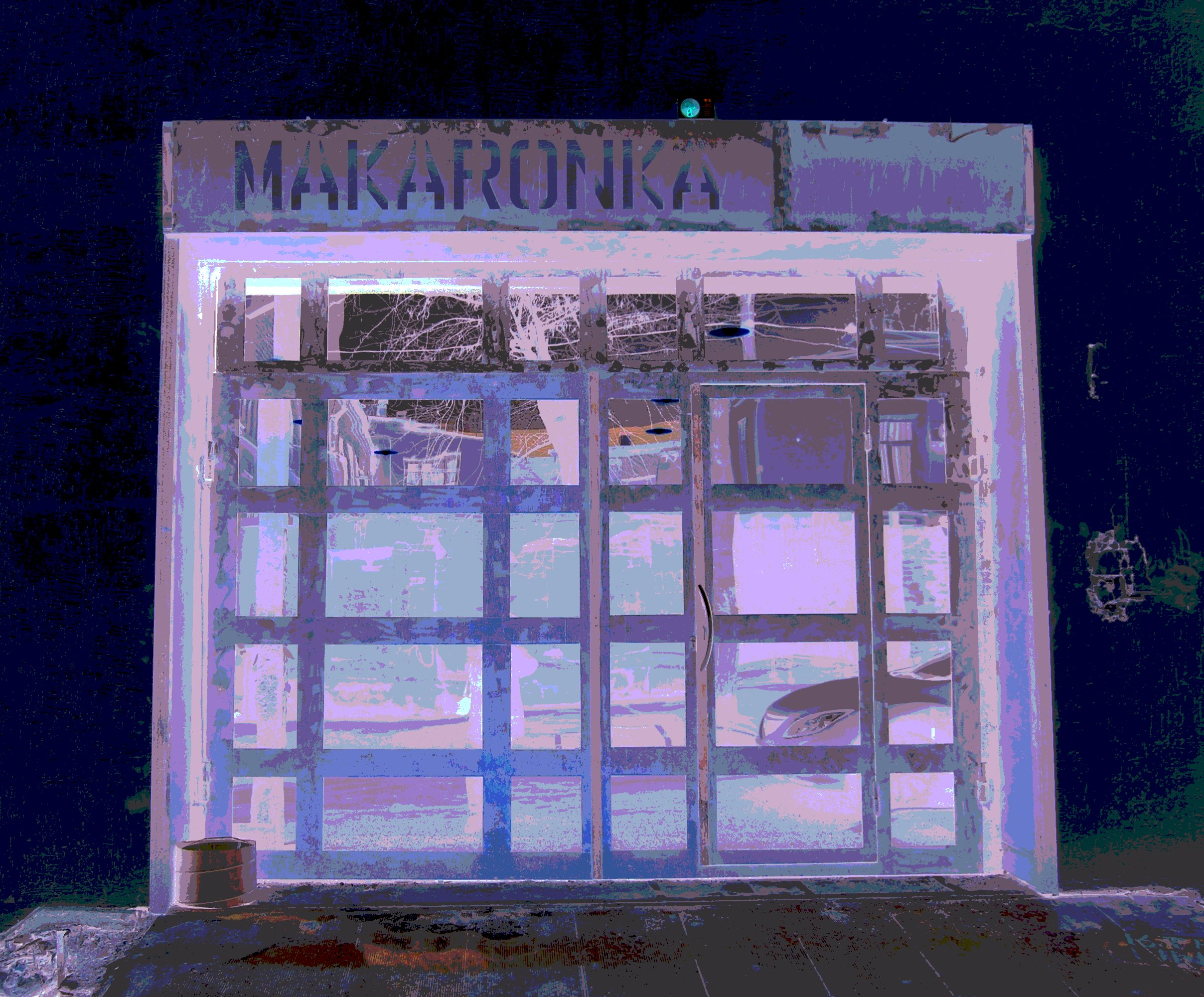
- Makaronka

- Location within Russia
- Type: Theatre
- Location: Rostov-on-Don, Rostov oblast Russia

History
- Built: 2012

Makaronka (Russian: Макаронка) is an art center located in the Russian port city of Rostov-on-Don. It brings together an experimental theater, an exhibition area, and the studios of various artists. Makaronka opened its doors as an art center on January 31, 2013 under the guidance of the 16th LINE art gallery.

== History ==
Prior to the opening of Makaronka, the site (located at #10, 18 Line St.) next to the 16th LINE art gallery was a pasta factory.

In August 2012, the Street Art Festival was held, which brought together exhibitions and other initiatives, including lectures, concerts, performances, and a graffiti contest. Lectures about street art were held during the weekends by experts from Moscow, St. Petersburg, Yekaterinburg, Perm, Tashkent, and other cities. About 50 street art and graffiti artists took part in the festival, including the famous Russian artists Kirill Who and Misha Most, as well as guests from Ukraine, Belarus and Germany.

Makaronka was inaugurated on January 31, 2013. The premiere of the 18+ Theatre – the documentary thrash-musical The Father, staged by Yuri Muravitsky from the play by Lyubov Mulmenko, was performed at the opening event, and an exhibition authored by the art group SIEVE was also on display.

Since February 2013, multiple screenings of non-commercial films, curated by Maxim Berezin, have been held in the auditorium of the Marakonka art center.

In August 2013, the contemporary art gallery, 16th LINE, and the Makaronka Art Center staged Rostov-on-Don's contemporary art festival, Cooperation Territory Festival.

== Selected projects ==
- 2013 – Festival of Contemporary Art, "Territory of Joint Action"
- 2013 – "Protocol of One Walk", art group "SIEVE"
- 2014 – "Monuments"
- 2016 – "Colour of the Sound", Nikolay Kovalenko
- 2017 – "Eternal Values. Ekorsha.", Alexander Kislyakov
