= Andrey Moguchy =

Russian stage director (born 1961)

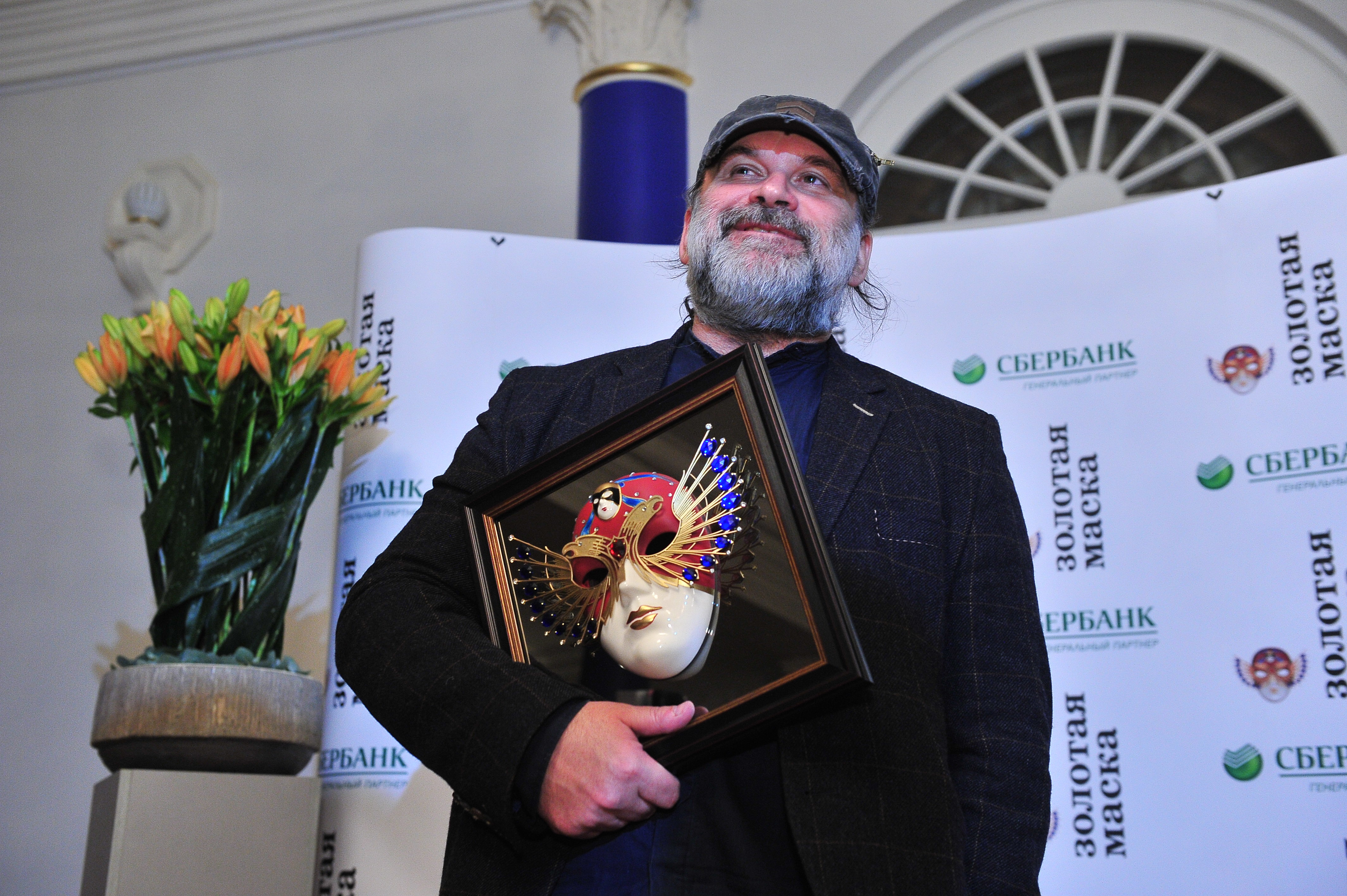
- Andrey Moguchy in 2016
- Born: 23 November 1961 (age 64); Leningrad, Soviet Union
- Occupation: Theatre director
- Years active: 1989–present

Andrey Anatolyevich Moguchy (Russian: Андрей Анатольевич Могучий; born November 23, 1961, in Leningrad, Soviet Union) is a Russian theatre director, primarily known for his work in drama theatre. Since 2013, Andrey Moguchy is the artistic director of the Bolshoi Drama in St. Petersburg. As of 2016, Andrey Moguchy is a professor at St. Petersburg Theatre Academy.

== Life and career ==
Andrey Moguchy has graduated from Leningrad Institute of Aerospace Instrumentation in 1984. He has then decided to pursue a career in arts and culture and obtained a degree from Leningrad Institute of Culture as a stage director, and an actor. In 1990, Moguchy has established independent theatre company Formal Theatre.

Since 1990, Moguchy has staged productions in many of the leading theatre in Russia, and across Europe, including Alexandrinsky Theatre, Finnish Theatre Academy, Theatre of Nations. He has staged operas, including a production with Valery Gergiev, and a dance gala at the Mariinsky Theatre for Diana Vishneva.

In 2013, Moguchy has been appointed artistic director of the Bolshoi Drama Theatre in St. Petersburg. In 2018, he developed a multimedia installation at the St. Petersburg Manege honouring hundredth anniversary of the museums in former royal residencies in Tsarskoe Selo, Pavlovsk, Peterhof and Gatchina.

== Europe Theatre Prize ==
In 2011, he was awarded the XII Europe Prize Theatrical Realities, in Saint Petersburg, with the following motivation:

He is a stage director. He has founded the Formalny theatre. His radical approach to the text, a daring and always unusual game with the space and the unpredictable choice of the site for each next performance, aroused bewilderment. His performances are a “territory of freedom” where any incredible experiments are possible. Moguchy’s experiments with synthesis of theater forms are inseparable from his quest of new dramaturgy, capable to indicate the “hurting points” of our time and express them in modern language.

== Selected awards ==
- Seven Golden Mask awards as Best Director, and for the Best Production (2001, 2006, 2008, 2011, 2012, 2016, 2017)
- Europe Theatre Prize — Europe Prize Theatrical Realities, sponsored by European Commission (2011)
- Edinburgh Fringe First Awards for House of Fools (2001)
