= Roman Silantyev =

Russian sociologist

Roman Anatolyevich Silantyev (Russian: Роман Анатольевич Силантьев, 15 September 1977) is a Russian sociologist, Islamic expert, former executive secretary of the Interreligious Council of Russia (IIRC), director of the human rights center of the World Russian People's Council, and former staff member of the Moscow Patriarchate Department for External Church Relations.

Born in Moscow, in 2005, Silantyev was relieved from his IIRC posts after the controversial reception of his book A Modern History of the Islamic Community in Russia, criticized both from the Muslim and Eastern Orthodox sides.

In 2007, Silantyev published another book A Modern History of Islam in Russia.

In 2008, Silantyev published Islam in Russia Today.

In 2018, Silantyev presented "destructology", claimed to be a scientific discipline. According to his basic article, "destructology" was "designed to provide serious counteraction to threats to Russia's national security."

In 2023, Silantyev committed the "destructological expertise", which was the basis for the arrest and pre-trial detention of the theatre director Evgenia Berkovich and playwright Svetlana Petriychuk. A group of lead Russian scientists published a letter, which states that the proposed by Silantyev "destructology" has features of pseudoscience and cannot be used in forensic expertise.
