= Dido and Aeneas discography =

This is a discography of Dido and Aeneas, an opera by Henry Purcell. The first known performance was at Josias Priest's girls' school in London in the spring of 1689.

== Recordings ==
Year	Cast: Dido, Belinda Aeneas, Sorceress	Conductor, opera house and orchestra	Label
1935	Nancy Evans; Mary Hamlin; Roy Henderson; Mary Jarred	Clarence Raybould; Boyd Neel String orchestra Charles Kennedy Scott's A Capella singers	Decca; Cat: X 101-107 (shellac 78s)
1945	Joan Hammond; Isobel Baillie; Dennis Noble; Edith Coates	Constant Lambert; Philharmonia Orchestra and chorus	Opera d'Oro; Cat: OPD-1220
1951	Eleanor Houston; Adele Leigh; Henry Cummings; Evelyn Cuthill	Jackson Gregory; Stuart Chamber Orchestra and Chorus of London	Period; Cat: SPLP 546 (LP)
	Irma Kolassi; Gisèle Vivarelli; Yvon le Marc'Hadour; Marguerite Pifteau	Pierre Capdevielle; Orchestre de la Suisse Romande; Geneva Conservatoire chorus	Cascavelle; Cat: VEL 3107
	Kirsten Flagstad; Maggie Teyte; Thomas Hemsley; Edith Coates	Geraint Jones; Mermaid orchestra and chorus	Walhall; Cat: WLCD0186
1952	Kirsten Flagstad; Elisabeth Schwarzkopf; Thomas Hemsley; Arda Mandikian	Geraint Jones; Mermaid orchestra and chorus	EMI; Cat: CDH7610062
1955	Martha Mödl; Dora Lindgreen; Hermann Prey; Gusta Hammer	Hans Schmidt-Isserstedt; NWDR-Sinfonieorchester Hamburg; Chor des Nordwestdeutschen Rundfunks Hamburg	UraCant; Cat: 2008
1959	Claire Watson; Jeannette Sinclair; Peter Pears; Arda Mandikian	Benjamin Britten; English Opera Group orchestra Purcell Singers	BBC Music; Cat: BBCB 8003–2
1960	Teresa Berganza; Hanny Steffek; Gérard Souzay; Jane Berbié	Pierre Dervaux; Orchestra and Chorus of the Aix-en-Provence Festival	Walhall; Cat: WLCD0326
1961	Janet Baker; Patricia Clark; Raimund Herincx; Monica Sinclair	Anthony Lewis; English Chamber Orchestra; St. Anthony Singers	Decca; Cat: 4663872
1963	Mary Thomas; Honor Sheppard; Maurice Bevan; Helen Watts	Alfred Deller; Oriana orchestra and chorus	Vanguard; Cat: 3003332
1965	Victoria de los Ángeles; Heather Harper; Peter Glossop; Patricia Johnson	John Barbirolli; English Chamber Orchestra; Ambrosian Singers	EMI; Cat: CDM 5 65664 2
1967	Tatiana Troyanos; Sheila Armstrong; Barry McDaniel; Patricia Johnson	Charles Mackerras; Chamber orchestra of the North German Radio; Monteverdi Chor	Deutsche Grammophon; Cat: 447 148–2
1970	Josephine Veasey; Helen Donath; John Shirley-Quirk; Elizabeth Bainbridge	Colin Davis; Academy of St Martin in the Fields; John Alldis Choir	Philips; Cat: 4428334 (CD); Pentatone; Cat: 827949023064 (SACD)
1971	Shirley Verrett; Helen Donath; Dan Iordăchescu; Oralia Domínguez	Raymond Leppard; Orchestra Sinfonica della RAI Torino; Ambrosian Singers	Arkadia; Cat: 619
1975	Janet Baker; Norma Burrowes; Peter Pears; Anna Reynolds	Steuart Bedford; Aldeburgh Festival strings orchestra London Opera chorus	Decca; Cat: 468 561–2
1977	Tatiana Troyanos; Felicity Palmer; Richard Stilwell; Alfreda Hodgson	Raymond Leppard; English Chamber Orchestra; English Chamber chorus	Erato; Cat: 2292–45263–2
1979	D'Anna Fortunato; Nancy Armstrong; Mark Baker; Bruce Fithian	Joël Cohen; Boston Camerata	LP: Harmonia Mundi; Cat: HM 10.067
1981	Emma Kirkby; Judith Nelson; David Thomas; Jantina Noorman	Andrew Parrott; Taverner Consort and Players	Chandos; Cat: CHAN 8306
1982	Ann Murray; Rachel Yakar; Anton Scharinger; Trudeliese Schmidt	Nikolaus Harnoncourt; Concentus Musicus Wien; Arnold Schoenberg Choir	Teldec; Cat: 4509–93686–2
1985	Guillemette Laurens; Jill Feldman; Philippe Cantor; Dominique Visse	William Christie; Les Arts Florissants	Harmonia Mundi; Cat: HMC 905173
	Teresa Berganza; Danielle Borst; Per-Arne Wahlgren; Glenys Linos	Michel Corboz; Ensemble instrumental de Lausanne; Lausanne City Opera chorus	Erato; Cat: 2292–45263–2
	Jessye Norman; Marie McLaughlin; Thomas Allen; Patricia Kern	Raymond Leppard; English Chamber Orchestra	Philips; Cat: 416 299–2
1988	Anne Sofie von Otter; Lynne Dawson; Stephen Varcoe; Nigel Rogers	Trevor Pinnock; The English Concert	Deutsche Grammophon; Cat: 427 624–1
1989	Della Jones; Donna Deam; Peter Harvey; Susan Bickley	Ivor Bolton; St. James's Baroque Players and chorus	Teldec; Cat: 4509–91191–2
	Rachel Ann Morgan; Camille van Lunen; David Barick; Myra Kroese	Roderick Shaw; Academy of the Begynhof Amsterdam	Globe; Cat: 5020
1990	Carolyn Watkinson; Ruth Holton; George Mosley; Teresa Shaw	John Eliot Gardiner; English Baroque Soloists; Monteverdi Choir	Philips; Cat: 432 114–2
1992	Catherine Bott; Emma Kirkby; John Mark Ainsley; David Thomas	Christopher Hogwood; Academy of Ancient Music	Decca; Cat: 475 7195
1993	Lorraine Hunt; Lisa Saffer; Michael Dean; Ellen Rabiner	Nicholas McGegan; Philharmonia Baroque Orchestra; Clare College, Cambridge chorus	Harmonia Mundi; Cat: HMU 907110
1994	Emily Van Evera; Ben Parry; Janet Lax; Haden Andrews	Andrew Parrott; Taverner Consort and Players	BBC Music Magazine; Cat: BBC MM129; Sony Classical, Cat: SK 62993; Avie, Cat:AV2309
	Kym Amps; Anna Crookes; David van Asch; Sarah Connolly	David van Asch; The Scholars Baroque Ensemble	Naxos; Cat: 8.553108
	Véronique Gens; Sophie Marin-Degor; Nathan Berg; Claire Brua	William Christie; Les Arts Florissants	Erato; Cat: 4509–98477–2
1995	Jennifer Lane; Cassandra Hoffman; Michael Brown; Desiree Halac	Bradley Brookshire; I Musici di San Cassiano	Vox; Cat: 7518
	Maria Ewing; Rebecca Evans; Karl Daymond; Sally Burgess	Richard Hickox; Collegium Musicum 90	Chandos; Cat: CHAN 0586
	Jennifer Lane; Ann Monoyios; Russell Braun; Jennifer Lane	Jeanne Lamon; Tafelmusik	CBC Records; Cat: SMCD 5147
1996	Nancy Maultsby; Susannah Waters; Russell Braun; Laura Tucker	Martin Pearlman; Boston Baroque	Telarc; Cat: 80424
1998	Lynne Dawson; Rosemary Joshua; Gerald Finley; Susan Bickley	René Jacobs; Orchestra of the Age of Enlightenment	Harmonia Mundi; Cat: HMX 2991683
2000	Laura Pudwell; Salomé Haller; Peter Harvey; Laura Pudwell	Hervé Niquet; Le Concert Spirituel	Glossa; Cat: GCD 921601
2002	Evelyn Tubb; Julia Matthews; Thomas Meglioranza; Evelyn Tubb	Predrag Gosta; New Trinity Baroque	Edition Lilac; Cat: 200204–2
2003	Susan Graham; Camilla Tilling; Ian Bostridge; Felicity Palmer	Emmanuelle Haïm; Le Concert d'Astrée; European Voices	Virgin Veritas; Cat: 5 45605 2
2004	Nicola Wemyss; Francine van der Heijden; Matthew Baker; Helen Rasker	Jed Wentz; Musica ad Rhenum	Brilliant; Cat: 92464
2007	Julianne Baird; Andrea Lauren Brown; Timothy Bentch; Tatyana Rashkovsky	Valentin Radu; Ama Deus Baroque Ensemble	Lyrichord; Cat: LEMS 8057
2008	Sarah Connolly; Lucy Crowe; Gerald Finley; Patricia Bardon	Steven Devine and Elizabeth Kenny; Orchestra of the Age of Enlightenment; Choir of the Enlightenment	Chandos; Cat: CHAN 0757
2008	Simone Kermes; Deborah York; Dimitris Tiliakos; Oleg Ryabets	Teodor Currentzis; MusicAeterna; The New Siberian Singers	Alpha; Cat: 140
2009	Solenn' Lavanant Linke; Yeree Suh; Alejandro Meerapfel; Fabian Schofrin	Leonardo García Alarcón; Cappella Mediterranea; La Nouvelle Menestrandie	Ambronay; Cat: AMY022
2010	Malena Ernman; Judith Van Wanroij; Christopher Maltman; Hilary Summers	William Christie; Les Arts Florissants	FRA Musica; Cat: FRA001 (DVD) & FRA501 (Blu-ray)
2014	Rachael Lloyd; Elin Manahan Thomas; Robert Davies; Roderick Morris	Christopher Monks; Armonico Consort	signum Cat: SIGCD417

== Critical attention ==
In Opera on Record, ed. Alan Blyth (Hutchinson & Co./Beaufort Books, Inc., 1983), Graham Sheffield (pp. 11–25) was one of the first authors to supply a comparative discography, praising, for period authenticity, the recordings by Cohen (1978) and Parrott (1981). He found flaws in nearly every recording, but also particular assets, e.g. Roy Henderson in the 1935 recording, Isobel Baillie in 1945, the conducting of Geraint Jones in 1951, several aspects of Lewis's 1961 recording, Peter Glossop in 1965, Mackerras' theatrical instinct in 1967, and Colin Davis' "immense vitality and musicianship" in 1970; apart from Veasey's Dido, he finds sufficient quality in all the vocal contributions to recommend this last as the most important 'non-period' recording.

The Haïm recording (2004 in US) received a highly complimentary review from Allan Kozinn, saying it surpassed Parrott's 1981 production, the latter "[u]ntil now, the best". Kozinn noted orchestration and vocal range innovations by Haïm, as well as strong major and minor cast members.
