= Mauny =

Mauny may refer to:

== People ==
- Constance Mauny (born 1998), French handball player
- Erik de Mauny (1920–1997), English journalist and author
- Marc de Mauny (born 1971), French theatre manager and opera producer
- Walter Mauny, also known as Walter Manny, 1st Baron Manny

== Places ==
- Mauny, Seine-Maritime, Normandy, France
