= Matthew James Baker =

Matthew James Baker may refer to:

- Matt Baker (born 1977), British television presenter
- Matt Baker (born c. 1974), founder of UsefulCharts

== See also ==
- Matthew Baker (disambiguation)
