= The Turn of the Screw (opera) =

1954 opera by Benjamin Britten

- Chamber opera by Benjamin Britten
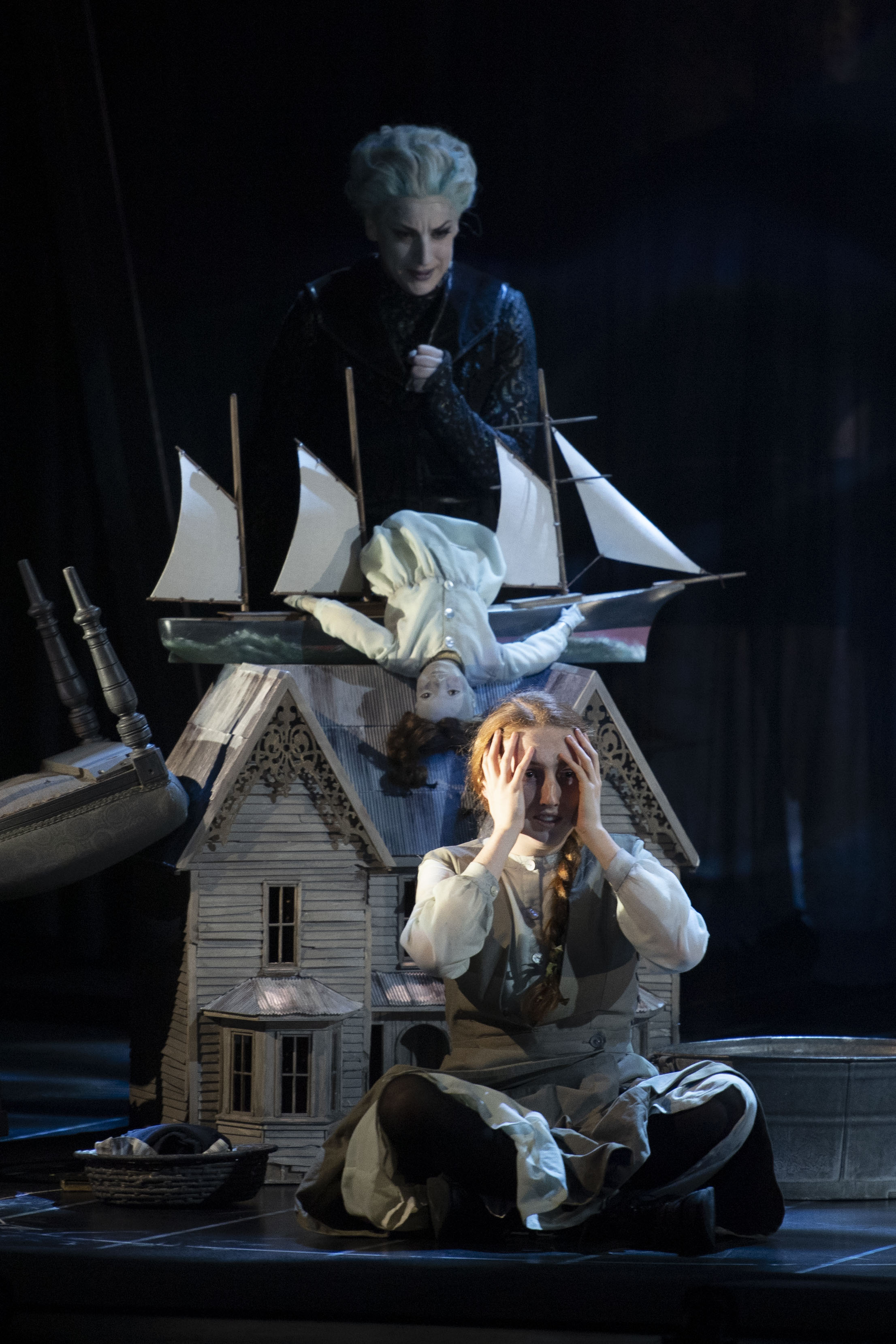
- Miss Jessel haunts Flora in the 2019 New Zealand Opera production
- Librettist: Myfanwy Piper
- Language: English
- Based on: The Turn of the Screw by Henry James
- Premiere: 14 September 1954; Teatro La Fenice, Venice

The Turn of the Screw, Op. 54, is a 20th-century English chamber opera composed by Benjamin Britten, with a libretto by Myfanwy Piper, based on the 1898 novella The Turn of the Screw by Henry James.

It concerns a young, inexperienced governess sent to a country house to care for two children, who she is gradually convinced have been corrupted by the ghosts of a previous manservant and governess. The drama grows increasingly tense, with a tragic outcome.

It has been described by The Guardian as one of the most dramatically appealing of Britten's operas, and by music professor Peter Evans as "Britten's most intricately organized opera". It is in two acts of eight scenes each, with a prologue that ends with the introduction of a twelve-note 'Screw' theme. Each scene is preceded by a variation on that theme. Several other related leitmotifs occur through the opera. Typically of Britten, the music mixes tonality and atonality.

== Performance history ==
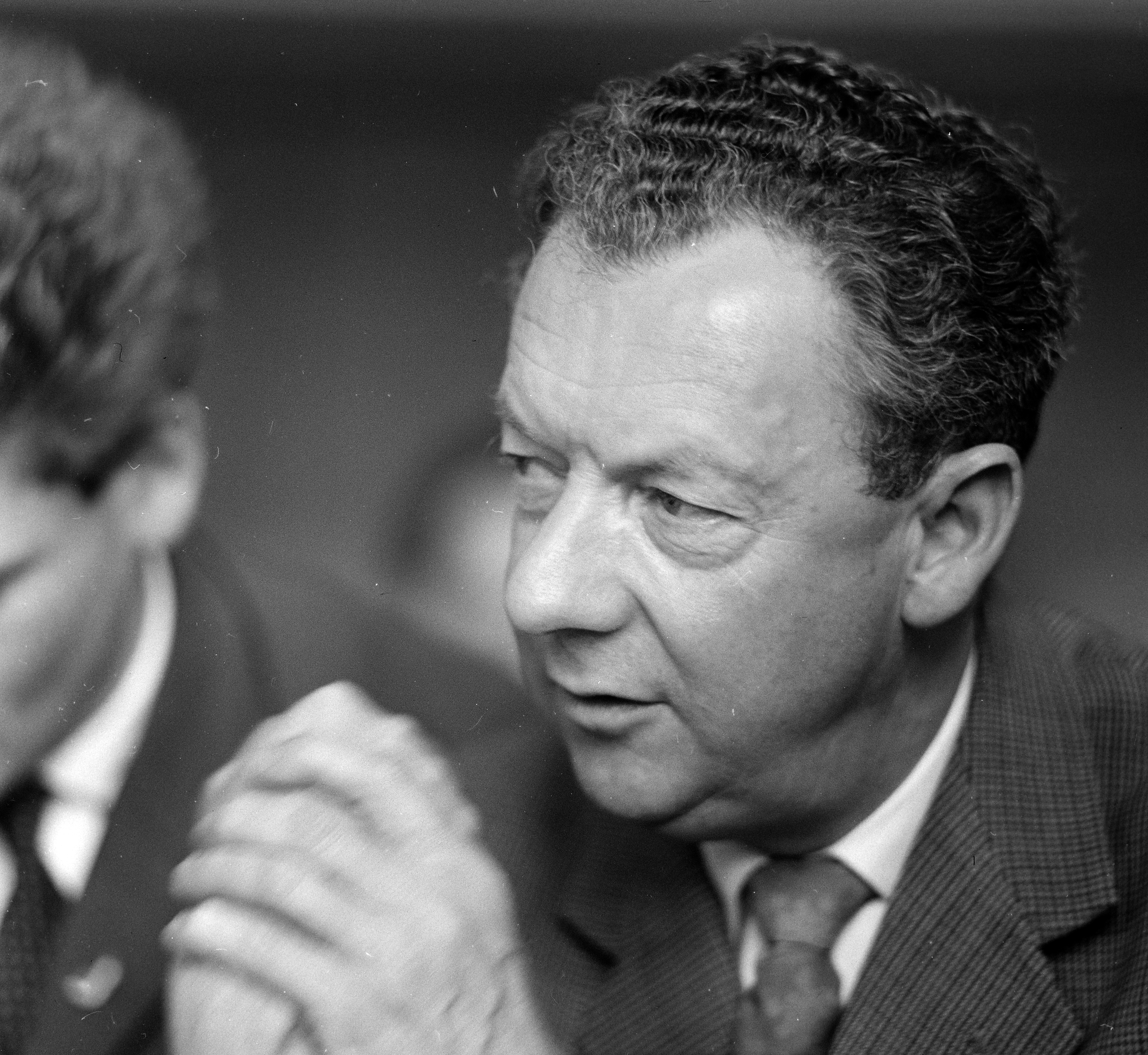
The composer in 1964

The opera was commissioned by the Venice Biennale, written in four months, and given its world premiere on 14 September 1954, at the Teatro La Fenice, Venice, with the composer conducting, and as in many other Britten works, his life-partner tenor Peter Pears in a leading role, that of Quint. The original cast recording was made during January of the next year.

The opera was given its British premiere on 6 October 1954 by the Sadler's Wells Opera in London; the North American premiere on 23 August 1957 at Canada's Stratford Festival with the English Opera Group; the US premiere followed on 19 March 1958 at the New York College of Music. Peter Morley made a TV version for ITV in 1959 which had been lost until its rediscovery in the early 2000s. It was staged at the New York City Opera in 1996 with Lauren Flanigan as the Governess and Christine Abraham as Miss Jessel.

In 2003, English Touring Opera presented the work throughout England and three years later Glyndebourne Touring Opera toured the UK with their new production of the work before reviving it in 2007 at their summer festival, Glyndebourne Festival Opera. Opera Queensland staged Neil Armfield's production in 2005 which featured the solo professional operatic debut of Kate Miller-Heidke as Flora.

Los Angeles Opera performed the Glyndebourne Touring Opera production of the work in 2011 under music director James Conlon. OperaUpClose reframed the opera in their 2011 production, the story being told from the point of the view of the Governess as a patient in an asylum. It is left unclear as to whether the story stems completely from her mind or whether she arrived there after her experiences in the Bly house. Opera Moderne produced the work in 2012 at Symphony Space in New York under the stage direction of Luke Leonard.

Opera Holland Park received positive reviews of their presentation of the work in six performances in summer 2014.

For a limited run in 2018, Regent's Park Open Air Theatre presented a co-production with the English National Opera, directed by Timothy Sheader and conducted by Toby Purser.

On 6 June 2021, a version by OperaGlass Works was broadcast by BBC4. The new staging of the opera, at Wilton's Music Hall, London, had been scheduled for a run in March 2020, but this was prevented by the lockdown. Instead, the performance was reworked as a film, shot on location at the Victorian music hall. The whole space of the venue, not just the stage, was used to tell the story.

== Roles ==
Characters in 2019 New Zealand Opera production

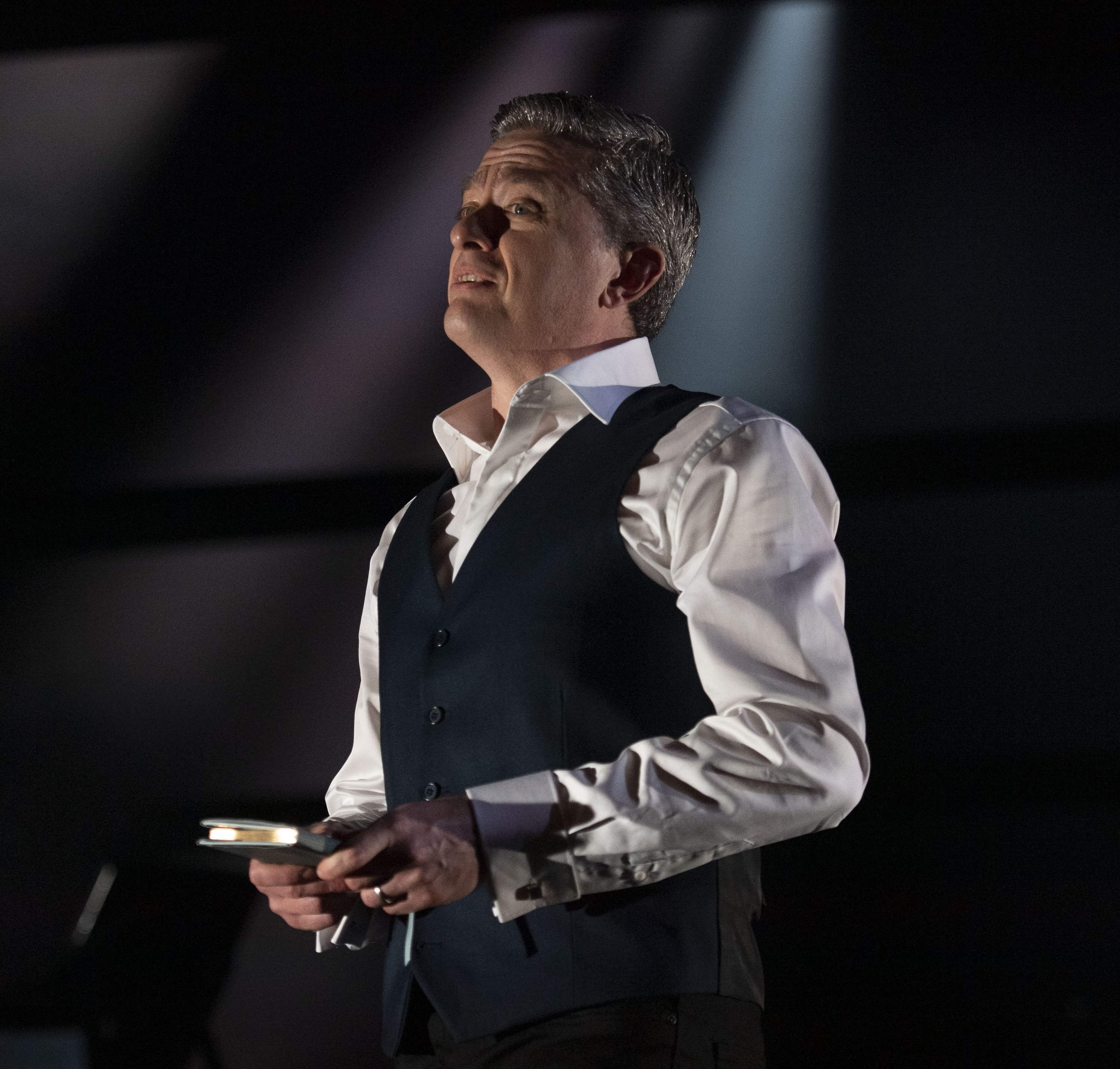
Prologue (Jared Holt)

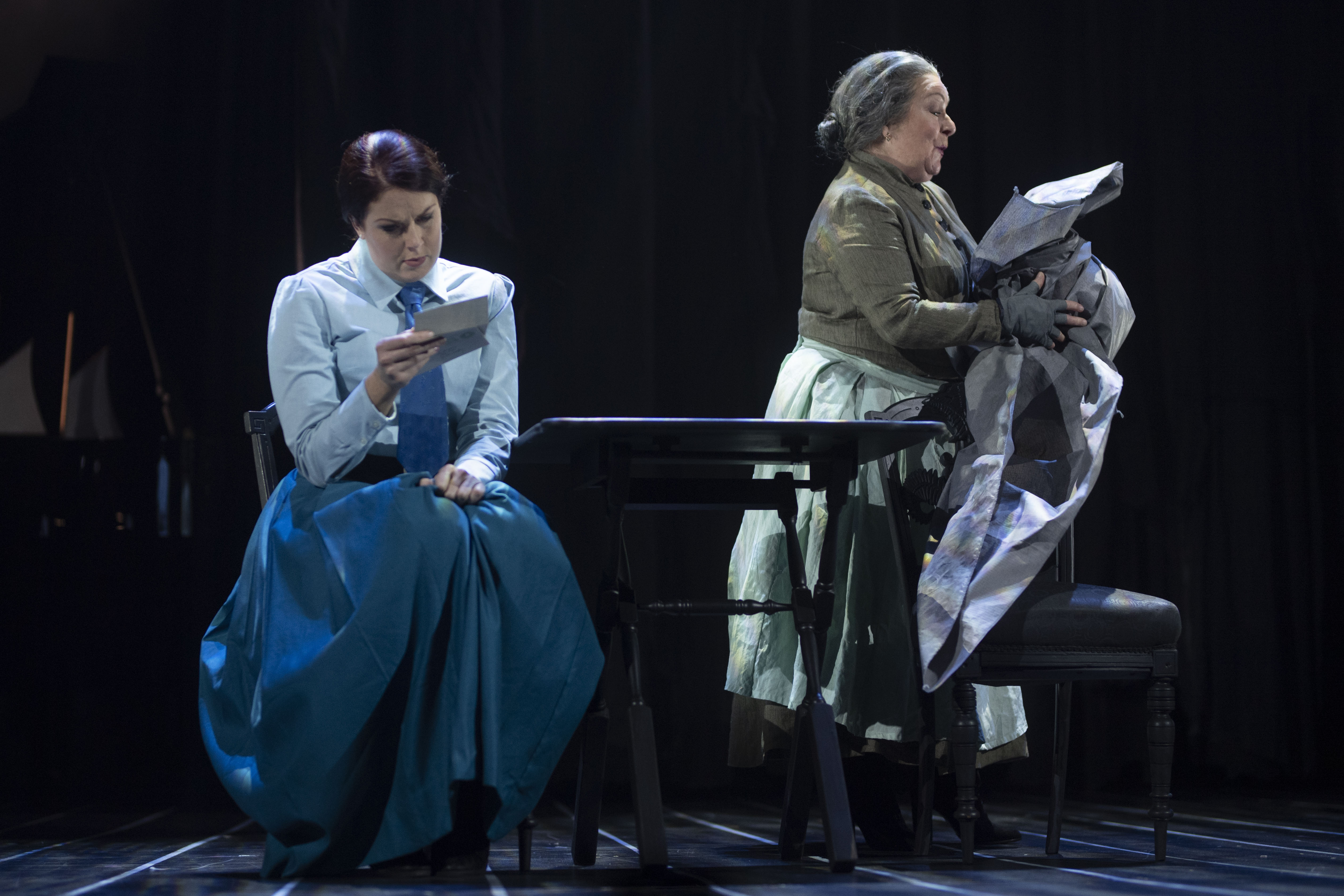
The Governess (Anna Leese) and Mrs. Grose (Patricia Wright)

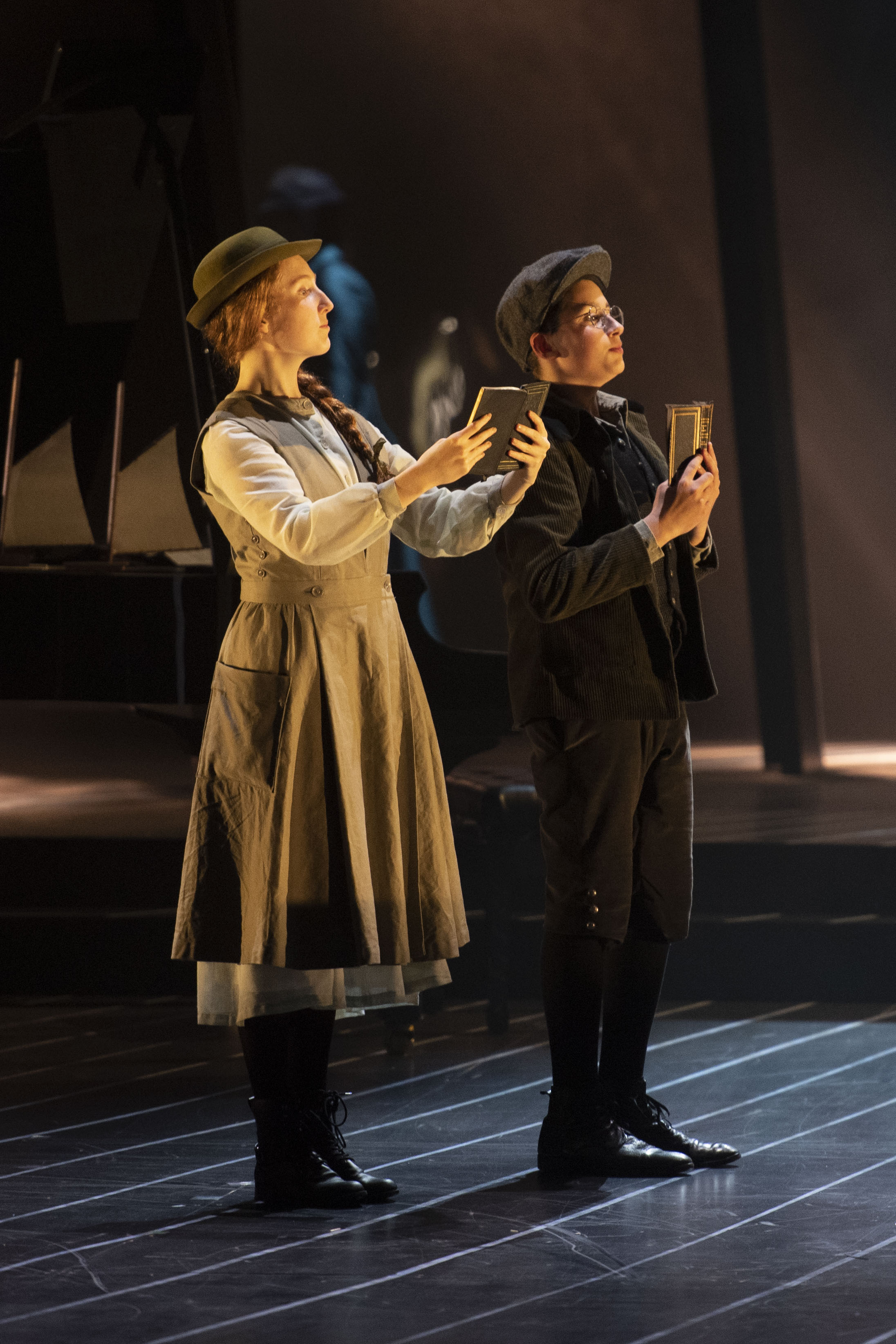
Flora and Miles (Alexa Harwood and Alexandros Swallow)

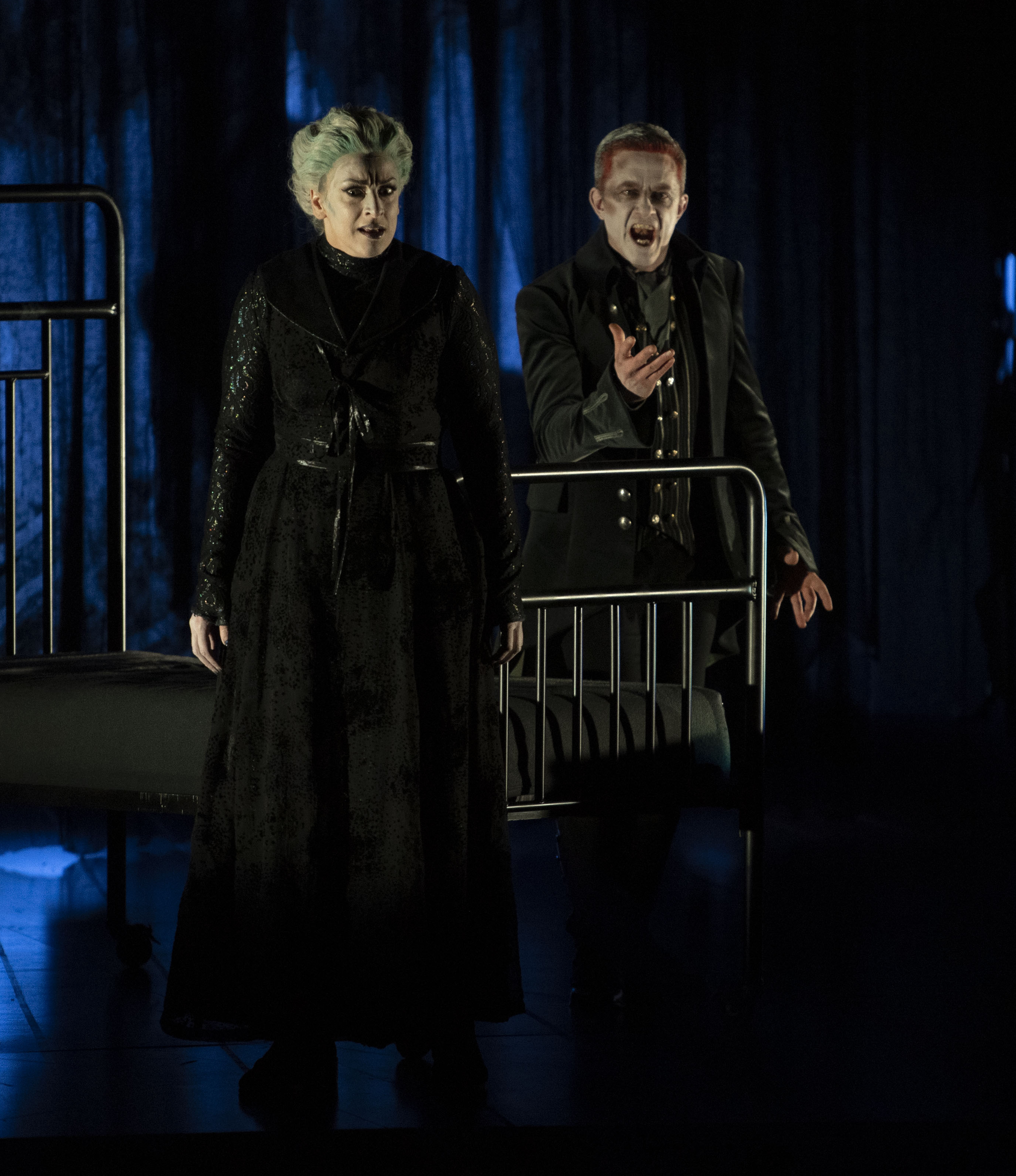
Miss Jessel (Madeleine Pierard) and Peter Quint (Jared Holt)

Roles, voice types, premiere cast
| Role | Voice type | Premiere cast, 14 September 1954 Conductor: Benjamin Britten |
|---|---|---|
| Prologue | tenor | Peter Pears |
| Governess | soprano | Jennifer Vyvyan |
| Miles | treble | David Hemmings |
| Flora | soprano | Olive Dyer |
| Mrs. Grose, the housekeeper | soprano | Joan Cross |
| Miss Jessel, the former governess | soprano | Arda Mandikian |
| Peter Quint, the former manservant | tenor | Peter Pears |

== Synopsis ==
Time: The middle of the nineteenth century
Place: Bly, an English country house

=== Prologue ===
A male Prologue tells of the "curious story" he has in a faded manuscript, written by a young, unnamed Governess to two children, "long ago". She had been hired by their uncle and guardian in London, "young... bold, offhand and gay" and too busy with "affairs, travel, friends, visits" to care for them. When he stipulates that she is never to bother him about the children, never to write, but to be silent, the "Screw" theme is heard in fragments then, as she accepts, in full, followed by its first variation, suggestive of a coach.

=== Act 1 ===
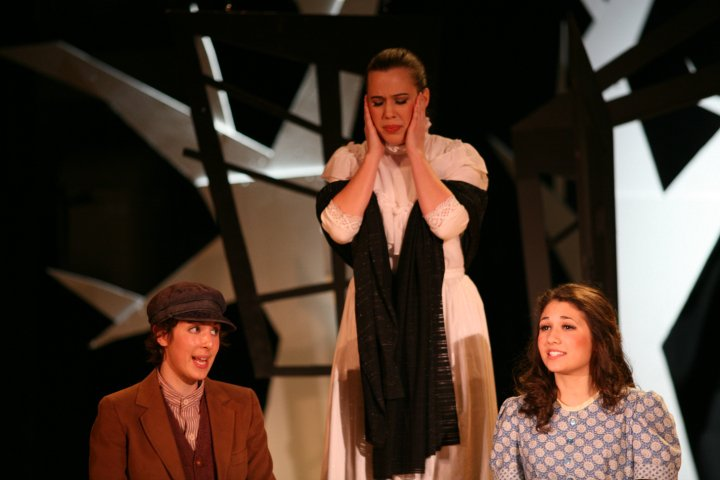
Miles, Governess, Flora (Brown Opera Productions, 2010)

(Scene 1 – The Journey) In the coach, the Governess is apprehensive about her new position ("O why, why did I come?" – a motif recurring throughout the opera).

(Scene 2 – The Welcome) When she arrives at Bly, the housekeeper Mrs. Grose greets her, and the children bow and curtsy as they have been rehearsed. The Governess sings that she begins to love Bly, now her home, and tells Mrs Grose that the lively children will do better with a young, clever person like her.

(Scene 3 – The Letter) A letter from Miles' school arrives. Mrs Grose muses that now all will be well, but the letter says Miles has been expelled, giving only a vague "injury to his friends" as reason. Mrs Grose considers it normal for a boy sometimes to be "wild", but they agree that Miles can not be "bad". Hearing the children sing "Lavender's blue" together reassures the women, and the Governess decides to ignore the letter.

(Scene 4 – The Tower) Walking in the grounds in the evening (after a variation suggesting birdsong), the Governess sings about their beauty and the charm of the children. Setting aside her fears about footsteps she has heard outside her door and cries in the night, she wishes only that she could impress the uncle. Suddenly, she spots a man on a tower of the house (to the sound of a celesta). He disappears and she wonders who it can be ("Who is it? Who?").

(Scene 5 – The Window) In the house, the children sing "Tom, Tom, the Piper's Son" (to the grotesque, syncopated beat of the previous variation) and the Governess sees the man again, looking in through a window. Frightened, she asks Mrs. Grose about him, and when she describes him, the housekeeper bursts out, "Dear God, is there no end to his dreadful ways?" (a motif recurring from here on) It is Peter Quint, the former valet at Bly. Mrs. Grose says "It was not for me to say ... I had only to see to the house" but ambiguously that Quint "was free with" Miles, and with Miss Jessel, the well-born and beautiful previous governess, and "had his will, morning and night". Mrs Grose feared him and didn't act. Miss Jessel left the house "to die." The Governess is startled to learn that Quint has died too, in a fall on an icy road. She rededicates herself to protecting the children "that they may see and know nothing" (to the "O why did I come?" theme).

(Scene 6 – The Lesson) The next morning, Miles is learning Latin ("Many nouns in -is we find, to the masculine are assigned"), when he unexpectedly sings a sad song, "Malo", based on the meanings of the Latin word, another recurring motif.

(Scene 7 – The Lake) By the side of Bly's lake, Flora, studying geography with the Governess, names seas of the world. Invited to name the lake, she dramatically calls it the Dead Sea. As she sings a strange lullaby ("Today by the dead salt sea") to her doll, the Governess suddenly sees a woman across the lake (to the sound of a gong). Realising it is the ghost of Miss Jessel, she sends Flora home to safety and sings that it is far worse than she dreamed and that the children are "lost".

(Scene 8 – At Night) Miles has slipped outside in his nightclothes, and from the tower Quint sings beguilingly to him ("Miles! Miles!" – a variant of "O why did I come") and of mysteries ("I am all things strange and bold") while Miss Jessel sings to Flora to come to her to see "all those we have wept for together". The Governess and Mrs. Grose interrupt them and the ghosts depart. Miles tells the Governess, "You see, I am bad, aren't I?"

=== Act 2 ===
(Scene 1 – Colloquy and Soliloquy) The ghosts of Quint and Miss Jessel are "nowhere". They argue ("Why did you call me from my schoolroom dreams?") about whether Quint caused Miss Jessel's downfall, but unite that they will claim the children ("Day by day the bars we break", the only time the "Screw" theme is sung) culminating with "The ceremony of innocence is drowned" (to the "O why did I come?" theme). Also nowhere, the Governess laments ("Lost in my labyrinth") that her innocence has not prepared her for the evil that surrounds her.

(Scene 2 – The Bells) On a Sunday morning (after a variation for tubular bells), the family is on its way to church. The children sing a psalm, but its words become increasingly sinister. Mrs. Grose reassures the Governess that the children are happy, but the Governess tells her to listen to their "horrors". Alarmed, Mrs. Grose advises the Governess to write to their uncle. At first she declines, remembering his stipulation. Mrs Grose and Flora go into the church, and Miles asks the Governess when he is going back to school. She prevaricates, but when Miles indicates he knows about her fears and mentions "the others", she realises things are much worse than she thought. She can not rely on Mrs Grose ("It was not for me to say" in the strings) and decides to flee Bly and abandon the children –

(Scene 3 – Miss Jessel) But when she enters the children's schoolroom, Miss Jessel is seated at her desk. The spectre bemoans her fate, and sings that here she will have revenge. The Governess challenges her until she vanishes. She writes to the children's uncle (strings suggest a scratching pen, woodwind, the words she writes, then reads: "Sir, my dear sir, I have not forgotten my vow of silence"), telling him only that she must speak with him.

(Scene 4 – The Bedroom) That night, the Governess tells Miles that she has written to his uncle, and questions him about what happened at school, and at Bly before she came. Quint, unseen, tells Miles he is there, waiting. The candle goes out and Miles says it was he who blew it (to the notes of "I am bad"). Quint wonders what is in the letter and (Scene 5 – Quint) tells Miles to take it, which he does.

(Scene 6 – The Piano) Miles plays the piano for the Governess and Mrs. Grose (scales, fragments of the "Screw" theme and "Malo"). Flora and Mrs Grose play cat's cradle ("Cradles for cats are string and air") and Flora lulls Mrs Grose to sleep with her doll's lullaby, then slips away. When the women realise she is gone, they go out to look for her as Miles plays on triumphantly.

(Scene 7 – Flora) Finding Flora at the lake, the Governess confronts her: "And where, my pet, is Miss Jessel?" Miss Jessel immediately appears, calling across the lake to Flora, but Mrs. Grose sees nothing. The Governess tries to force Flora to admit she can see Miss Jessel, but Flora vehemently denies it, telling the Governess she hates her. Mrs. Grose, convinced by Flora, takes her home. The Governess feels abandoned by Mrs. Grose and that she has "most miserably failed, and there is no more innocence in me."

(Scene 8 – Miles) Next morning (after "a variation which conflates all twelve notes of the theme in dense masses") Mrs. Grose admits, from what Flora has said in the night, that the Governess was right, and agrees to take Flora away. She tells the Governess that the letter was never mailed and that Miles must have taken it. The Governess confronts Miles. ("So my dear, we are alone" – the "Screw" theme plays under the rest of the scene as a passacaglia.) As she questions him, Quint pressures Miles not to betray him. Miles confesses that he took the letter. The Governess demands to know who made him do it. After denials, Miles cries out "Peter Quint! You devil!" and falls. The Governess and Quint sing together, she that Miles is saved, he that the ghosts have failed. Quint disappears ("Farewell!" to the "Miles! Miles!" theme). The Governess cradles Miles in her arms, at first rejoicing that they have destroyed Quint, but when she realises Miles is dead, singing "Malo" as his threnody, and asking "What have we done between us?"

== Themes ==
The 'Screw'

Britten's twelve-note 'Screw' theme may be described as a sequence of alternating rising fourths and falling minor thirds. This generates two interleaved whole-tone scales: They therefore imply an infinitely extended pattern; as Peter Evans says, "this screw can turn forever."

The 12 notes may be divided into three equivalent tetrachords, each a segment of the circle of fifths: D–A–E–B, F♯–C♯–G♯–D ♯, B♭–F–C–G, which are played in the sequence of A–D–B–E, C♯–F♯–D♯–G♯, F–B♭–G–C.

The theme as it first appears in the piano, 9 measures before rehearsal number 1:

Peter Evans argues that the keys or "centres" of the Variations follow the notes of the row, and that the tonality of A corresponds to the Governess's moral courage, against that of A flat, representing the forces of evil. He minimises the influence of Arnold Schoenberg in the use of a 12-note row, saying while Britten's "use of such a theme as the basis of innumerable variants is clearly indebted to Schoenberg's example," he has not "regarded the twelve notes as constituting a negation of tonal hierarchies, but rather as a ramification of them."

"O why did I come?"

Evans shows that the sequence of the Governess's "O why did I come?" (which is also that of Quint's "Miles! Miles!" and makes 18 other appearances) is derived from the 'Screw' theme. He calls it "the corruption theme".

"Miles! Miles!"

"Dear God, is there no end to his dreadful ways"

"Malo"

== Instrumentation ==
There are usually 13 players in the orchestra. The instruments used are: Two violins, viola, cello, double bass, flute/alto flute/piccolo, oboe/english horn, clarinet/bass clarinet, bassoon, French horn, harp, piano/celesta and percussion.

| Instrument | Premiere musician | Instrument | Premiere musician | Instrument | Premiere musician |
|---|---|---|---|---|---|
| first violin | Olive Zorian | flute, alto flute, piccolo | John Francis | harp | Enid Simon |
| second violin | Suzanne Rosza | oboe, English horn | Joy Boughton | piano, celesta | Martin Isepp |
| viola | Cecil Aronowitz | clarinet in A and B♭, bass clarinet | Stephen Waters | percussion | James Blades |
| cello | Terence Weil | bassoon | Vernon Elliott | | |
| double bass | Francis Baines | French horn | Charles Gregory | | |

The percussionist plays a glockenspiel, tubular bells, triangle, wood block, side drum, tenor drum, bass drum, tom-tom, timpani (4), a suspended cymbal and a gong.

== Lyric and melodic sources ==
"Tom, Tom, the Piper's Son" and "Lavender's Blue" are traditional British nursery rhymes.

The lyrics to Miles' song "Many nouns in -is we find, to the masculine are assigned" are a mnemonic for Latin students, listing nouns of the third declension, which end in -is in the nominative singular case, and are generally of the masculine grammatical gender.

In the song "Malo", the word is: 1) the first-person singular of the irregular verb malle, "to prefer," ("I would rather be"); 2) the ablative singular of mālum, "apple" ("in an apple tree"); 3) the ablative singular of malus, "bad" ("than a naughty boy" and "in adversity").

An Oxford English professor argues that the Latin words used in the lesson and church scenes are code for sexual terms.

The line "The ceremony of innocence is drowned" sung by Quint and Miss Jessel, is taken from the poem "The Second Coming" by W. B. Yeats.

== Selected recordings ==
| Year | Cast: Prologue, Governess, Mrs Grose, Miles, Flora, Peter Quint, Miss Jessel | Conductor, opera house and orchestra | Label |
|---|---|---|---|
| 1955 | Peter Pears, Jennifer Vyvyan, Joan Cross, David Hemmings, Olive Dyer, Peter Pears, Arda Mandikian | Benjamin Britten, London Symphony Orchestra | Decca, Cat: 425672 |
| 1981 | Philip Langridge, Helen Donath, Ava June, Michael Ginn, Lillian Watson, Robert Tear, Heather Harper | Colin Davis, Royal Opera House Orchestra | Philips, Cat:446 325-2 |
| 1993 | Philip Langridge, Felicity Lott, Phyllis Cannan, Sam Pay, Eileen Hulse, Philip Langridge, Nadine Secunde | Steuart Bedford, Aldeburgh Festival Ensemble | Naxos, Cat: 8.660109-10 |
| 2002 | Ian Bostridge, Joan Rodgers, Jane Henschel, Julian Leang, Caroline Wise, Ian Bostridge, Vivian Tierney | Daniel Harding, Mahler Chamber Orchestra | Virgin, Cat: 545521-2 |
