= Dmitri Tcherniakov =

Russian theatre director

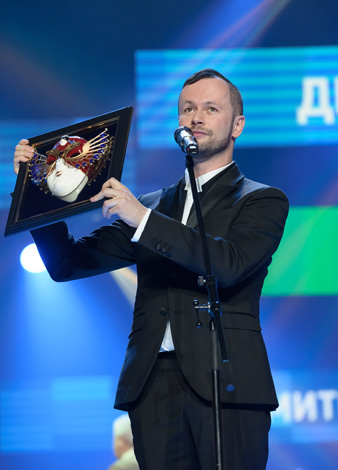
- Born: May 11, 1970 (age 56); Moscow, Russia
- Occupations: Opera director, theatre director.

Dmitri Tcherniakov (Russian: Дмитрий Черняков) (born May 11, 1970) is a Russian theatre director, and winner of numerous national Golden Mask theatre awards, who works with many European opera houses.

== Biography ==
Tcherniakov was born in Moscow. In 1993 he graduated from Russian Academy of Theatre Arts as a stage director. He started his career in the Russian Drama Theatre of Lithuania in Vilnius. Then he directed opera and drama in many major Russian cities, including Moscow, Saint Petersburg, Novosibirsk, Omsk, Samara, Kazan and others. He usually creates the scenic design and costumes for his productions.

=== Awards ===
Tcherniakov was awarded the Golden Mask for Best Director of Opera for the following productions:

- 2002: Rimsky-Korsakov's The Legend of the Invisible City of Kitezh and the Maiden Fevroniya.
- 2004: Igor Stravinsky's The Rake's Progress.
- 2005: Giuseppe Verdi's Aida.
- 2008: Tchaikovsky's Eugene Onegin.

== Works ==
=== Opera ===
- 1998 – Vladimir Kobekin's Young David; world premiere at the Novosibirsk Opera and Ballet Theatre.
- 2001 – Nicolai Rimsky-Korsakov's The Legend of the Invisible City of Kitezh and the Maiden Fevroniya conducted by Valeri Gergiev at Mariinsky Theatre.
- 2003 – Igor Stravinsky's The Rake's Progress at the Bolshoi Theatre.
- 2004 – Giuseppe Verdi's Aida at Novosibirsk Opera and Ballet Theatre.
- 2004 – Mikhail Glinka's A Life for the Tsar at the Mariinsky Theatre.
- 2005 – Richard Wagner's Tristan und Isolde at the Mariinsky Theatre.
- 2005 – Modest Mussorgsky's Boris Godunov conducted by Daniel Barenboim at the Berlin State Opera.
- 2006 – Pyotr Illych Tchaikovsky's Eugene Onegin at the Bolshoi Theatre.
- 2007 – Modest Mussorgsky's Khovanshchina conducted by Kent Nagano at the Bavarian State Opera Munich.
- 2008 – Sergei Prokofiev's The Gambler conducted by Daniel Barenboim at the Berlin State Opera and La Scala Milano.
- 2008 – Dmitri Shostakovich's Lady Macbeth of the Mtsensk District conducted by John Fiore at the Deutsche Oper am Rhein.
- 2009 – Giuseppe Verdi's Macbeth conducted by Teodor Currentzis at the Opéra Bastille Paris and the Novosibirsk Opera and Ballet Theatre.
- 2009 – Alban Berg's Wozzeck conducted by Teodor Currentzis at the Bolshoi Theatre.
- 2010 – Francis Poulenc's Dialogues des Carmelites conducted by Kent Nagano at the Bavarian State Opera Munich.
- 2010 – Richard Wagner's Tristan und Isolde conducted by Valeri Gergiev at the Mariinsky Theatre.
- 2010 – Wolfgang Amadeus Mozart's Don Giovanni conducted by Louis Langrée at the Aix-en-Provence Festival and by Teodor Currentzis at the Bolshoi Theatre.
- 2011 – Mikhail Glinka's Ruslan and Ludmila conducted by Vladimir Jurowski at the Bolshoi Theatre.
- 2011 – Giuseppe Verdi's Simon Boccanegra conducted by Garder at English National Opera and 2013 by Bertrand de Billy at the Bavarian State Opera Munich
- 2012 – Giuseppe Verdi's Il trovatore conducted by Marc Minkowski at Theatre de la Monnaie Bruxelles.
- 2012 – Leoš Janácek's Jenufa conducted by Fabio Luisi at Opernhaus Zürich.
- 2012 – Nicolai Rimsky-Korsakov's The Legend of the Invisible City of Kitezh and the Maiden Fevroniya conducted by Marc Albrecht at De Nederlandse Opera.
- 2013 – Giuseppe Verdi's La Traviata conducted by Daniele Gatti at the La Scala Milan
- 2013 – Nicolai Rimsky-Korsakov's The Tsar's Bride conducted by Daniel Barenboim at the Berlin State Opera.
- 2014 – Alexander Borodin's Prince Igor conducted by Gianandrea Noseda at the Metropolitan Opera, and in 2017 by Stanislav Kochanovsky at De Nederlandse Opera.
- 2015 – Richard Wagner's Parsifal conducted by Daniel Barenboim at the Berlin State Opera.
- 2015 – Alban Berg's Lulu conducted by Kirill Petrenko at the Bavarian State Opera Munich.
- 2015 – Dmitri Shostakovich's Lady Macbeth of the Mtsensk District conducted by Mark Wigglesworth at the English National Opera.
- 2016 Tchaikovsky's Iolanta/The Nutcracker conducted by Alain Altinoglu at the Paris Opéra Garnier
- 2016 Debussy’s Pelléas et Mélisande conducted by Alain Altinoglu at Opernhaus Zürich
- 2016 Bartók’s Bluebeard’s Castle and Eötvös’ Senza Sangue conducted by Gregory Vajda at Hamburg State Opera
- 2017 – Bizet's Carmen conducted by Pablo Heras-Casado at the Grand Théâtre de Provence, Aix-en-Provence Festival.
- 2017 Nicolai Rimsky-Korsakov’s The Snow Maiden conducted by Mikhail Tatarnikov at the Paris Opéra Bastille
- 2018 Richard Wagner’s Tristan und Isolde conducted by Daniel Barenboim at Berlin State Opera
- 2019 Hector Berlioz’ Les Troyens conducted by Philippe Jordan at the Paris Opéra Bastille
- 2019 Sergei Prokofiev’s Betrothal in a Monastery conducted by Daniel Barenboim at Berlin State Opera
- 2019 Nicolai Rimsky-Korsakov’s The Tale of Tsar Saltan conducted by Alain Altinoglu at the Theatre de la Monnaie Bruxelles
- 2019 Leoš Janáček’s The Makropulos Case conducted by Jacub Hruša at Opernhaus Zürich
- 2021 Richard Wagner‘s Fliegender Holländer conducted by Oksana Lyniv at Bayreuther Festspiele, Asmik Grigorian as Senta and John Lundgren (as Cptn. Hollaender)
- 2023 – Wolfgang Mozart's Così fan tutte conducted by Thomas Hengelbrock at the Théatre de l'Archevêché, Aix-en-Provence Festival.
- 2024 – Christoph Willibald Gluck's Iphigénie en Aulide and Iphigénie en Tauride conducted by Emmanuelle Haim at the Grand Théâtre de Provence, Aix-en-Provence Festival.

=== Drama ===
- 1998 – Goat-Island based on Ugo Betti's Crime on Goat-Island in Novosibirsk Theatre of Drama.
- 2001 – West Side Story in Samara Theatre of Drama.
- 2002 – Pierre de Marivaux's Double Inconstancy in Novosibirsk Globus Theatre.
