= Marc de Mauny =

French theatre manager and opera producer (born 1971)

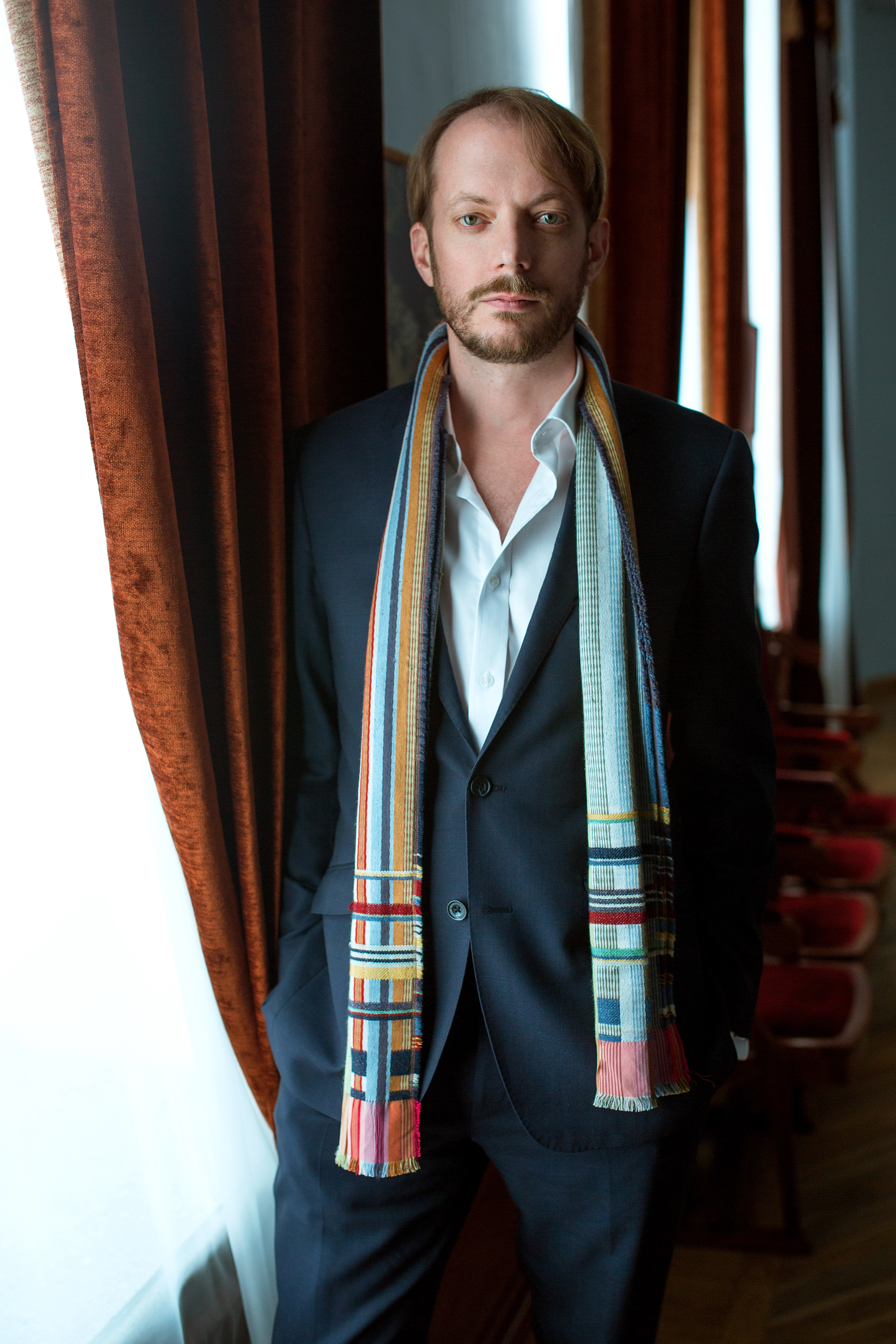
- Photo by Pavel Ogloblin for Perm Opera and Ballet Theatre (2005)
- Born: 1 March 1971 (age 55); Paris, France
- Occupations: Theatre manager, opera producer

Marc de Mauny (born 1 March 1971) is a French theatre manager and opera producer.

== Early life and education ==
De Mauny was born in Paris to British parents. His father, Erik de Mauny, was a BBC foreign correspondent who established the Moscow bureau of the BBC in the 1960s. Both paternal grandparents were professional musicians (his grandfather Leon de Mauny studied violin with Eugène Ysaÿe).

De Mauny went to school in France then to the Jesuit school Stonyhurst College, Lancashire. He read modern languages (French and Russian) at Pembroke College, Cambridge, graduating in 1994. De Mauny spent the academic year 1992–1993 studying singing and violin in Saint Petersburg, Russia, at the Saint Petersburg Conservatory.

== Career ==
From 1998 to 2000, de Mauny was arts officer at the British Council in Saint Petersburg. In this capacity, he was responsible for the arts programme of the 300th-anniversary celebrations of the Grand Embassy of Peter the Great.

In 1998, de Mauny founded the Saint Petersburg International Early Music Festival, together with violinist Andrei Reshetin as artistic director. De Mauny left the festival in 2007 to join Raiffeisenbank in Moscow as head of public relations in charge of sponsorship policy and philanthropy.

He returned to the arts sector in 2010 as director of development at the Mikhailovsky Theatre in Saint Petersburg. In 2011, de Mauny was appointed general manager of the Perm Opera and Ballet Theatre, located in Perm, working with artistic director Teodor Currentzis – and executive producer of the International Diaghilev Festival, a position he held until returning to France in 2015. From Paris, he managed the international touring activity of MusicAeterna, and residencies at the festivals of Aix-en-Provence, Salzburg and Ruhrtriennale.

In 2019, de Mauny set up a production company, Pont Neuf, Performing Fine Arts, which fosters creative collaborations between visual and performing artists. From 2020 to 2022, he was general director of the Festival Ravel in Saint-Jean-de-Luz, which he established together with Jean-François Heisser and Bertrand Chamayou.

== Personal life ==
De Mauny is married to artist Polina de Mauny. They have two children, Louis-Nicolai (born in Saint Petersburg in 2005) and Leon (born in Saint Petersburg in 2008).
