= Matthew Baker =

Matthew or Matt Baker may refer to:

== Entertainment ==
- Matt Baker (artist) (1921–1959), American comic book artist
- Matt Baker (born 1977), British television presenter
- Matthew Baker (bass-baritone), Australian bass-baritone opera singer
- Sergeant Matt Baker, fictional video game character
- Matt Baker (screenwriter), British television screenwriter

== Sports ==
- Mathew Baker (footballer) (born 2009), Indonesian footballer
- Matt Baker (horse trainer) (1955–2017), American racehorse trainer
- Matt Baker (footballer, born 1979), English former footballer
- Matt Baker (footballer, born 2003), Welsh footballer
- Matt Baker (American football) (born 1983), American football player
- Mashu Baker or Matthew Baker (born 1994), Japanese judoka

== Other ==
- Matthew Baker (governor) (died 1513), governor of Jersey (1486–1494)
- Matt E. Baker (born 1957), Pennsylvania politician
- Mathew Baker (1530–1613), Tudor shipwright
- Matt Baker (born c. 1974), founder of UsefulCharts

== See also ==
- Baker (surname)
