= Luke Leonard =

American theatre director (born 1975)

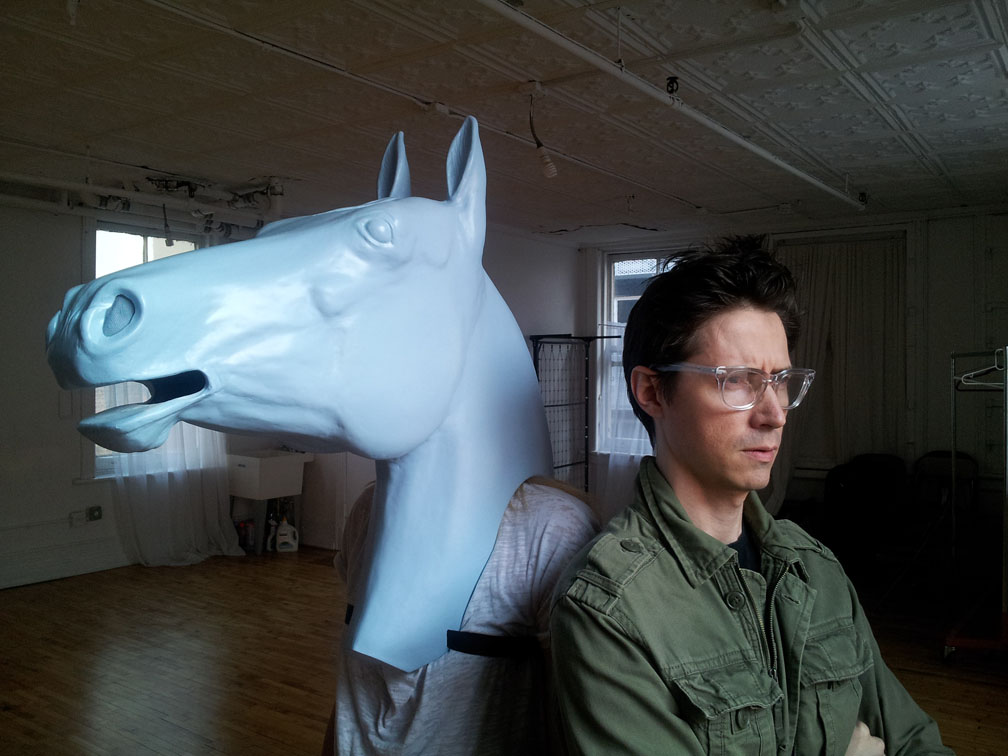
- Luke Leonard at La MaMa Great Jones Rehearsal Studios, New York, 2012
- Born: January 17, 1975 (age 51); Houston, Texas, USA
- Education: University of Texas at Austin (MFA); Brooklyn College (BFA)
- Occupations: theatre director, actor, artist
- Years active: 1996–present
- Website: lukeleonard.com

Luke Leonard (born January 17, 1975) is an American theatre director, designer, actor, playwright, and filmmaker. He is the founding artistic director of Monk Parrots, a New York City–based nonprofit that produces new theatre, music theatre, and opera.

== Life and career ==
Luke Landric Leonard was born and raised in Houston, Texas, where he attended Cypress Creek High School, played football, and acted in school plays. After his junior year, he left the football team to become president of Cy Creek's Theatre Department and focus solely on acting to prepare for college auditions. He studied theatre at Sam Houston State University before moving to New York City in 1995 to enroll in the BFA Acting Program at Brooklyn College, where he graduated in 1998.

1996–2001 Leonard was among the artists living and working in DUMBO, Brooklyn, where he founded DUMBO Theater eXchange (DTX) with Natalie Cook Leonard and Yukihiro Nishiyama. DTX presented new writers and directors in the downtown Brooklyn area, but closed amid gentrification. On December 15, 2000, Leonard and his wife were evicted from their loft on Water Street along with 60 other tenants. DTX presented about 30 productions and hosted theatre events for the 4th Annual DUMBO Arts Festival. Leonard also studied acting and directing with Joseph Chaikin and corresponded with him until Chaikin's death in 2003.

2002–2004 Michelle Moskowitz-Brown hired Leonard to create a theatre series for BRIC Studio (now BRIC Arts Media House). Leonard established Theater Nexus, a monthly series devoted to emerging and established theatre artists. Curated by S. Melinda Dunlap and Leonard, the series presented work by artists such as Mac Wellman, Young Jean Lee, Erin Courtney, and others. In 2003, Leonard became the father of actress Gates Leonard.

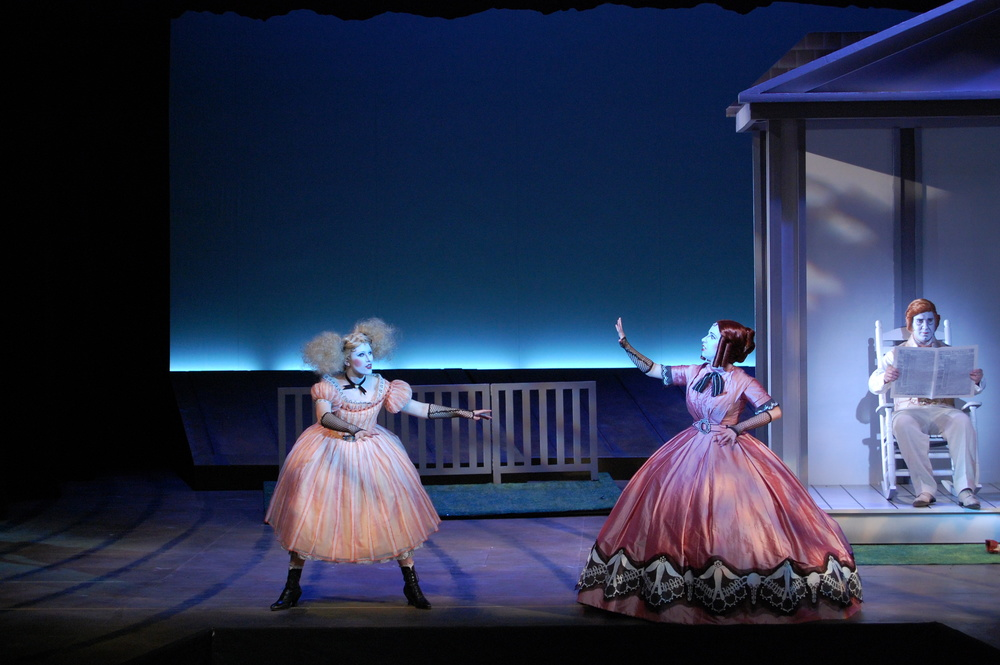
"Third Telling", a scene from David Lang and Mac Wellman's "The Difficulty of Crossing a Field", directed by Luke Leonard

2007–2010 During this period, DUMBO Theater eXchange (DTX) transitioned to the company name Monk Parrots. Leonard also completed his MFA in Directing at the University of Texas at Austin before returning to New York in 2010. In 2009, he worked with director Robert Wilson on Wilson’s production of Sonnets at the Berliner Ensemble. He also directed the Italian premiere of Israel Horovitz’s L’indiano vuole il Bronx. In 2010, Leonard directed the Texas premiere of David Lang and Mac Wellman’s The Difficulty of Crossing a Field at The University of Texas at Austin. In her review for the Austin American-Statesman, critic Jeanne Claire van Ryzin described the production as “deftly directed” and noted that Leonard and the creative team added “visually arresting layers” to the work.

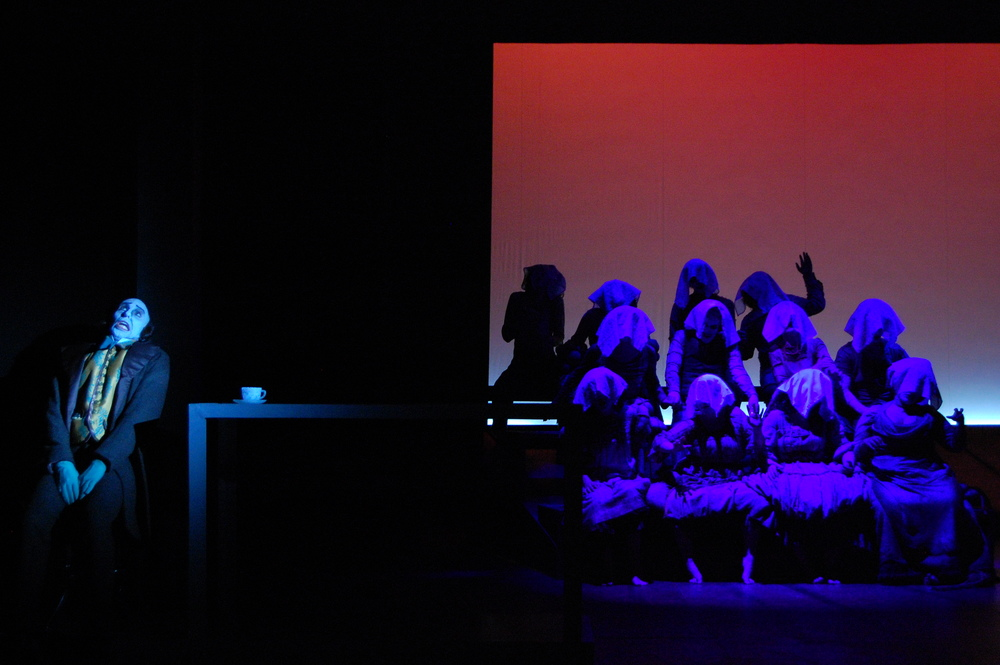
"Second Telling", a scene from David Lang and Mac Wellman's "The Difficulty of Crossing a Field", directed by Luke Leonard

2010–2012 Leonard returned to New York to resume his role as artistic director of Monk Parrots.

Monk Parrots produced Here I Go, written by David Todd, at 59E59 Theaters in 2012. Reviewer David Roberts described the show as “a brilliantly conceived and executed performance work that truly crosses artistic boundaries.”

2012–2014 The world premiere of Bum Phillips All-American Opera took place at La MaMa Experimental Theatre Club in 2014. The production was attended by members of the Phillips family and featured on NFL Films Presents. Coverage by *Texas Monthly* and *Sports Illustrated* discussed the opera’s conception and cultural impact.

2015–2016 Leonard worked as Resident International Stage Director for The Opera Studio Melbourne and directed The Difficulty of Crossing a Field for the inaugural Nagambie Lakes Opera Festival. He later directed The Scottish Opera, arranged by Peter Stopschinski, which premiered at the festival.

== Work ==
The following list includes selected stage and film productions directed or designed by Luke Leonard.

Opera

- The Difficulty of Crossing a Field, 2010 – Texas premiere, stage director and production designer.
- The Turn of the Screw, 2012 – Opera Moderne, New York; stage director and production designer.
- Bum Phillips, 2014 – world premiere, Monk Parrots/La MaMa Experimental Theatre Club, New York; stage director and production designer.
- Bum Phillips (opera), 2015 – Texas premiere.
- The Difficulty of Crossing a Field, 2015 – Australian premiere, stage director and production designer.
- The Scottish Opera, 2016 – world premiere, Nagambie Lakes Opera Festival, Australia.
- BMP: Next Generation, 2018 – Beth Morrison Projects, National Sawdust, stage director.
- The Dinner Party Operas, 2018 – American Opera Projects, Brooklyn Museum, stage director and designer.
- The Shepherdess and The Chimney Sweep, chamber opera by Hannah Lash, 2019 – American Opera Projects, SITE Santa Fe, stage director and designer.
- Macbeth (opera), 2019 – Yarra Valley Opera Festival, Australia, stage director and designer.

Theatre

- Desiderata, 1996 – writer/performer.
- Inside the State Hospital, 1997 – writer/performer.
- When We Sleep..., 1997 – writer/performer.
- Nil to Nigh, 1998 – writer/director/designer/performer.
- Bony & Poot, 2000 – writer/director/designer.
- Untitled, 1985, 2000 – writer/director/designer.
- Disposable Play No.2, 2000 – writer/director/designer.
- Broadway, 2000 – writer/director/designer.
- Movement Stolen From Joseph Chaikin’s "Firmament" That We’re Probably Doing Wrong Anyway, 2000 – writer/director/performer/designer.
- 50 ft of Film, 2001 – writer/director/designer/performer.
- Mac Wellman’s Mister Original Bugg, 2002 – director/designer.
- Performance Record #1, 2002 – writer/director/designer.
- Evil-in-Progress, 2002 – writer/director/designer.
- Wonder/Play, 2002 – writer/director/designer.
- Head/line, 2004 – director/designer/performer.
- Jeffrey M. Jones’ The Crazy Plays, 2004 – director/designer.
- Pitched, 2006 – director/designer.
- Our Lady of 121st Street, 2008 – director/designer.
- Bad Penny, 2008 – director.
- L’indiano vuole il Bronx, 2009 – director/lighting designer.
- The Art of Depicting Nature as It Is Seen by Toads, 2010 – concept/director/designer/performer.
- Gay Rodeo By-Laws, 2011 – writer/director/designer.
- Here I Go, 2012 – concept/director/designer.
- After an Earlier Incident, 2013 – concept/director/designer.
- Welcome to the Kingdom of Saudi Arabia, 2015 – writer/director/designer.

Film

- No-Account Film, 1999 – short, unreleased.
- Urchin, 2007 – feature; cinematographer.
- Antiquated Play, 2007 – short, unreleased.
- Follow Me Down, 2017 – feature (pre-production).
- love fail (opera film), 2020 – short film; director/designer/editor.

== See also ==
- Experimental theatre
- Devised theatre
- Postdramatic theatre
