= MusicAeterna =

Russian orchestra and choir founded by Teodor Currentzis

musicAeterna
- Orchestra / Choir
- Former name: The New Siberian Singers (Choir)
- Founded: 2004
- Location: Saint Petersburg
- Music director: Teodor Currentzis
- Website: musicaeterna.org

musicAeterna (or Musica Aeterna; from Latin musica aeterna 'eternal music') is an orchestra and choir based in Saint Petersburg. The ensemble was founded by conductor Teodor Currentzis and is known for its historically informed performances and stylistic diversity, ranging from early to contemporary classical music.

== History ==
=== Formation and Novosibirsk period (2004–2011) ===
musicAeterna was founded in 2004 when Greek-born conductor Teodor Currentzis was appointed senior conductor of the Novosibirsk Opera and Ballet Theatre. Working with chief choirmaster Vyacheslav Podyelsky, Currentzis established a choir, initially called The New Siberian Singers, as well as the musicAeterna orchestra. The first line-up of the ensemble featured 39 musicians in the orchestra and 27 singers in the choir.

The ensemble made its debut on January 31, 2005, performing works by Couperin, Tchaikovsky, Cavalieri, Ives, Bach, and Pärt alongside fragments from Purcell's Dido and Aeneas, Mozart's Requiem, and Brahms's German Requiem. Their first full opera production was Dido and Aeneas in March 2005.

Early achievements included their international debut at the ACT New Russian Arts Festival in London in November 2005, performing Dido and Aeneas and Shostakovich's Symphony No. 14, as well as a 2006 production of Prokofiev's Cinderella, which earned Currentzis his first Golden Mask award.

In 2008, the ensemble began recording for Outhere Music's Alpha label, starting with Dido and Aeneas.

musicAeterna gained international recognition for their historically informed performances, particularly their production of the Mozart–Da Ponte trilogy, which was performed using period instruments.

=== Perm period (2011–2019) ===
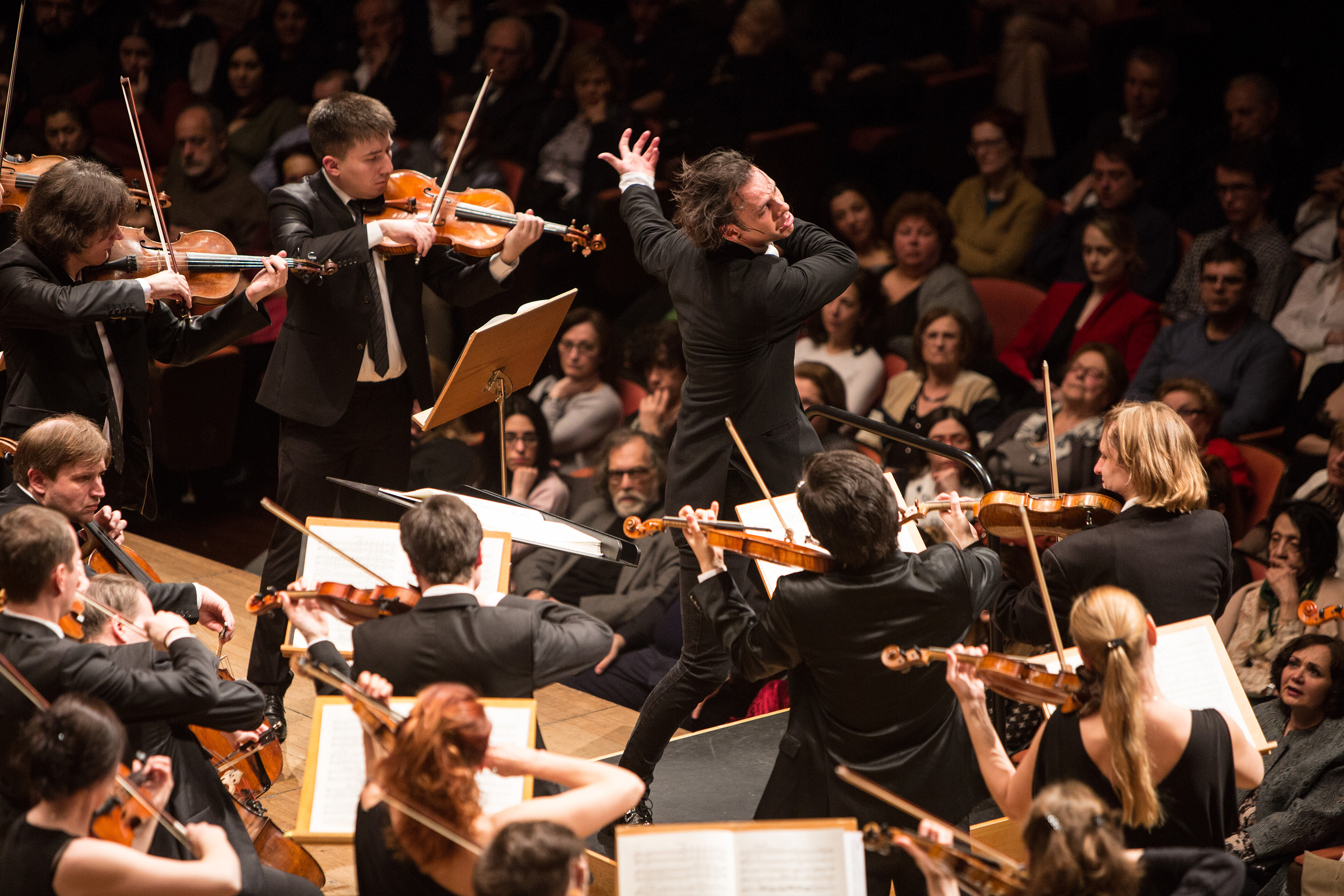
Teodor Currentzis and musicAeterna (2017)

In 2011, Currentzis was named music director of the Perm Opera and Ballet Theatre, moving the more than 100 musicians of musicAeterna with him to Perm, where the ensemble became part of the theatre. During this time, musicAeterna built an international reputation through European tours and festival appearances.

Since 2013, the ensemble has made several recordings for the Sony Classical label, beginning with a collection of pieces by Rameau.

They became the first Russian ensemble to open the Salzburg Festival in 2017, performing Mozart's Requiem and a production of Mozart's La clemenza di Tito directed by Peter Sellars.

In 2018, the orchestra made its debut at the BBC Proms with two of Beethoven's symphonies, and returned to the Salzburg Festival with the complete symphony cycle.

=== Saint Petersburg period (since 2019) ===
In June 2019, Currentzis stepped down as music director of Perm's theatre, and musicAeterna embarked on a new phase of its development as a privately sponsored independent institution under his leadership. The ensemble established its new headquarters at Dom Radio in Saint Petersburg, where they created an interdisciplinary cultural and educational centre.

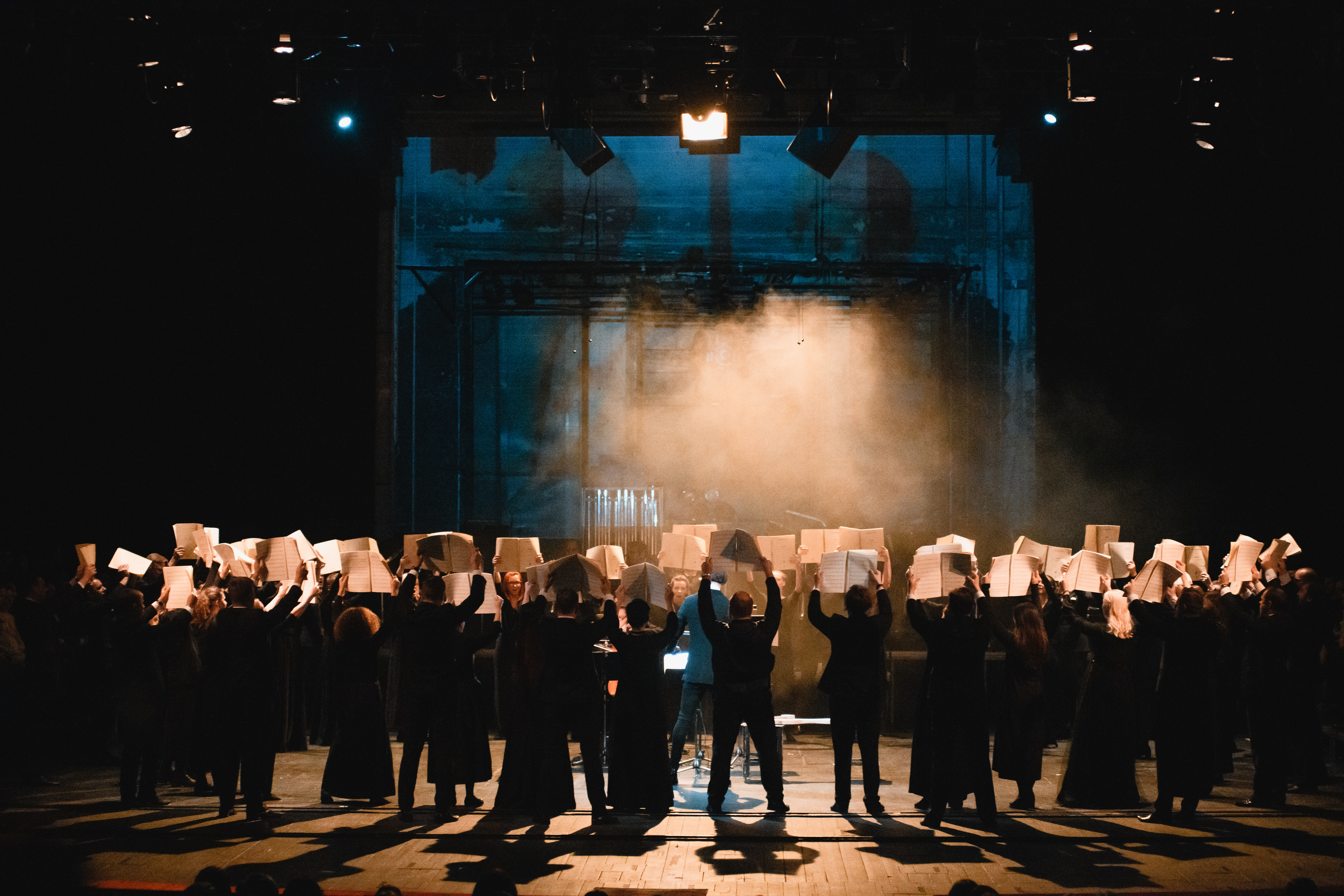
musicAeterna choir performing Philippe Hersant's Tristia (2018)

In the meantime, musicAeterna had expanded to include two new ensembles: musicAeterna byzantina, a choir specialising in Byzantine sacred music formed in 2018; and musicAeterna Dance, a dance company founded in 2022.

musicAeterna continued to perform at major festivals, including the Salzburg Festival, where it was a regular participant from 2017 to 2022.

At the end of 2019, the ensemble made its American debut at The Shed in New York, performing Verdi's Requiem. According to New York Times critic Zachary Woolfe, the concert was one of the highlights of the year. In the same month, Currentzis conducted Verdi's Requiem with the Berlin Philharmonic together with the musicAeterna choir.

== Awards ==
Echo Klassik

- 2014: Award for Mozart: Le nozze di Figaro
- 2016: Award for Stravinsky: Le Sacre du printemps
- 2017: Award for Purcell: The Indian Queen

Diapason d'or

- 2017: Award for Tchaikovsky: Symphony No. 6

Preis der deutschen Schallplattenkritik

- 2015: Nominated for Mozart: Così fan tutte
- 2016: Nominated for Tchaikovsky: Violin Concerto; Stravinsky: Les Noces
- 2017: Nominated for Mozart: Don Giovanni
- 2019: Nominated for Mahler: Symphony No. 6
- 2020: Nominated for Beethoven: Symphony No. 5
- 2021: Nominated for Beethoven: Symphony No. 7

Edison Classical Music Award

- 2014: Nominated for Mozart: Le nozze di Figaro
- 2015: Nominated for Mozart: Così fan tutte
- 2017: Award for Mozart: Don Giovanni
- 2018: Award for Tchaikovsky: Symphony No. 6
- 2019: Award for Mahler: Symphony No. 6
- 2020: Nominated for Beethoven: Symphony No. 5
- 2021: Nominated for Beethoven: Symphony No. 7
