= Bum Phillips (opera) =

2014 opera

- Opera by Peter Stopschinski
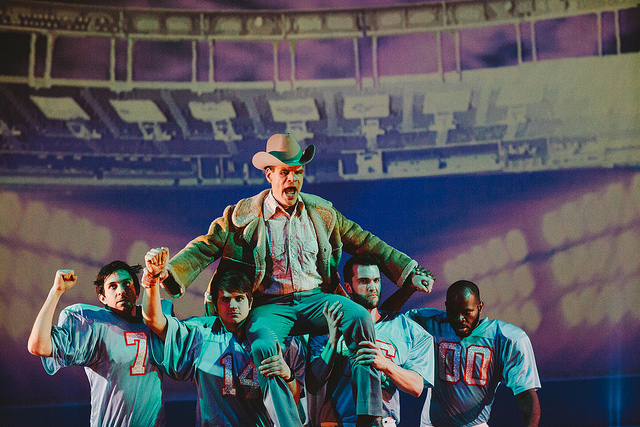
- Gary Ramsey as Bum in the world premiere in 2014
- Librettist: Kirk Lynn
- Language: English
- Based on: Bum Phillips: Coach, Cowboy, Christian (2010) by Bum Phillips
- Premiere: 15 March 2014; La MaMa Experimental Theatre Club, New York

Bum Phillips is an opera in two acts by American composer Peter Stopschinski. Kirk Lynn wrote the English language libretto based on Bum Phillips' 2010 memoirs Bum Phillips: Coach, Cowboy, Christian. The opera was conceived by theater director Luke Leonard and commissioned by Monk Parrots, Inc. as described in a 2014 Sports on Earth article titled "A Night at the Bum Phillips Opera".

== Performance history ==
- February 2013 – Workshop performance of act 1 produced by Post Theatre Company at Long Island University-Post and La MaMa Experimental Theatre Club.
- March 15–30, 2014 – World premiere in the Ellen Stewart Theatre at La MaMa Experimental Theatre Club in New York. The performance was attended by former NFL players and Houston Oilers, Dan Pastorini and Lawrence Harris, and Bum Phillips' son and NFL coach, Wade Phillips. It was conducted by Peter Stopschinski, performed by American Modern Ensemble, and directed and designed by Luke Leonard. Dan Pastorini reacted, "Bum Phillips and opera don't belong in the same sentence ... And I sat there and I watched this thing unfold for two hours, and at the end of it I had tears coming down my cheeks," and Wade Phillips responded, "It certainly meant a lot to us. Meant a lot to me ... Not many people get a tribute to them in any way and this opera did it for us."
- September 24, 2015 – Benefit performance produced by Dan Pastorini Charity at the Stafford Centre in Stafford, Texas. The performance was introduced by Dan Pastorini and attended by NFL players Earl Campbell, Billy Johnson, Ken Burrough, Robert Brazile, and others.

== Roles ==
Roles, voice types, premiere cast
Role	Voice type	Premiere cast, 15 March 2014 Conductor: Peter Stopschinski
Bum Phillips	baritone	Gary Ramsey
Debbie Phillips	mezzo-soprano	Alison Bolshoi
Mom	soprano	Anna Noggle
Clara Lynn (Adult)	soprano	Chelsea Burris
Three TV Announcers: Color 1, Play–by–play, Color 2	soprano, mezzo-soprano, tenor	Jessie Dean, Briana Hunter, Victor Khodadad
Daughter	soprano	Megan Lalley
Bud Adams/Dad	bass-baritone	John Smiley
Earl Campbell	bass	Anlami Shaw
Gifford Nielsen	tenor	Hunter Frederick
Mike Barber	tenor	Patrick Mulryan
Clara Lynn (Child)	alto	Gates Leonard
Dan Pastorini/Mike Renfro	actor	Joey LePage
Ken Burrough	actor	Emmanuel Elpenord
Ensemble/Chorus: Townspeople of Orange, Texas, Phillips women, referee, Oilers fans, Derrick Doll, prisoners, Jesus

== Instrumentation ==
The work is scored for one violin, one bass, two French horns, one drummer, percussion, and two pianos (one Fender Rhodes).
