= Perm Opera and Ballet Theatre =

Theatre in Perm, Russia

The Perm Tchaikovsky Opera and Ballet Theatre
- Пермский театр оперы и балета имени П. И. Чайковского

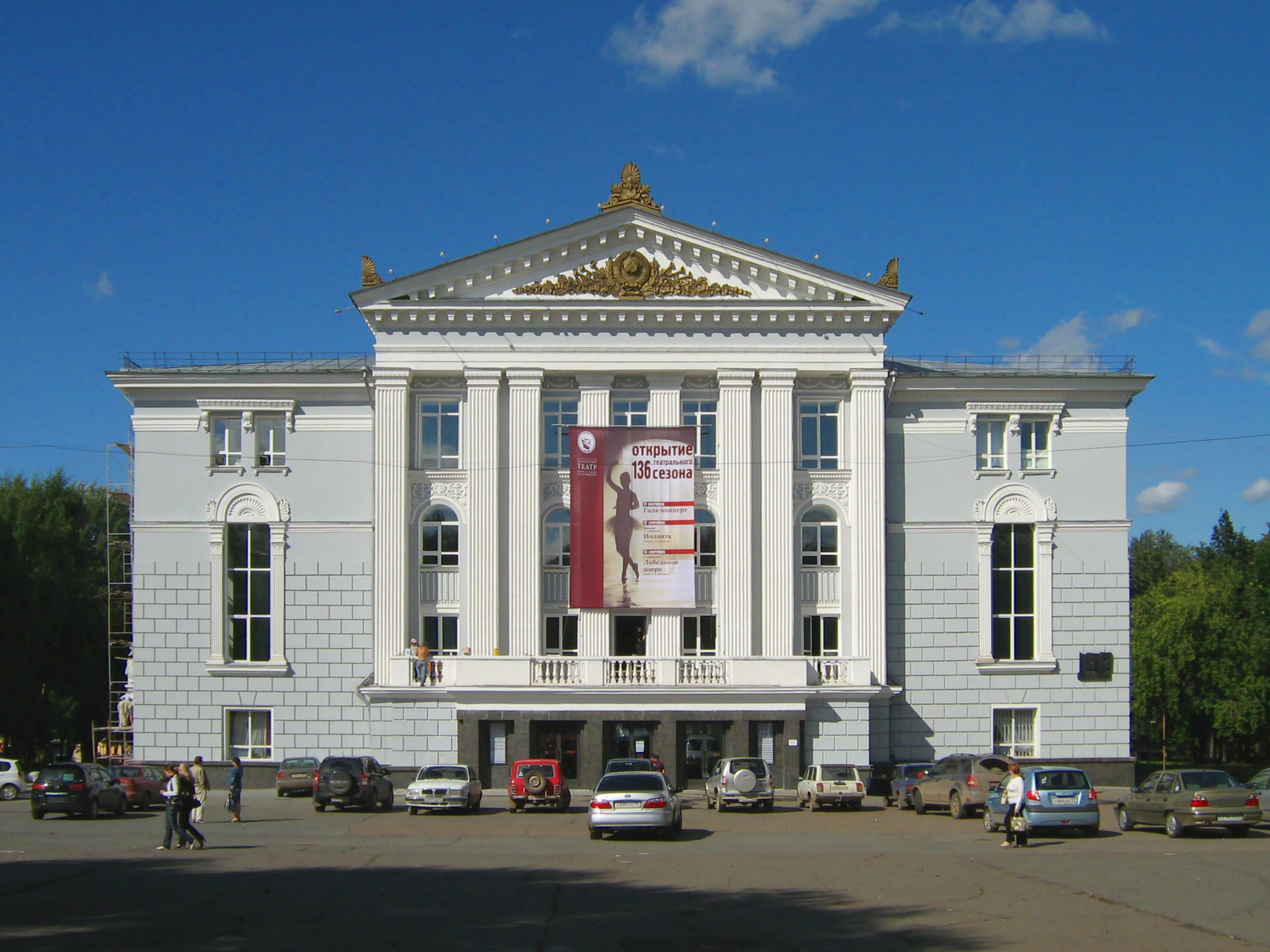
- The opera in 2007
- Interactive map of The Perm Tchaikovsky Opera and Ballet Theatre
- Address: Petropavlovskaya st. 25A; Perm; Russia
- Coordinates: 58.015975°N 56.246052°E

Construction
- Opened: 1874–1879
- Rebuilt: 1959
- Years active: since 1870
- Architect: Rudolf Karvovsky

Website
- permopera.ru/en/

The Perm Tchaikovsky Opera and Ballet Theatre is an opera and ballet theatre in the city of Perm in Russia. It is one of the oldest theatres in the country, and it has remained a major musical centre during its history, in which many significant art events have taken place. Its ballet troupe is one of the most important in Russia.

The theatre is often named "Tchaikovsky's House", and all stage works of Pyotr Ilyich Tchaikovsky, who was born in the region, are presented in its repertoire: 10 operas and 3 ballets. Festivals of Tchaikovsky's works were notable cultural events of the country.

== History ==
The theatre was inaugurated on 24 November 1870 with the premiere performance being Mikhail Glinka's A Life for the Tsar. The building was constructed from 1874 to 1879, after which the first performance took place in the winter of 1879/1880.

A new epoch in the history of the theatre started in 1896. It received the patronage of the city duma, which decided to finance the theatre and the opera troupe from the city budget. A board of directors was elected for managing the theatre and inviting the artists. The first season after the end of the Civil War opened on 20 August 1921.

During World War II, when the Leningrad State Academic Theatre of Opera and Ballet evacuated its personnel to the city, its performances were given in the Perm theatre. The artists from Leningrad worked in Perm for three winters and two summers.

In 1956, the Perm theatre was renamed in honor of Pyotr Ilyich Tchaikovsky and given Academy status in 1969.

=== Awards ===
The artists of the theatre have received the Golden Mask Award for many performances:

- 1996: Don Pasquale for Best Actor and Best Actress
- 1998: The Queen of Spades for Best Set Design
- 2004: Ballet Imperial for Best Ballet
- 2009: L'Orfeo for Best Set Design and Best Stage Direction
- 2010: One Day in the Life of Ivan Denisovich for Best Conductor's Work
- 2012: To See The Music Special Award of the Musical Theatre Jury
- 2013: Così fan tutte for Best Opera Director
- 2013: Medeamaterial for Best Opera Actress

== Opera ==
Many opera premieres in Russia were given in this theatre. The theatre held the first festival in the 20th Century of the Russian composer Sergei Prokofiev's work, where it opened with a two-evening version of the opera War and Peace.

== Ballet ==
There is a tradition of collaboration with directors and choreographers from Germany, United States, Spain, and Switzerland on the Perm stage. Projects between Russia and United States in collaboration with The George Balanchine Foundation and The Jerome Robbins Foundation have added works by 20th-century choreographers to the repertoire of the theatre. The theatre has also been a venue for artists who have achieved recognition outside of Russia.

== Events ==
Arabesque is a ballet competition headed by Vladimir Vasiliev, which has taken place in Perm since 1990. More than 650 young ballet artists from Russia, former republics of the USSR, Austria, Argentina, Bulgaria, Belarus, China, Croatia, Egypt, Ireland, Japan, Mexico, Mongolia, Slovenia, South Korea, Turkey, United States and Venezuela have participated in it.

International festivals known as the "Diaghilev Seasons: Perm-Petersburg-Paris" have become some of the most visible events in the cultural life of Russia. The festival has taken place in the theatre every two years since 2003.

=== Concert tours ===
The ballet troupe performs abroad under the name of The Tchaikovsky Ballet. Promotion of the opera troupe in the United States began with a performance of Mazeppa in Carnegie Hall in January 2008 using the name The Tchaikovsky Theatre.

== Arts management ==
- Teodor Currentzis – art director
- Marc de Mauny – general manager
- Galina Polushkina – executive director
- Valery Platonov – general conductor
- Alexey Miroshnichenko – general ballet master
- Vitaly Polonsky – general choirmaster

== Building ==
- Auditorium: 972 seats
- Orchestra pit: 50 seats
- Stage: height 21.5 m, width 18 m, depth 14 m
- Proscenium arch: height 8.5 m, width 12 m

== Gallery ==
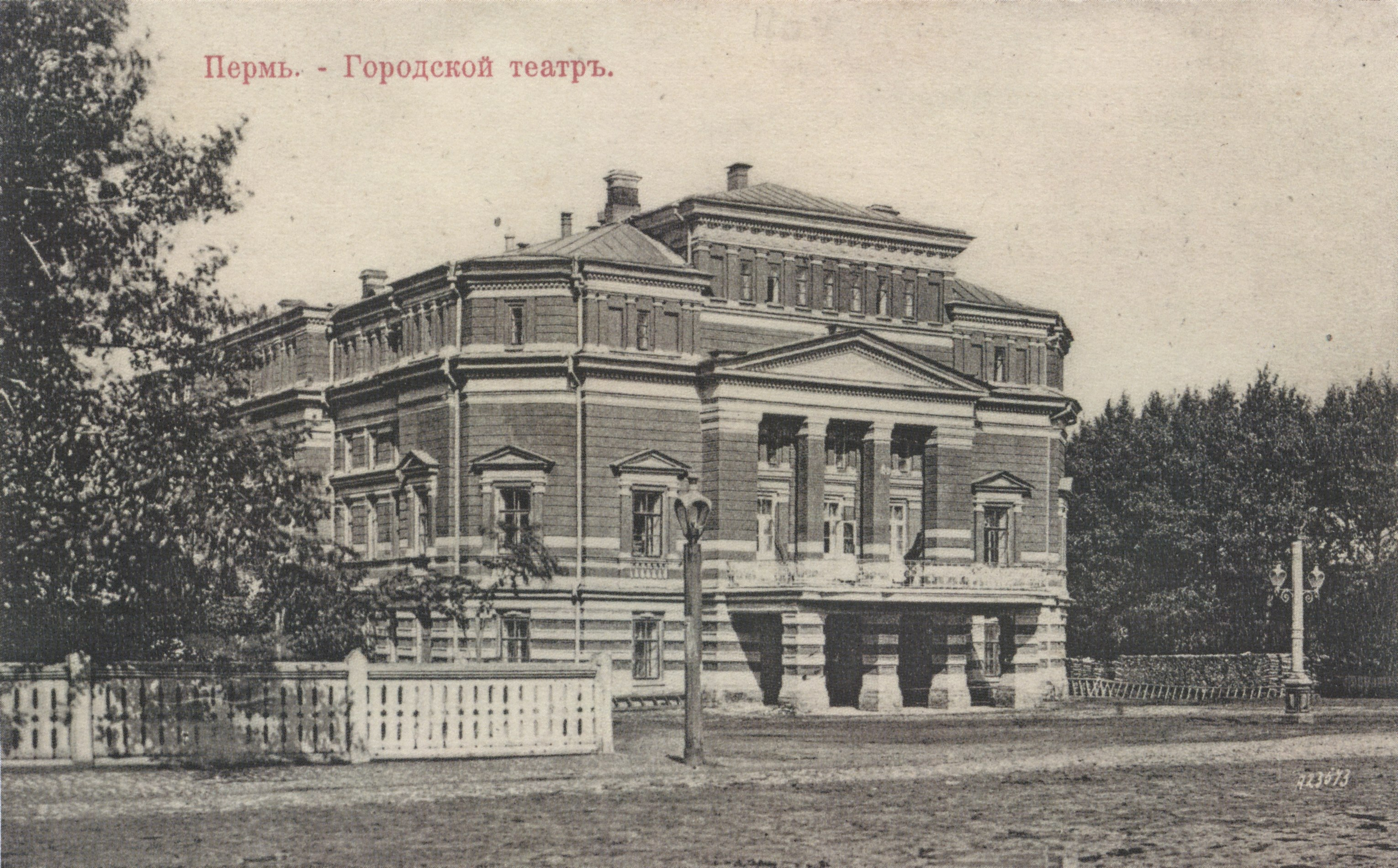
The theatre in early 20th-century
