= Erik de Mauny =

English journalist and author

Erik Cecil Leon de Mauny
- Born: 17 September 1920; London, England
- Died: 18 March 1997 (aged 76); Lancaster, England
- Occupations: Journalist; Author
- Known for: BBC's first Moscow correspondent

Erik Cecil Leon de Mauny (17 September 1920 – 18 March 1997) was an English journalist, author, and the BBC's first Moscow correspondent, working for them there from 1963, and as a foreign correspondent in other countries.

== Early life ==
Erik de Mauny was born in London on 17 September 1920, to professional musicians.

He obtained a degree in Russian at the School of Slavonic Studies. He worked for the BBC from 1949, in External Services News (1949–1955), as foreign duty editor (1955–1958), correspondent in Vienna and Balkans (1958), Middle East (based in Beirut, 1958–1960), and Washington, D.C. (1960–1963). He reported from Cuba following the Bay of Pigs episode.

== Moscow ==
The BBC had been attempting to secure permission from the USSR to base a correspondent in Moscow since at least World War II but had always been rebuffed. They received permission in 1963 under the era of Nikita Khrushchev's presidency.

The following year, de Mauny secured an interview with the exiled spy, Kim Philby, confirming the latter's presence in Moscow, and covered the fall of Khrushchev.

While in the USSR, his activities were severely limited. He was required to obtain permission to travel more than a few miles outside Moscow. To communicate with London he had to book telephone lines hours in advance. The bookings were not always honoured.

He moved from Moscow to the BBC's Paris bureau in 1966. He returned as the Moscow correspondent in 1972. In 1974, he reported the arrest of Alexander Solzhenitsyn, writer and dissident.

== Later career ==
de Mauny finally left Moscow in 1974. He was a BBC Foreign Duty Editor (1974–1977) and then Special Correspondent for working for Radio 4's The World Tonight (1977–1980).

== Personal life ==
de Mauny married Denyse Aghion, a Jewish Egyptian, in 1950; the marriage was annulled and dissolved in 1969. The annulment allowed de Mauny, a convert to Catholicism, to marry a Roman Catholic journalist, Elizabeth Mary Lois Bower, a daughter of Commander Robert Tatton Bower, Conservative MP for Cleveland.

The couple's son, Marc de Mauny (born 1971), is a musician who studied at St Petersburg Conservatory and as of 2013 was general manager and executive producer of the Perm Opera and Ballet Theatre in Russia. They also had a daughter. Both children were born in France, where the couple initially lived after retirement.

Erik de Mauny died in Lancaster on 18 March 1997.

== Bibliography ==
- —— (1969). Russian Prospect. Macmillan. ISBN 9780333071564.
- —— (1949). The Huntsmen in His Career. Trollope Press. ISBN 978-1447412540.
- —— (1948). Portrait of an Anti-Semite. Secker & Warburg/Lindsay Drummond. ASIN B0007J5DQ0., translator
- Réflexions sur la question juive
- Jean-Paul Sartre, Portrait of the Anti-Semite, translated by Erik de Mauny. Secker & Warburg, 1948.
- (Editor) Middle East Anthology of Prose and Verse, L. Drummond, 1946
- Anatol Goldberg, Ilya Ehrenburg – Revolutionary, Novelist, Poet, War Correspondent, Propagandist: The Extraordinary Epic of a Russian Survivor. Edited and introduced by Erik de Mauny. 1984
- Andre Dupeyrat, Festive Papua: The Story of the Great Dance in Papua New Guinea, translated by Erik De Mauny. 1956
- Moreux, Serge. 1953. Béla Bartók, translated G. S. Fraser and Erik de Mauny. London: The Harvill Press.
- Allotte de la Fuÿe, Marguerite (1956), Jules Verne, sa vie, son oeuvre, translated by Erik de Mauny, New York: Coward-McCann
- The Universal Singular: The Autobiography of Pierre Emmanuel (trans. Erik de Mauny), Grey Walls Press: London (1950)
- Return to Oasis: War Poems and Recollections from the Middle East, 1940–1946 (1980) edited with Victor Selwyn, Erik de Mauny, Ian Fletcher, and John Waller.

de Mauny also wrote an unpublished autobiography, Shouting Through the Static. He wrote regular reviews for the Times Literary Supplement.
