= Novosibirsk Opera and Ballet Theatre =

Novosibirsk State Academic Opera and Ballet Theatre building

Coordinates: 55°1′50″N 82°55′28″E

Novosibirsk State Academic Opera and Ballet Theater
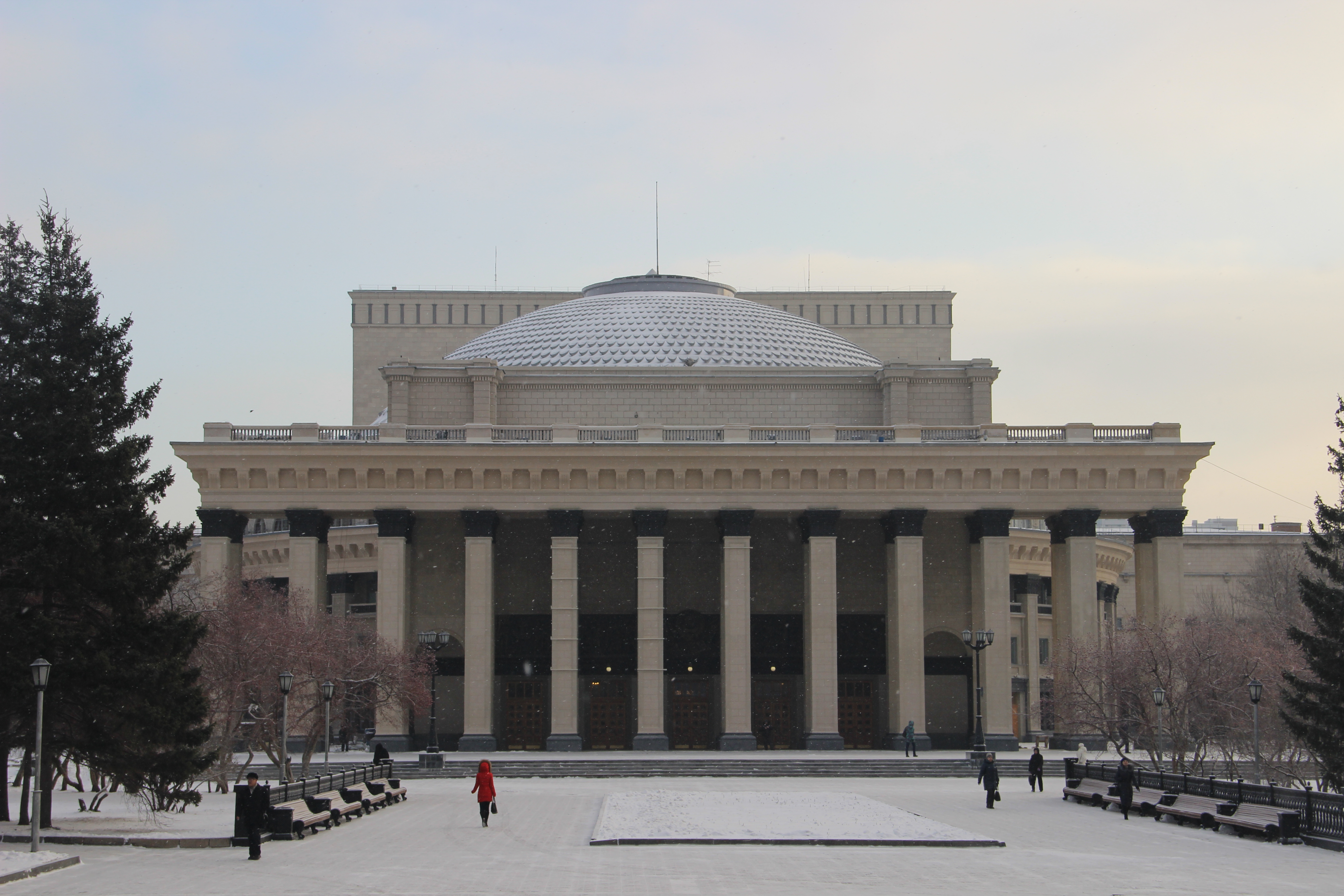
- Interactive map of Novosibirsk State Academic Opera and Ballet Theater
- Location: Krasny Avenue, Novosibirsk, Russia

Website
- novat.ru

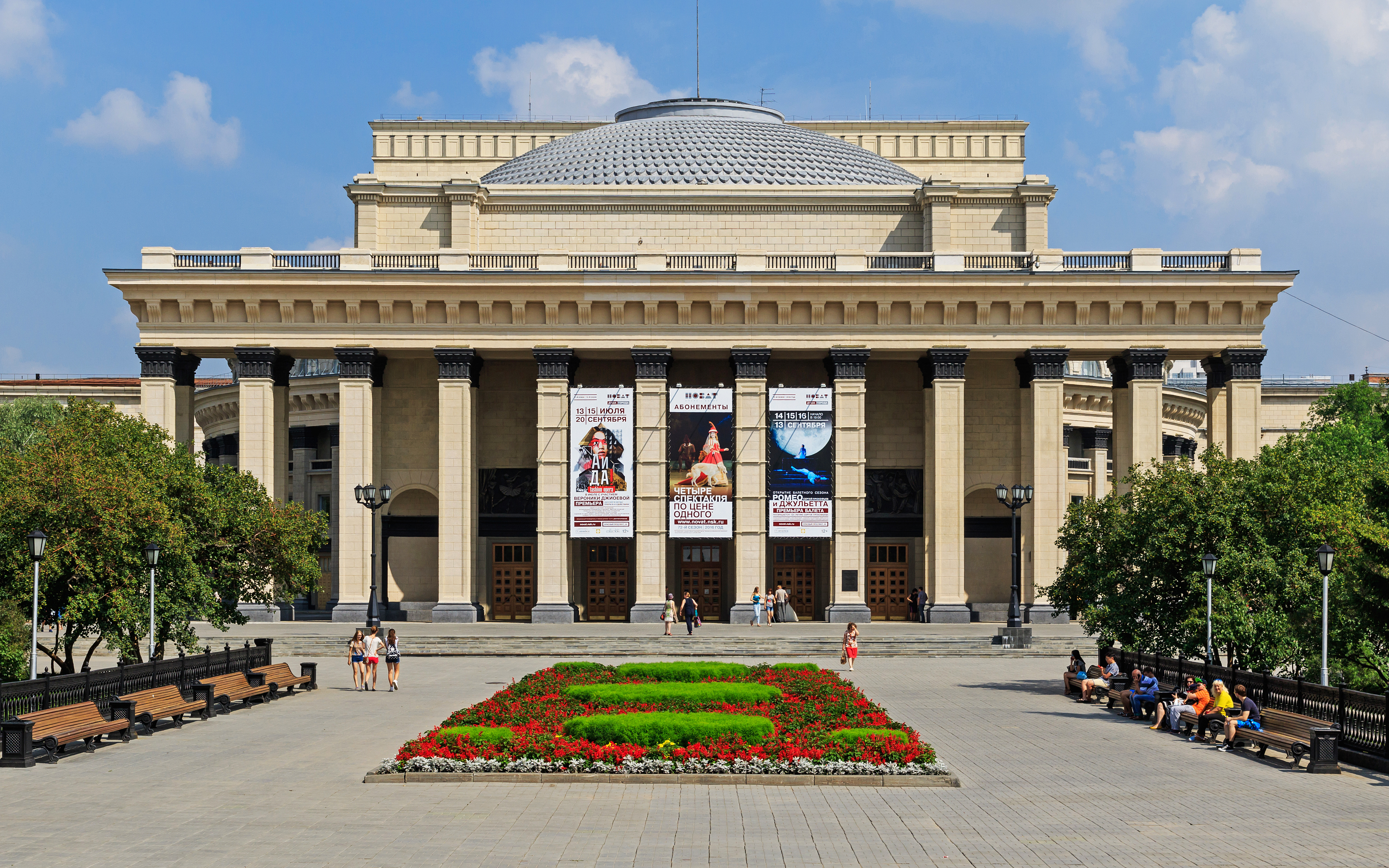
The theatre front in 2016

The Novosibirsk Opera and Ballet Theatre, officially the Novosibirsk State Academic Opera and Ballet Theatre (Russian: Новосибирский государственный академический театр оперы и балета), is a theatre in Novosibirsk and Siberia. It is located at the center of Novosibirsk at Lenin square.

The building was completed in February 1944, and the first performance was held on 12 May 1945. As of 2012, it is the largest theatre in Russia, larger than the Bolshoi Theatre (literally "Big theatre") in Moscow.

The theater also served as the fifth Pit Stop in the fourteenth season of The Amazing Race.

== Architecture ==
This theater is physically the largest in the world. It is located on the main square of Novosibirsk. After the reconstruction in 2005 Novosibirsk Theater is the most well-equipped in Russia.

The building consists of ten parts: the building in which the cash register and lobby on the ground floor, the concert hall on second and third floors, cylindrical form of the auditorium (with circular foyers); a stage block with a depth of 30 meters and grates with a height of 29.5 meters. Adjacent to the stage are the side wings, which house the backstage, administrative premises, rehearsal halls, costume and decoration workshops. A semi-cylinder of the scenery warehouse is adjacent to the stage box at the back. The principal construction of the theatre building is the big dome, which is 60 metres (200 ft) wide and 35 metres (115 ft) high.

Big hall accommodates 1 774 viewers, concert hall – 375, small hall – 150.

Total area of the rooms is 40 663 m^{2}, size of the building is 294 340 m^{3}.

== Music directors ==
Current music director is Mikhail Tatarnikov. Previous directors were Dmitri Jurowski (2015–2023), Ainars Rubikis (2011–2015) and Teodor Currentzis (2004–2010).
