= Matthew Baker (bass-baritone) =

Australian bass-baritone

- Born: Sydney, Australia
- Genres: Classical, Opera, Early Music, Oratorio
- Occupation: Baritone singer
- Instrument: Vocals
- Website: www.matthewbaker.nl

Matthew Baker is an Australian bass-baritone who specialises in the performance of early music and Baroque operas and oratorios.

Matthew Baker was born in Sydney and received his BA in Medieval Studies from the University of Sydney in 1997. After serving as a Lay Vicar in the choir of St. Patrick's Cathedral, Dublin, he studied early music vocal performance at the Royal Conservatory of The Hague, receiving a Master of Music degree in 2005. That same year he sang the role of Sylvandre in a production of André Campra's L'Europe galante conducted by William Christie which toured to cities in France and Spain. He sang the roles of Giove and Nettuno in the first modern performance of Gioseffo Zamponi's 1650 opera Ulisse all Isola di Circe at the Festival Printemps Baroque du Sablon (Spring Festival of Baroque at the Sablon) in Brussels in 2006. In 2006, he also won the Handel's Messiah Bass Arias prize in the 12th Concorso Internazionale di Canto Solistico of the Fondazione Seghizzi in Gorizia.

Matthew Baker is currently a core musician at The Netherlands Bach Society
