= Teodor Currentzis =

Greek conductor, musician and actor

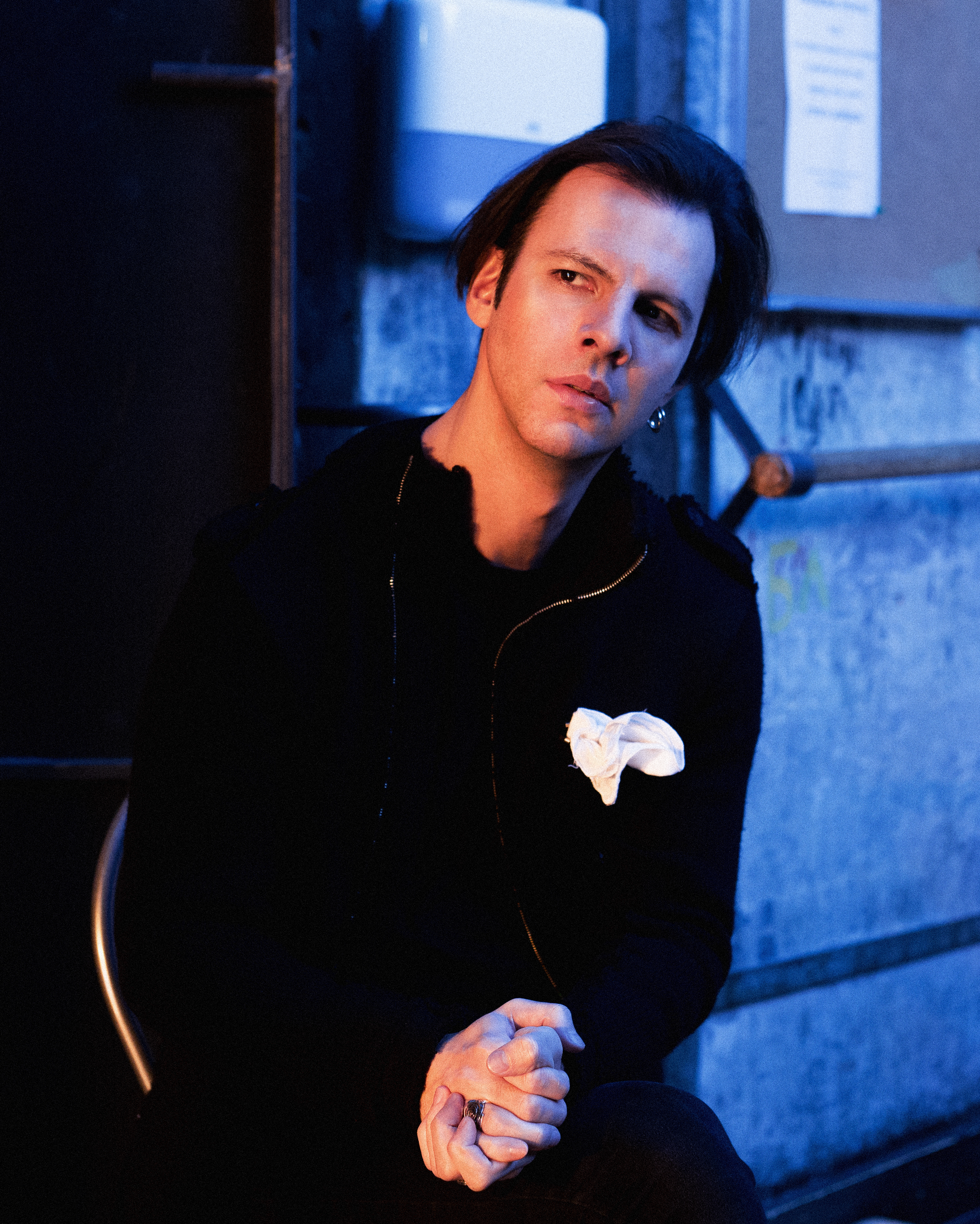
- Currentzis at the Perm Opera, 2015
- Born: 24 February 1972 (age 54); Athens, Greece
- Citizenship: Greece; Russia
- Occupations: Conductor; composer; actor; recording artist
- Style: Classical music
- Website: www.teodor-currentzis.com

Teodor Currentzis (Greek: Θεόδωρος Κουρεντζής [θeˈoðɔros kurenˈdzis]; Russian: Теодoр Курeнтзис; born 24 February 1972) is a Greek and Russian conductor, musician and actor. He is artistic director of the ensembles musicAeterna and Utopia and was chief conductor of the SWR Symphonieorchester from 2018 to 2025.

== Biography ==
Currentzis was born in Athens, and at the age of four began to take piano lessons. At age seven, he began violin lessons. He entered the National Conservatory, Athens at the age of twelve, in the violin department. In 1987, aged fifteen he began composition studies under Professor George Hadjinikos, and then in 1989 under Professor B. Shreck. From 1994 to 1999, Currentzis studied conducting supported by a scholarship from the Alexander S. Onassis Public Benefit Foundation in the St. Petersburg State Conservatory with Ilya Musin.

From 2004 to 2010, Currentzis served as principal conductor of the Novosibirsk Opera and Ballet Theatre, where in 2004 he founded the musicAeterna orchestra and later the musicAeterna choir. In 2009, Currentzis acted in Ilya Khrzhanovsky's film Dau (Russian: Дау) based on the biography of the physicist Lev Landau. In February 2011, Currentzis became music director of the Perm Opera and Ballet Theatre, to which he brought both of his musicAeterna ensembles.

In 2011, Currentzis became principal guest conductor of the Southwest German Radio Symphony Orchestra. Effective with the 2018–2019 season Currentzis became the first chief conductor of the SWR Symphonieorchester (created by the merger of the Southwest German Radio Symphony Orchestra with the Stuttgart Radio Symphony Orchestra). In September 2021, the SWR announced a 3-year extension to Currentzis' contract. In September 2022, the SWR announced that Currentzis was to stand down as chief conductor of the SWR Symphonieorchester at the close of the 2024–2025 season. The contract was not renewed upon his own request, and not for political reasons "as some had speculated or hoped".

== Impact of the Russian invasion of Ukraine ==
Following the 2022 Russian invasion of Ukraine, Currentzis faced public scrutiny and had concerts cancelled in Europe due to his professional activities in Russia and his lack of a public stance on the war. His ensemble musicAeterna has been supported by the state-owned VTB Bank since 2019. In April 2022, a benefit concert entitled "A Symbol of Hope and Peace" was due to take place in aid of those in need in Ukraine, and Currentzis and his ensemble were set to perform. The Vienna Konzerthaus canceled the concert the day before, insisting that the ensemble secure "independent funding." In June 2022, VTB chief Andrey Kostin stated during the St. Petersburg International Economic Forum that Currentzis had met with him following the invasion and expressed his intention to remain in Russia.

Currentzis has defended his refusal to issue a political statement. Arguing that politicians seek to instrumentalize artists for propaganda, he stated that musicians "have no flags" and his mission is to unite people through music rather than divide them. In a 2025 interview with Der Spiegel, he expressed frustration at the pressure to publicly denounce the invasion and asserted his fundamental "right to silence". His ensemble's manager, Ilja Chakhov, further defended this position and stated that Currentzis chose to remain in Russia out of loyalty to his life's work, the ensemble musicAeterna and its 250 musicians, "several of whom had been with the ensemble for twenty years."

Some European cultural venues and festivals cancelled scheduled performances or declined to host performances by Currentzis and his ensembles. In January 2023, the Kölner Philharmonie cancelled a concert, stating that months into the conflict, they expected Currentzis to issue a clear statement on the political situation. Similar cancellations occurred in Munich, Paris, and Hamburg that same year. In contrast, other European institutions, including the Salzburg Festival, chose to continue hosting Currentzis. In February 2024, the Wiener Festwochen cancelled a performance by Currentzis after Ukrainian conductor Oksana Lyniv refused to perform as part of the same festival programme as Currentzis.

In June 2024, it was reported that VTB intended to finance the construction of a new concert hall in Saint Petersburg, which was to serve as a venue for musicAeterna.

By 2026, the debates surrounding Currentzis's political ties have become less heated, and he retains a group of European promoters who continue to organize his concerts at major venues such as the Elbphilharmonie in Hamburg and the Isarphilharmonie in Munich.

== Critical reception ==
Currentzis has the image of a punk "messiah and rebel," wearing lace-up boots, skinny jeans and a T-shirt on stage. He has been labeled eccentric for conducting from within the orchestra, leaving his stand. However, as of 2022 he has chosen to take on more traditional dress, appearing in black suits with white cuffed shirts, elegant evening shoes and a neat haircut.

== Awards ==
Currentzis has won the Russian national theatre award Golden Mask nine times:

- 2007: Special Award of the Musical Theatre Jury for Prokofiev's Cinderella.
- 2008: Special Award of the Musical Theatre Jury For Impressive Achievements in Musical Authenticity in Mozart's Le Nozze di Figaro.
- 2011: Best Conductor of an opera for Berg's Wozzeck at the Bolshoi Theatre.
- 2013: Best Conductor of an opera for Mozart's Così fan tutte
- 2013: Best Conductor of a ballet for Prokofiev's Chout
- 2015: Best Conductor of an opera for Purcell's The Indian Queen
- 2017: Best Conductor of an opera for Verdi's La Traviata
- 2018: Best Conductor of a ballet for Prokofiev's Cinderella
- 2018: Special Award of the Musical Theatre Jury for Cantos, Aleksey Syumak's opera

== Productions ==
- 2004/05 – Verdi's Aida directed by Dmitri Tcherniakov.
- 2005/06 – Concert performance and CD recording of Henry Purcell's Dido and Aeneas.
- 2006/07 – Mozart's Le Nozze di Figaro directed by Tatjana Gürbaca.
- 2006/07 – Shostakovich's Lady Macbeth of Mtsensk directed by Henrich Baranovsky.
- 2007 – Prokofiev's Cinderella.
- 2008/09 – Verdi's Macbeth directed by Dmitri Tcherniakov in Novosibirsk Opera and Ballet Theatre and Opéra Bastille.
- 2009/10 – Berg's Wozzeck directed by Dmitri Tcherniakov in Bolshoi Theatre.
- 2009/10 – Mozart's Don Giovanni directed by Dmitri Tcherniakov in Bolshoi Theatre and Aix-en-Provence Festival.
- 2010 – Mieczysław Weinberg's The Passenger at the Bregenzer Festspiele directed by David Pountney.
- 2010 – Alexey Syumak's The Requiem in the Moscow Art Theatre.
- 2011 – Mozart's Così fan tutte in the Perm Opera and Ballet Theatre.
- 2012 – Tchaikovsky's Iolanta and Stravinsky's Persephone in the Teatro Real, Madrid.
- 2012 – Verdi's Macbeth in the Bavarian State Opera, Munich.
- 2012 – Prokofiev's Chout.
- 2013 – Purcell's The Indian Queen in the Perm Opera and Ballet Theatre with coproduction of Teatro Real and English National Opera.
- 2014 – Dmitry Kurlyandsky's Nosferatu in the Perm Opera and Ballet Theatre.
- 2014 – Mozart's Don Giovanni in the Perm Opera and Ballet Theatre.
- 2015 – Shostakovich's Orango at Diaghilev Festival.
- 2016 – Verdi's La Traviata directed by Robert Wilson in the Perm Opera and Ballet Theatre.
- 2017 – Mozart's La clemenza di Tito at Salzburg Festival
- 2018 – Arthur Honegger's Jeanne d'Arc au bûcher at Diaghilev Festival.
- 2018 – Prokofiev's Cinderella in the Perm Opera and Ballet Theatre.
- 2018 – Alexey Syumak's Cantos in the Perm Opera and Ballet Theatre.

== Discography ==
Recordings are with Sony Classical unless otherwise noted:

- Purcell: Dido and Aeneas (Alpha, 2008)
- Mozart: Requiem (Alpha, 2011)
- Shostakovich: Symphony No. 14 (Alpha, 2011)
- Shostakovich: Piano Concertos; Sonata for Violin and Piano (Harmonia Mundi, 2012)
- Mozart: Le nozze di Figaro, 2014
- Rameau: The Sound of Light, 2014
- Mozart: Così fan tutte, 2014
- Stravinsky: Le Sacre du printemps, 2015
- Tchaikovsky: Violin Concerto, Stravinsky: Les Noces, 2016
- Mozart: Don Giovanni, 2016
- Artyomov: Symphony Gentle Emanation (Divine Art, 2016)
- Tchaikovsky: Symphony No. 6, 2017
- Mahler: Symphony No. 6, 2018
- Beethoven: Symphony No. 5, 2020
- Beethoven: Symphony No. 7, 2021

== Filmography ==
- Iolanta/Perséphone (Teatro Real, 2012)
- Purcell: The Indian Queen (Sony Classical, 2015)
- Dau: Lev Landau (Ilya Khrzhanovsky, 2019)

Cultural offices
| Preceded by Alexey Liudmilin | Principal Conductor, Novosibirsk Opera and Ballet Theatre; 2004–2011 | Succeeded by Ainars Rubikis |
| Preceded by Georgy Isaakyan | Music Director, Perm Opera and Ballet Theatre; 2011–2019 | Succeeded by Artyom Abashev |
| Preceded by (no predecessor) | Chief Conductor, SWR Symphonieorchester; 2018–2024 | Succeeded by François-Xavier Roth |
