= Arda Mandikian =

Greek soprano (1924–2009)

- Born: 1 September 1924; İzmir, Turkey
- Died: 8 November 2009 (aged 85); Athens, Greece
- Occupations: Singer, stage director

Arda Mandikian (Armenian: Արդա Մանդիկյան; 1 September 1924 – 8 November 2009) was an Armenian soprano opera singer. Mandikian launched her career in England. She took on leading roles in London and Edinburgh. In the 1980s she became the assistant director of the Greek National Opera.

== Career ==
Mandikian was born in İzmir, Turkey in 1924. Mandikian's parents, Krikor Mandikian and Beatrike Ananian, were survivors of the Armenian genocide. The family fled to Athens, Greece, and Mandikian was sent to the Athens Conservatory where she studied under Elvira de Hidalgo. When she was 15 she made her operatic début with Maria Callas. In 1948 she travelled to Britain to meet the scholar and composer Egon Wellesz. Wellesz arranged for her to give a recital that included Greek music written over two millennia. This included Delphic Hymns written in about 128 B.C. She also appeared in Wellesz's Incognita in Oxford. A demonstration of her singing led to regular work. In 1953 she had leading roles in operas in both Paris and London. In that year she was singing in London's Covent Garden in Peter Grimes by Benjamin Britten and in 1954 she appeared in Le Coq d’or by Rimsky-Korsakov again at the Royal Opera House.

In 1954 she sang the First Delphic Hymn at the Aldeburgh Festival. This inspired Benjamin Britten to include a similar idea in his The Turn of the Screw. Britten created the role of the ghost Miss Jessel especially for Mandikian. It has been said that Britten made the part so close to Mandikian that it "sounds like Arda, whoever sings it".

In the 1960s her mother became ill and she went back to look after her. Whilst she was back in Greece a military junta seized power there and Mandikian spoke out against them. She could not sing opera as she would not take work in Greece and she feared that she would be exiled if she left the country. The Greek junta's dictatorship ended in 1974. From 1974 to 1980 Mandikian was assistant director of the Greek National Opera. She worked with Christos Lambrakis.

Mandikian died in Athens in 2009.
