= UsefulCharts =

Chartmaking company

UsefulCharts Publishing Ltd.
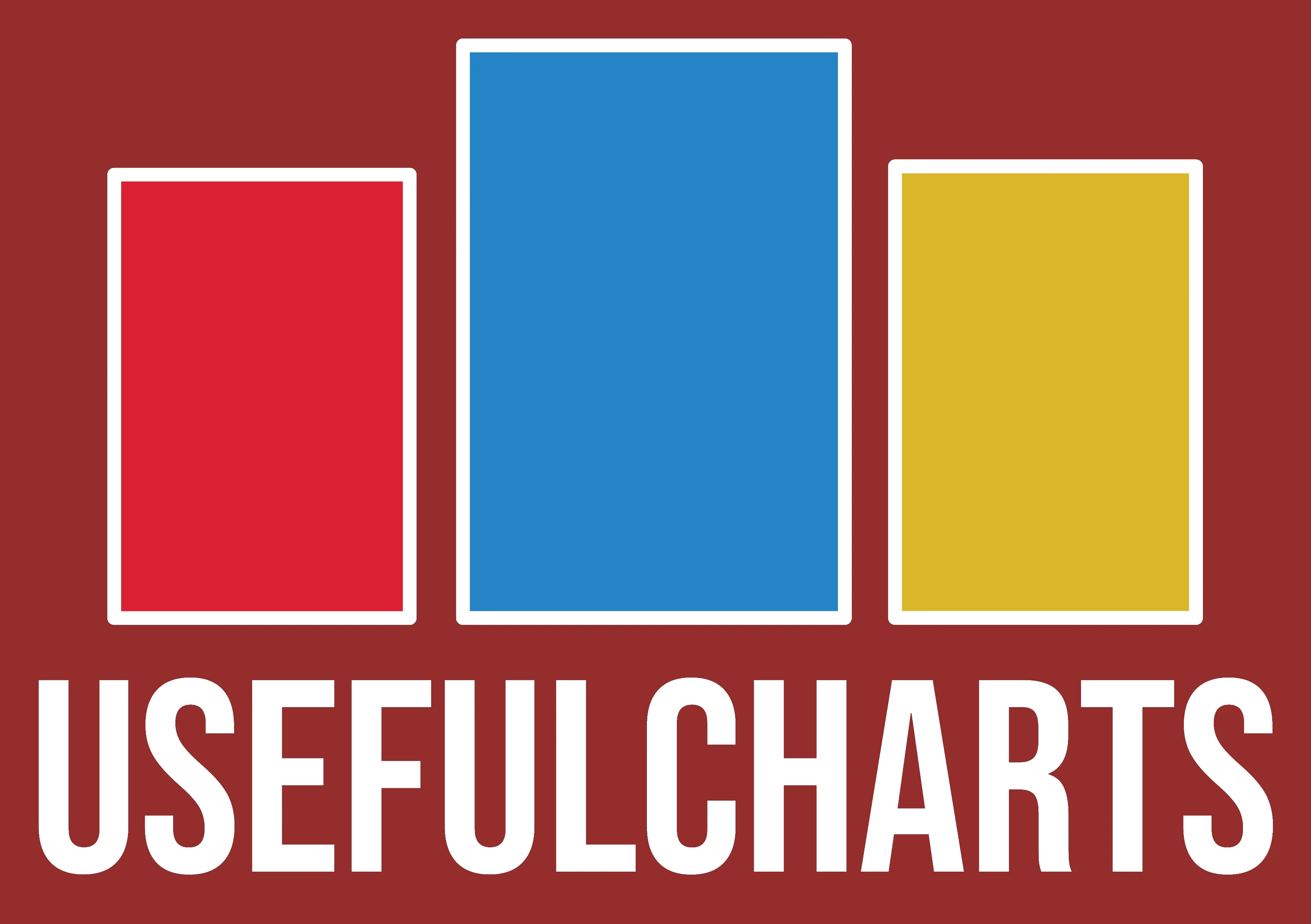
- Brand logo
- Company type: Private
- Genre: Infographics
- Founder: Matt Baker
- Headquarters: Vancouver, Canada
- Products: Educational charts; Nonfiction books

YouTube information
- Channel: UsefulCharts
- Genre: Education
- Subscribers: 2.07 million
- Views: 239 million
- Last updated: April 25, 2026
- Website: usefulcharts.com

UsefulCharts is a chartmaking company founded by Canadian educator and designer Matt Baker. The company produces infographic posters both physically and digitally and has an associated storefront in Vancouver and a YouTube channel.

== Founder ==
Matthew James Baker is a Canadian educator and designer who was born in 1975. In a YouTube video, Baker said that he was born into a family who were members of the Worldwide Church of God. He described the church as a cult and has since converted to Progressive Judaism. In 2003, he cofounded Beacon Hill Academy, a non-profit school in Nuwara Eliya, Sri Lanka, where he had previously worked as a teacher. When he moved to Vancouver in 2009, he uploaded around 100 educational charts online covering various topics which earned him money through Google AdSense advertisements on his website. He later began selling physical posters on Amazon.com and was able to rely on income from the UsefulCharts business by 2011.

Baker has a PhD in education, with his dissertation titled "Psychological type and atheism: why some people are more likely than others to give up God."

== Business ==
The company was started by Matthew Baker on February 2, 2018 with the purpose of turning Matt's hobby of making charts into a business.

=== Store ===
The storefront of the company is located at Commercial Drive, Vancouver, where physical posters and books by UsefulCharts are sold. Posters can also be purchased online through its website.

=== YouTube ===
The company has an associated YouTube channel where Baker narrates over videos presenting educational charts. Baker has said the revenue between physical chart sales and the channel is "about 50/50." In a Global News segment covering UsefulCharts, a video detailing the history of Vancouver was highlighted. It recently reached 2,000,000 subscribers.

=== Notable charts ===
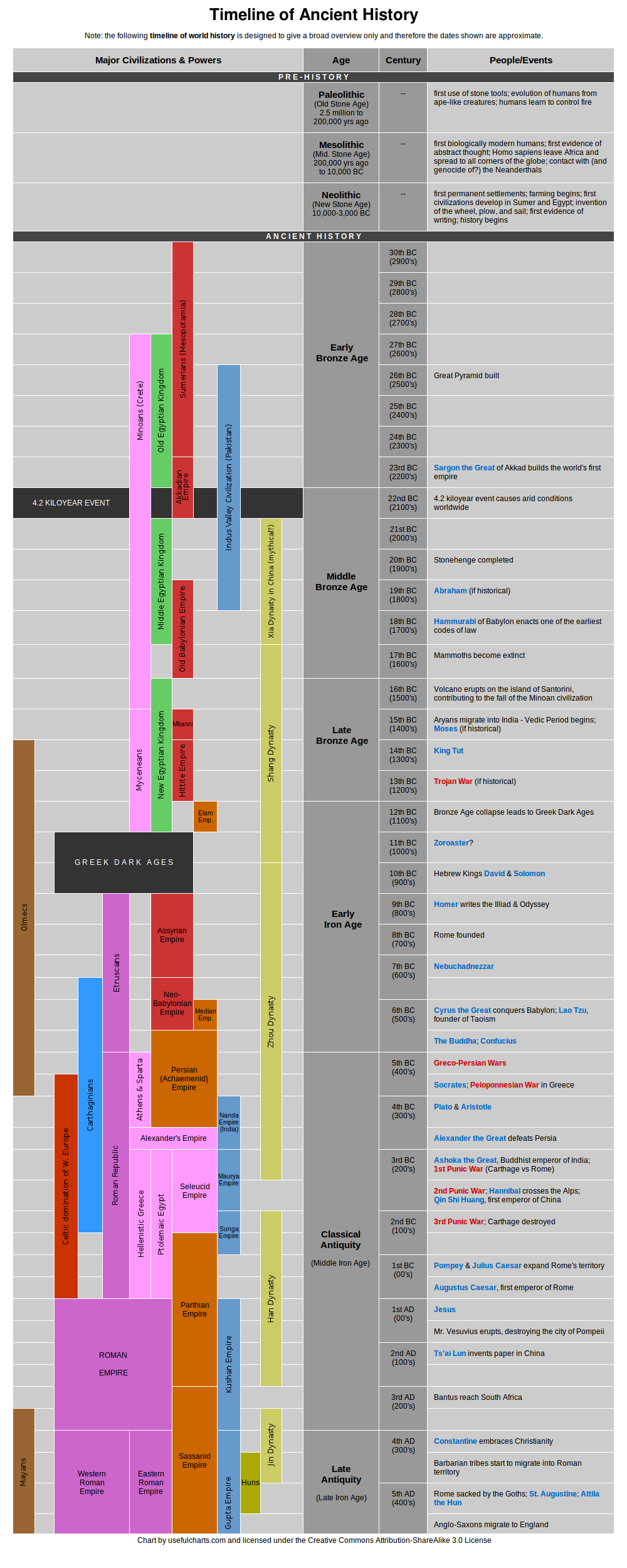
Timeline of ancient history, uploaded by UsefulCharts to Wikimedia Commons in 2011.

Charts designed by the company which have received media attention include:

- Evolution of the Alphabet: a visual timeline of all 26 glyphs in the English alphabet.
- Writing Systems of the World: a chart detailing writing systems of various languages.

=== Books ===
Books released under the UsefulCharts name include:

- Baker, Matt (2016-01-01). The Atheist Personality: Why some people are more likely to give up God. Vancouver: UsefulCharts. ISBN 9780994834669.
- Baker, Matt; Andrews, John (2020-10-20). Timeline of World History. Thunder Bay Press. ISBN 978-1-64517-417-2.
- Baker, Matt (2023-09-05). Timeline of the British Monarchy. Simon and Schuster. ISBN 978-1-6672-0079-8.
- Baker, Matt (2024-01-09). Timeline of the Bible. Simon and Schuster. ISBN 978-1-6672-0078-1.

== Reception ==
Biblical scholar Jacob L. Wright commented on Twitter in 2024 that Baker was "an extraordinary pedagogue" while sharing a video by UsefulCharts on the Twelve Tribes of Israel. Mark Wilson, writing for Fast Company, said Evolution of the Alphabet "beautifully illustrated" the history of the alphabet.
