= Galina Pisarenko =

Russian operatic soprano (1934–2022)

- Галина Писаренко
- Born: Galina Alexeyevna Kuzmina; 24 January 1934; Leningrad, Russian SFSR, USSR
- Died: 23 October 2022 (aged 88)
- Resting place: Troyekurovskoye Cemetery
- Education: Gnessin Institute of Music; Moscow Conservatory; Moscow State Institute of International Relations; Maurice Thorez Moscow State Pedagogical Institute of Foreign Languages; Moscow State University
- Occupations: Operatic soprano; Academic teacher; Theatre director
- Organizations: Stanislavski and Nemirovich-Danchenko Theatre; Komische Oper Berlin; Moscow Conservatory; Novaya Opera Theatre
- Awards: Honored Artist of the RSFSR; People's Artist of the RSFSR; Order of Honor

Galina Alekseyevna Pisarenko (Russian: Галина Алексеевна Писаренко; 24 January 1934 – 23 October 2022) was a Soviet-born Russian soprano and teacher. She showed musical promise as a child, and her aunt enrolled her in the Gnessin Institute of Music, where she graduated with a diploma in piano. She later chose to study voice instead at the Moscow Conservatory with Nina Dorliak, who became her lifelong mentor. For a time, Pisarenko studied concurrently at the Moscow State Institute of International Relations; then economics, English, and Norwegian at Moscow State University and the Maurice Thorez Moscow State Pedagogical Institute of Foreign Languages.

After graduating from the Moscow Conservatory in 1961, Pisarenko successfully auditioned for the Stanislavski and Nemirovich-Danchenko Theatre, where she earned international recognition as one of its leading singers. Yevgeny Svetlanov called her a "true master" and "diva". Dmitri Shostakovich personally selected her to perform at a festival dedicated to his life and music in 1964. From 1969 to 1976, she collaborated on a series of productions with stage director Walter Felsenstein, which led to her becoming a regular guest at the Komische Oper Berlin. She also sung the Moscow premiere of Vitaliy Hubarenko's mono-opera Tenderness to great acclaim and later recorded her interpretation.

Pisarenko became a teacher at the Moscow Conservatory in 1976, a position she held until her death. In 1990, she left the Stanislavski and Nemirovich-Danchenko Theatre. She joined the Novaya Opera Theatre in 1991, eventually becoming its director. She retired from singing in 1996. She died in 2022 and is buried at Troyekurovskoye Cemetery.

== Biography ==
=== Early life and education ===
Pisarenko (née Galina Alexeyevna Kuzmina) was born in Leningrad on 24 January 1934. Although her parents were not professional musicians, she recalled that both of them often sang at home, with her father accompanying himself on the guitar. Pisarenko sang in imitation of the adults at her home, which delighted her family, who often requested more songs from her. Before her third birthday, Pisarenko's mother died from tuberculosis; her father died in 1941. Pisarenko and her older sister went to Moscow to live with their aunt, Alexandra Kuzmina, whom they called "babushka".

Kuzmina took notice of Pisarenko's musical aptitude, whom she took to audition for piano lessons at the Gnessin Institute of Music. Elena Gnesina, one of the school's co-founders, asked Pisarenko to sing something instead of play the piano. Pisarenko later recalled that she was "terrified" at the thought of playing the piano, but that singing made her happy. She chose to sing a Russian folk song, "In a Field There Was a Birch Tree", and was immediately accepted into the Gnessin Institute. Pisarenko studied there for seven years, graduating with a piano diploma. During her high school years, she decided to learn singing instead of continuing with piano studies.

Afterwards, Pisarenko graduated high school, where she received a gold medal for scholastic achievement, and subsequently enrolled in the Moscow Conservatory. She successfully auditioned by singing a romance by Nikolai Rimsky-Korsakov. There her voice teacher was Nina Dorliak, who mentored her for the rest of her life.

Initially, Pisarenko was confident in her abilities, but quickly lost faith in herself because she heard fellow student singers whose voices "seemed better" than hers. She withdrew into herself and, with Dorliak's careful teaching, began to build the essentials of her technique, starting with breathing. When Pisarenko began her second year at the Conservatory, she had regained her confidence. During this time, Alexander Chugunov, the conductor of the conservatory's opera studio, asked Dorliak if she had any "ready-made Musettas" among her students for a forthcoming performance of La bohème; she recommended Pisarenko, who later recalled:

I went to the studio with little idea of what I was going to do. I was certainly musical ..., but there were also a lot of challenges. I learned the part in no time and dug into the rehearsal process. Keep in mind that Musetta is not an easy part at all. I call it a "make it or break it" role. When you step onto the stage, with all the lights, attention, and applause trained onto you, you either have to be the real Musetta or not even bother showing up. All the same, it is a marvelous role ... because Musetta is naughty, uninhibited, laughing, waltzing, mocking, and so on. In other words, you have no time to think about your wobbly knees, you really need to go out there and sing. It was exactly because of this that I really felt like a singer, then it all became so much easier: it was as if some flood gates opened up and everything just sorted itself out. It truly was like being reborn, I felt so happy!

After the performance, she was met by Dorliak, who enthusiastically told her, "You will be an artist!"

Her aunt, despite her earlier enthusiasm, insisted to Pisarenko that she study a "serious profession" along with music. Pisarenko therefore enrolled at the Moscow State Institute of International Relations (MGIMO). Among the lifelong friends she made there were Vladimir Petrovsky and Anatoly Slyusar. As a result of the MGIMO's reorganization in 1954, Pisarenko had to leave the school, but was allowed to continue her studies at any institution for the humanities of her choice. She decided to attend Moscow State University and the Maurice Thorez Moscow State Pedagogical Institute of Foreign Languages; studying economics at the former, while majoring in English and minoring in Norwegian at the latter. After graduating, she worked as a translator at a television factory.

Pisarenko, who was fluent in English, later kept a number of English, Scottish, and Irish folk songs in her personal repertoire, which she sang inflected in their local accents.

=== Stanislavski and Nemirovich-Danchenko Theatre ===
After one of Pisarenko's graduation performances at the Moscow Conservatory, she was visited by Emil Pasynkov, the director of the Novosibirsk Opera and Ballet Theatre. He offered her the part of Desdemona in a forthcoming production of Giuseppe Verdi's Otello. Excited, she related the news to Dorliak, who cautioned Pisarenko against accepting the offer. Instead, Dorliak suggested to Pisarenko that she audition at Moscow theatres first. Pisarenko was unsure of herself, felt that she was "not worthy" of performing at such important venues, and thought it would be better to begin her professional career at a provincial theatre. When an opportunity to audition at the Stanislavski and Nemirovich-Danchenko Theatre opened up, Pisarenko tried out and was accepted into the company. Pasynkov tried to get Pisarenko to reconsider her decision, but she declined, later explaining that one of the crucial reasons she preferred to work in Moscow was to remain close to Dorliak.

When Pisarenko started at the Stanislavski and Nemirovich-Danchenko Theatre, she was excited to work with singers who had been trained by Konstantin Stanislavski and Vladimir Nemirovich-Danchenko. Among them were Maya Meltzer and Mariya Goldina, respectively the Tatiana and Olga in the theatre's renowned 1922 production of Pyotr Ilyich Tchaikovsky's Eugene Onegin.

Pisarenko made her debut as the title character in Jacques Offenbach's operetta La belle Hélène, learning the role from Nadezhda Kemarskaya, who had first sung the role for the theatre. Pisarenko later recalled:

I worked with Kemarskaya on La belle Hélène for nine months! Think about that! Does anybody work with performers like that now? We did a great many sketches to get into the character of Hélène: all her entries, movements, and gestures had to be worked out in the minutest detail before I could even utter a single line. How she walked, what she thought, how her face looked like—in short, they sculpted her likeness. ... There could never be even a trace of lazy routine. Because of that I have my whole life hated apathetic attitudes in this profession: backstage conversations, gossiping before going on stage—I simply took them as insults.

She also appeared in leading roles of the coloratura soprano and lyric soprano repertoire, such as Wolfgang Amadeus Mozart's La finta giardiniera and Don Giovanni, Rimsky-Korsakov's May Night and The Tsar's Bride, and Igor Stravinsky's Mavra. She also appeared as Fiordiligi in Mozart's Così fan tutte, as Adina in Gaetano Donizetti's L'elisir d'amore; in the title roles of Jules Massenet's Manon, and Tchaikovsky's Iolanta; as both Mimi and Musetta in Giacomo Puccini's La bohème, and as Ninetta in Prokofiev's The Love for Three Oranges. She was coached in all her operatic roles by Dorliak.

One of Pisarenko's greatest successes was her performance in the first Moscow performance of Vitaliy Hubarenko's mono-opera, Tenderness. Based on a short story by Henri Barbusse, the expressionistic one-act opera had provoked controversy at its 1971 world premiere in Kiev, but Pisarenko's performance helped to earn it widespread praise in the Soviet Union. Pisarenko later spoke about her preparations for the role:

It was not just an important job: I loved the music and the story, I worked enraptured, I adored the role.

Pisarenko subsequently recorded Tenderness for Melodiya with the Bolshoi Theatre Orchestra conducted by Volodymyr Kozhukhar.

=== Shostakovich ===
In February 1964, Pisarenko was among the musicians selected by Dmitri Shostakovich to perform at a nine-day festival in Gorky dedicated to his music and influence. There she sang in the world premiere of the orchestral version of From Jewish Folk Poetry, which had been premiered in its original guise for voices and piano by her teacher Dorliak. Shostakovich later collaborated with Pisarenko again in 1972 during work on his unfinished opera, The Black Monk, for which he made an arrangement of the "Angel's Serenade" by Gaetano Braga. Together with mezzo-soprano Lyudmila Filatova, violinist Oleg Kagan, and pianist Sofia Khentova, Pisarenko performed it for Shostakovich while he was convalescing in the hospital in late 1972. They subsequently made a private recording for him of the arrangement. Pisarenko was among the musicians whose recordings were played at Shostakovich's funeral on 14 August 1975.

On 18 February 1996, Pisarenko, along with Oleh Krysa and Richard Carpenter, was among the musicians who performed at a concert held at CSU Long Beach's Carpenter Performing Arts Center that commemorated the 90th anniversary of Shostakovich's birth. She sang the Seven Romances on Poems by Alexander Blok. The Los Angeles Times review of her performance said that she "threaded her lines with rich voice and pregnantly restrained expression".

Her Shostakovich repertoire included From Jewish Folk Poetry, Seven Romances on Poems by Alexander Blok, and the Symphony No. 14.

=== Walter Felsenstein and the Komische Oper Berlin ===
In 1969, the Stanislavski and Nemirovich-Danchenko Theatre invited the director of the Komische Oper Berlin in East Germany, Walter Felsenstein, to lead a production of Georges Bizet's Carmen. Pisarenko, who sang the role of Micaëla, recalled that she and her fellow singers, who were mostly unfamiliar with the latest trends in staging outside of the Soviet Union, were intimidated by Felsenstein at first. Upon meeting him, he made "everyone feel at home"; they were quickly won over by his intellect and cultured bearing. They also enjoyed the directness with which he spoke about sexuality in Carmen, a subject then taboo in the Soviet Union.

Felsenstein later invited her, Emma Sarkisyan, Vyacheslav Osipov, and Dmitri Kitayenko to reprise their roles in the Komische Oper Berlin's production of Carmen. Pisarenko said the singers had to relearn all their sung and spoken dialogue in German. Although she said that Felsenstein's rehearsal were "grueling", she enjoyed singing for him:

[He was] an absolute dictator, yet he was interesting. ... You knew that you can perform for and with him, rehearse from morning until night. He did everything passionately and, when it worked out, he was overjoyed! ... A dictator, but reasonable. A dictator, yet your closest friend.

She defended Felsenstein against criticisms that he prioritized visuals over music, saying that he sought to "decipher" the music and "understand" the composer.

Pisarenko performed regularly at the Komische Oper Berlin until 1976.

=== Later career ===
In 1977, she performed in Tokyo as Tatyana in Eugene Onegin. She appeared as a guest with numerous ensembles, including performing in Rome in 1980.

In 1981, Pisarenko performed with Sviatoslav Richter at the first December Evenings Festival, which he co-founded with the director of the Pushkin Museum. Richter had called Pisarenko "the greatest Tatiana of them all". She recalled that he was "very supportive", but that she also felt under great pressure when singing with him:

It was very rewarding, but [Richter] did not tolerate any kind of superficiality. Our rehearsals were basically concerts. He played with total devotion, therefore the singer needed to mobilize all possible resources that are usually left to rest during a rehearsal. You could not slack off with him. His fire goaded one to respond with the utmost of one's abilities.

In 1990, Pisarenko left the Stanislavski and Nemirovich-Danchenko Theatre. A number of its musicians, led by conductor Yevgeny Kolobov, co-founded the Novaya Opera Theatre, which Pisarenko joined in 1991. She became its director in 1994. Despite creative differences between her and Kolobov, she intensely admired his conducting, and added, "And if he called me along, how could I not come?" In her first season there, she learned her final new role as the titular character in Prokofiev's Maddalena.

She retired from professional singing in 1996.

=== Death ===
Pisarenko died on 23 October 2022, at age 88.

== Teaching ==
Pisarenko joined the faculty of the Moscow Conservatory in 1976. She became an associate professor in 1982, then professor in 1995. She taught until her death and was regarded by her students as one of the best modern voice teachers. Among those who studied with Pisarenko are Elena Guseva, Albina Latipova, Irina Romishevskaya, and Albina Shagimuratova. Pisarenko gave master classes internationally and she also wrote articles and books on the art of singing. She was honorary professor at the Orpheon Conservatory in Athens, and from 2002 was a guest professor at the American Institute of Musical Studies in Graz.

She was a member of the jury of the International Tchaikovsky Competition and other vocal competitions. In 2017, she led the creation the Nina Dorliak Competition, which was co-founded by the Ministry of Culture of the Russian Federation and the Moscow Society of Mozart Lovers, of which she was president. She was also a jury member of What the 20th Century Left Us, a competition for best performances of music by Boris Tchaikovsky. According to a 2012 interview with Pisarenko published in Moskovskij Komsomolets, she said she was proud of her students' successes:

I do not want to brag at all, but [my students] have been laureates at the last three Tchaikovsky competitions. First [Anastisiya] Bakastova, then Shagimuratova, then Elena Guseva at the most recent competition. By the way, there is a recording online of Tatiana's letter scene from Eugene Onegin. Compare her performance with the Korean winner, [Seo Sunyoung]: it is the difference between heaven and earth in favor of Guseva.

In the same interview, Pisarenko deplored the lack of professional opportunities available to young singers in Russia, as well as the tendency in Russia to engage singers from abroad. She compared the current situation unfavorably with Soviet times.

She also referred to Shagimuratova as her "favorite student".

== Personal life ==
Pisarenko married twice. Her first husband was Novomir Pisarenko, a theoretical physicist. They had one son, Alexander.

Her second marriage was to Viktor Ivanovich Malanichev, a scientist she met while touring in Yakutsk. According to Manichev, the moment he met Pisarenko he "knew that was it". They were married for 35 years until Pisarenko's death.

== Views ==
Pisarenko disapproved of opera being sung in translation, saying that a singer was obligated to sing in the work's original language. She said that singing an opera like Eugene Onegin in German meant that it was "no longer Tchaikovsky".

She also strongly disdained regieoper:

It is abnormal, decadence and outrage, all the work of the evil one. Both here [in Russia] and in the West they go crazy in their own way. This modernization and pornography on stage is absolutely impossible for art—shut your windows and doors! The voice is no longer the main focus ...

== Recordings ==
Pisarenko was the soprano soloist in a 1979 recording of Sergei Rachmaninoff's The Bells, alongside tenor Aleksei Maslennikov and baritone Sergei Yakovenko, with Yevgeny Svetlanov conducting the Yurlov Russian Choir and the USSR Symphony Orchestra. She later recalled that the tension was "gigantic" during the recording sessions:

But I had never before experienced such a high! It felt as if I were not on the ground, but soaring in the sky with this incredible music. Svetlanov himself was unusual in the way he communicated: very straightforward and tender, but you sensed his power and authority, his wild temperament.

A reviewer noted that she was "a very fine singer who offers fervent, ecstatic singing in the second movement". Svetlanov himself praised Pisarenko as a "true master" and "diva".

She recorded, partly live, songs by Karol Szymanowski in Warsaw in 1982 on the occasion of the composer's centenary, with Sviatoslav Richter at the piano, including the song cycle The Love Songs of Hafiz and Songs on Words by James Joyce. They also performed the former at an all-Szymanowski recital at the inaugural December Evenings Festival, which was televised. Pisarenko said of this program:

Our work was not only in making sense of Szymanowski's complex music, not just surmounting purely vocal challenges, but also Richter was seeking a particular psychological state for each song […] For example, in the first song he said that one ought to feel like a young man overwhelmed with wonder at the beauty before him; a state of awe in which he is ready to fly into the sky.

She recorded in 1983 the role of the Princess in Dargomyzhsky's Rusalka, conducted by Vladimir Fedoseyev.

== Awards ==
Soviet Union

- Honored Artist of the RSFSR (1974)
- People's Artist of the RSFSR (1982)

Russia

- Order of Honor (2007)
- Honorary Member of the Russian Academy of Arts (2022)

== Sources ==
- Khentova, Sofia (1985). Шостакович. Жизнь и творчество, Т. 2 [Shostakovich. Life and Work, vol. 2] (in Russian). Moscow: Советский композитор [Soviet Composer].
- Khentova, Sofia (1986). Шостакович в Москве [Shostakovich in Moscow] (in Russian). Moscow: Московский рабочий [Moscow Worker].
- Vulfson, Alexander, ed. (2000). Шостакович: между мгновением и вечностью. Документы, материалы, статьи [Shostakovich: Between a Moment and Eternity. Documents, materials, articles] (in Russian). Saint Petersburg: Композитор [Composer].
