= Yuliya Abakumovskaya =

Russian soprano (born 1942)

Yuliya Dmitriyevna Abakumovskaya
- Born: Юлия Дмитриевна Абакумовская; 3 May 1942 (age 84); Samara, Russia
- Occupation: mezzo-soprano

Yuliya Dmitriyevna Abakumovskaya (Russian: Юлия Дмитриевна Абакумовская; born 3 May 1942), also spelled Julija Dimitrijewna Abakumowskaja, is a Russian mezzo-soprano.

== Life and career ==
Yuliya Abakumovskaya was born in Samara on 3 May 1942. She grew up in Moscow and in her youth performed in a music ensemble conducted by Vladimir Loktev. She began studies at the Lunacharsky State Institute for Theatre Arts (LSIT, now Russian Institute of Theatre Arts) in 1962. She studied singing at that institution with tenor Pavel Pontryagin. She graduated from LSIT in 1967.

In 1969 Abakumovskaya made her debut at the Stanislavski and Nemirovich-Danchenko Theatre (SNDT) in Moscow, and was subsequently a principal artist at the theatre from 1970 until 1991. Her first leading role at SNDT was in 1970 in the title role of Offenbach's La Périchole. While predominantly a mezzo-soprano she occasionally played soprano roles with this company. In 1977 she starred as Suzanne in a Russian-language film adaptation of Offenbach's Un mari à la porte. On 18 September 1981 she was made an Honored Artist of the RSFSR.

Abakumovskaya sang in both operas and operettas at SNDT; including performances as Arminda in Mozart's La finta giardiniera, Bronislava in Millöcker's Der Bettelstudent, Clara d'Almanza in Prokofiev's Betrothal in a Monastery, Euridice in Haydn's L'anima del filosofo, Frau Reich (Meg Page) in Nicolai's The Merry Wives of Windsor, the Innkeeper in Mussorgsky's Boris Godunov, Leonore in Tikhon Khrennikov's Dorothea, Olga in Tchaikovsky's Eugene Onegin, Polina in Tchaikovsky's The Queen of Spades, the Queen in Weinberg's The Love of d'Artagnan, Rosina in The Barber of Seville, Selina (aka Lasocka) in Kabalewski's Colas Breugnon, Serena in Porgy and Bess, Zosja in Khrennikov's The Golden Calf and the title role in Bizet's Carmen.

In 1991 Abakumovskaya became a principal artist at the Novaya Opera Theatre (NOT). She made her debut there as Naina in Mikhail Glinka's Ruslan and Lyudmila under conductor Yevgeny Kolobov. She later toured in this NOT production to New York City, where it was performed at Avery Fisher Hall. On 11 January 1994 she was named a People's Artist of Russia. In 1997 she returned to New York to portray Larina in Eugene Onegin at the Martin Beck Theatre on Broadway as part of the Moscow Arts Festival. Other roles she has performed during her career include Bobylikha in The Snow Maiden, Clotilde in Norma, Flora in La traviata, Giovanna in Rigoletto, Lucia in Cavalleria rusticana, and the Nanny in Anton Rubinstein's The Demon.
