= Nemolyaev =

Nemolyaev (Russian: Немоляев) is a Russian surname. The feminine form is Nemolyaeva (Russian: Немоляева). It is a patronymic surname derived from the nickname "Nemolyay", i.e., "one who does not pray". Notable people with these names include:

- Anastasiya Nemolyaeva (born 1969), Soviet and Russian actress and designer
- Kirill Nemolyaev, Russian rock musician, songwriter, and music producer
- Nikolay Nemolyaev (born 1938), Soviet and Russian cinematographer
- Svetlana Nemolyaeva (born 1937), Soviet and Russian actress
- Vladimir Nemolyaev (1902–1987), Soviet film director and screenwriter
- Vsevolod Nemolyaev (1937–2025), Soviet and Russian ballet dancer and director of the Bolshoi Theatre
