= Nina Dorliak =

Russian soprano (1908–1998)

Nina Dorliak Нина Дорлиак
- Born: 7 July 1908; Saint Petersburg, Russia
- Died: 17 May 1998 (aged 89) Moscow, Russia
- Genre: Classical
- Occupations: Singer; teacher
- Instrument: Singing
- Spouse: Sviatoslav Richter

Nina Lvovna Dorliak (Note: Russian: Нина Львовна Дорлиак, romanized: Nina Lvovna Dorliak) (7 July 1908 – 17 May 1998) was a Russian soprano and a voice teacher at the Moscow Conservatory. She is known for forming a duo with pianist Sviatoslav Richter in recitals and recordings.

== Life ==
Nina Dorliak was born in Saint Petersburg. Her mother was Xenia Nikolayevna Dorliak (née Fehleisen), a maid of honour of Empress Marie Feodorovna, and later a singer and voice teacher at the Moscow Conservatory. Her father was the financier Lev Fabianovitch Dorliak (Leo Dorliac), whose father had emigrated from France to Russia during the reign of Alexander II of Russia. She attended the Petrischule, a German school in Saint Petersburg. Dorliak was a pupil of her mother at the Moscow Conservatory, completing regular studies in 1932 and continuing a course of advanced studies until 1935.

Dorliak's career began in 1935 as a recitalist of art songs, accompanied by pianists such as Konstantin Igumnov, Aleksandr Goldenweiser, Maria Yudina, and Maria Grinberg. In 1947, she became a professor at the Moscow Conservatory. Among her best-known students were Galina Pisarenko, Erik Kurmangaliev, and Alla Ablaberdyeva. Dorliak gave many concerts in Russia and abroad, mainly in the art song repertoire, with a focus on Italian composers such as Alessandro Scarlatti, French composers such as Claude Debussy, Maurice Ravel and Francis Poulenc, and Russian composers such as Mikhail Glinka, Modest Mussorgsky and Sergei Rachmaninoff. She was the first performer of several works by Sergei Prokofiev and Dmitri Shostakovich. She also performed Russian folk songs. The German lieder composers she most often performed were Franz Schubert and Robert Schumann.

In 1943, Dorliak met Sviatoslav Richter, who was already a renowned pianist. They performed together in concert and made recordings. She has been said to have married Richter in 1946, but Michel Krielaars writes that Richter "and Dorliak never shared a bed and never married", and that Richter was gay and Dorliak a lesbian. She accompanied Richter on tours throughout his career for more than fifty years, supporting him until his last illness. He died on 1 August 1997. She died soon afterwards on 17 May 1998 at the age of 89. Her funeral took place in Moscow, after a last homage in the Great Hall of the Moscow Conservatory. She is buried at Novodevichy Cemetery in Moscow.

Dorliak's legacy includes numerous recordings, some of them as a duo with Richter, with a repertoire that includes Schumann, Prokofiev, and Mussorgsky. With Richter, she recorded songs by Johann Sebastian Bach and excerpts from his cantatas, sung in Russian.
