= Kolobov =

Kolobov (Russian: Колобов) is a surname. Notable people with the surname include:

- Leonid Kolobov (1907–1993), Soviet soldier
- Yevgeny Kolobov (1946–2003), Russian musician
- Yuriy Kolobov (born 1973), Ukrainian politician
