= Anna Karamazoff =

1991 film by Rustam Khamdamov

- Film poster
- Directed by: Rustam Khamdamov
- Written by: Rustam Khamdamov
- Produced by: Serge Silberman
- Starring: Jeanne Moreau; Yelena Solovey
- Cinematography: Yuri Klimenko
- Edited by: Inessa Brozhovskaya
- Distributed by: Mosfilm; Victoria film
- Release date: 1991
- Running time: 125 minutes
- Countries: Soviet Union; France
- Language: Russian

Anna Karamazoff (Russian: Анна Карамазофф) is a 1991 Soviet-French drama film directed by Rustam Khamdamov. It was entered into the 1991 Cannes Film Festival.

== Plot ==
In 1949, a woman (her name is not revealed, referred to as Anna) returns from a labor camp to Leningrad. A young man, covered in liquid clay and wearing a women's purse on his belt, shoots at her with an imaginary bow. On the train, the heroine keeps a diary and reflects on her uncertain future. She arrives at her apartment, but it is already inhabited by three Uzbek women. One of them (Tatiana Drubich) tries to pull a milk tooth from a child. Anna goes to a communal apartment where her documents were once hidden. There, a child speaks from behind a door, claiming to be alone and unable to open it. Anna is about to leave but is recognized and let in. Inside, there are three people: two men (Pyotr Mamonov, Alexander Feklistov) and a woman (Svetlana Nemolyaeva), who was pretending to be the child. The chest with the documents has been burned.

Later, Anna visits a house where a mad grandmother (Maria Kapnist) lives with her grandsons – a boy named Alexander and a girl named Mari (Olga Orlova). She helps pull a tooth from the boy. The apartment is filled with works of art in the avant-garde style. There, Anna learns of her mother's death, Maria Alexandrovna. Mari tells her how to find her mother's grave: "There lives a Big Black Dog—Kaplan, she will show you the way" (a black German shepherd named Greta, owned by Nadezhda Borisovna Sager, also the dog's trainer in the film, and a double for the heroine in scenes with the dog in the background).

Anna goes to the cemetery. There, a pioneer is being buried... The Big Black Dog Kaplan (Greta) passes by, marking her presence and leading Anna towards the search for her mother's grave. She returns to the city and sees a boy in a rabbit costume. She chases after him and enters a cinema where a black-and-white film is playing, composed of fragments from Khodjamirov's film Unexpected Joys: the actresses Natasha (Natalya Leble) and Lena (Elena Solovey) collect carpets and learn a legend about a main carpet that has magical powers. When they buy it, they realize the legend is no longer true, as the main condition had been broken: no innocent blood had been spilled on the carpet in a hundred years. Persuaded by the filmmaker Prokudin-Gorsky (Emmanuel Vitorgan), the sisters go to the front line, hoping to lay the carpet under one of the innocent victims and revive the belief by spilling her blood. However, Prokudin-Gorsky himself spills his own blood on the carpet, and he is killed with a sabre. Yet, the belief is not revived, and they have been deceived.

Later, Anna meets a young man (Viktor Sibilev). He once turned the notes for a singer called "Divine," but now he is impoverished. They go to his home, and while playing Chopin on the piano, Anna offers to help him. Together, they decide to kill and rob a rich retired military officer who, based on Anna's remarks, once wrote a denunciation about her. Anna has poison in a vial (which she took from the labor camp). They go to the Yeliseevsky store and buy Crimean apples. Anna injects the poison into one of the apples. After waiting for the officer's wife (Natalya Fateeva) to leave, Anna takes the poisoned apples to him. He mistakes her for Anna Karamazova (whom he had just spoken to on the phone) and lets her in. After eating the apple, the officer dies. Anna robs him, but his wife unexpectedly returns. They struggle, and Anna escapes.

Later, Anna and the young man go to the theater. She still carries the purse. She leaves it in the box, and it starts to swell. Anna goes down into a flooded toilet and gives the old cleaning lady the stolen clothes from the officer.

In the young man's house, a passing train causes a portrait of young Vladimir Lenin to fall and break, as it is accompanied by the words "Sesame, open up!"

== Cast ==
- Jeanne Moreau as Woman (voice by Svetlana Nemolyayeva and Olga Volkova)
- Yelena Solovey as Silent Film Star
- Natalya Leble as Natasha
- Viktor Sibilyov as Young Man
- Gregory Hlady (as Grigori Gladij)
- Yuri Solomin as rich man
- Natalya Fateyeva as his wife
- Vladislav Vetrov as Roshchin-Insarov, graphologist
- Emmanuil Vitorgan as Prokudin-Gorsky, director
- Aleksandr Feklistov as Aleksandr Vasilyevich
- Maria Vinogradova as black woman, concierge, assistant director in theater
- Svetlana Nemolyayeva as neighbour
- Gennadi Nilov as KGB major
- Maria Kapnist as granny Sonia
