= Elena Guseva =

Russian operatic soprano

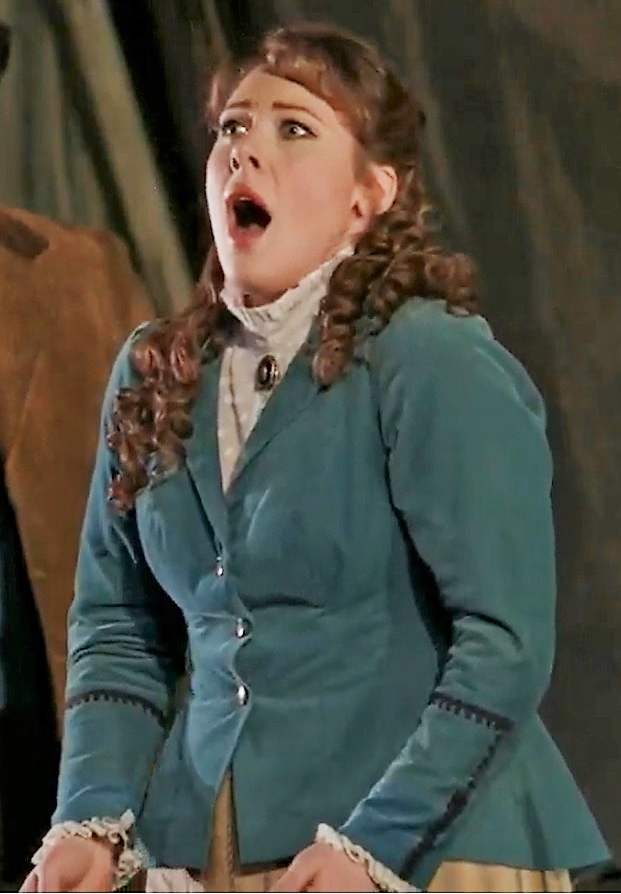
- Guseva sings as Mimi in La bohème, Deutsche Oper Berlin, 2020
- Born: Kurgan
- Education: Kurgan Conservatory; Moscow Conservatory
- Occupation: Operatic soprano

Elena Guseva is a Russian operatic soprano who has performed at major opera houses in Europe. Besides standard repertoire such as Verdi's Aida and Puccini's Mimi, she has focused on roles by Russian composers, such as Tchaikovsky's Lisa and Prokofiev's Polina, a role she performed when Der Spieler (The Gambler) was first performed at the Vienna State Opera.

== Career ==
Guseva was born in Kurgan, southwest Siberia. She was exposed to music when her mother took her along to choir rehearsals at age three. She first studied choral conducting at the Kurgan Conservatory until 2006, and then voice at the Moscow Conservatory with Galina Pisarenko, where she graduated with excellence in 2011.

Beginning in 2009, she has performed regularly at the Stanislavski and Nemirovich-Danchenko Theatre in Moscow, in roles such as Puccini's Mimì in La bohème and the title role of Madama Butterfly, Tatjana in Tchaikovsky's Eugene Onegin, Leonora in Verdi's La forza del destino, Elvira in Mozart's Don Giovanni, Micaela in Bizet's Carmen, Antonia in Offenbach's Les contes d'Hoffmann, Emma in Mussorgsky's Khovanshchina and Natasha in Prokofiev's War and Peace. She appeared as a guest at the Staatstheater Saarbrücken as Jaroslawna in Borodin's Prince Igor and the Deutsche Oper Berlin as Mimi. She appeared at the Théâtre du Capitole in Toulouse as Gerhilde in Wagner's Die Walküre, at the Theater Basel as Polina in Prokofiev's Der Spieler, the Hamburg State Opera and Opéra National de Lyon, adding roles such as Verdi's Aida and Desdemona, and Puccini's Tosca to her repertoire. She performed at international festivals, as Lisa in Tchaikovsky's Pique Dame at the Savonlinna Opera Festival, and as Nastasja in Tchaikovsky's Die Zauberin at the Festival Vie et Destins in Lyon.

In 2017, Guseva performed as Polina in the first production of Prokofiev's Der Spieler at the Vienna State Opera. On the occasion, she was interviewed and said that having trained as a choral conductor "helped her extremely" to analyse its score. She noted that Dostojevsky, who wrote the novel on which the opera is based, gave the character of Polina many aspects but ultimately left her relationship to the Marquis open, with room for interpretation. She returned to Vienna as Madame Butterfly, Aida, Desdemona and Tatjana.

Guseva appeared at the Bavarian State Opera in the 2020/21 season as Liù in Puccini's Turandot and as Marietta in Korngold's Die tote Stadt alongside Klaus Florian Vogt. A reviewer noted her intense timbre and "beautifully dark blazing passion" ("schön dunkel lodernde Leidenschaft").

== Awards ==
- Silver Voice, All-Russian Competition of Young Singers (2nd prize, 2004)
- Ningbo Vocal Competition in China (4th prize, 2008)
- Seventh Elena Obraztsova International Competition of Young Opera Singers (1st prize, 2009)
- Savonlinna International Singing Competition in Finland (3rd prize, 2010)
- International Singing Competition Francisco Viňas (3rd prize, 2011)
- XIV Tchaikovsky Competition (3rd prize, 2011 and webcast audience choice).
