= The Bottomless Bag =

- Film poster
- Directed by: Rustam Khamdamov
- Written by: Rustam Khamdamov
- Produced by: Lyubov Obminyanaya; Rustam Khamdamov; Tikhon Pendyurin
- Starring: Svetlana Nemolyaeva; Sergey Koltakov
- Cinematography: Tim Lobov; Pyotr Dukhovskoy
- Music by: Dmitry Kurlyandsky; Edward Elgar
- Distributed by: Rustam Hamdamov Studio; Andrei Konchalovsky's Film Company
- Release date: June 26, 2017 (Moscow International Film Festival)
- Running time: 104 minutes
- Country: Russia
- Language: Russian
- Budget: $2 500 000

The Bottomless Bag (Russian: Мешок без дна, romanized: Meshok bez dna) is a 2017 Russian historical drama film directed by Rustam Khamdamov. The film is based on Ryunosuke Akutagawa's 1922 story In a Grove which takes place during the times of Tsar Alexander II.

== Plot ==
The story takes place during the reign of Russian Emperor Alexander II. The maid of honor of princely palace tells prince a fairy tale that occurs in the XIII century and tells about the mystical murder of prince in the forest. The participants in the story, witnesses of this crime, tell different versions of the incident, which are different from what actually happened.

== Cast ==
- Svetlana Nemolyaeva as Lady-in-waiting
- Sergey Koltakov as Grand Prince
- Anna Mikhalkova as Empress
- Andrey Kuzichev as Prince
- Kirill Pletnyov as robber
- Alla Demidova as Baba Yaga
- Evgeniy Tkachuk as guard

== Awards and nominations ==
Awards and nominations
Award	Year	Category	Nominee	Result	Note
Moscow International Film Festival	2017	Russian Film Critics Award	Rustam Khamdamov	Won	
Moscow International Film Festival	2017	Special Jury Award	Rustam Khamdamov	Won	
Moscow International Film Festival	2017	Golden St. George		Nominated	
Russian Guild of Film Critics	2017	Best Production Designer	Irina Ochina	Won	
Russian Guild of Film Critics	2017	Best Film		Nominated	
Russian Guild of Film Critics	2017	Best Director	Rustam Khamdamov	Nominated	
Russian Guild of Film Critics	2017	Best Actress	Svetlana Nemolyaeva	Nominated	
Golden Eagle Award	2018	Best Supporting Actress	Anna Mikhalkova	Nominated	
Asia Pacific Screen Awards	2017	Best Cinematography	Tim Lobov; Pyotr Dukhovskoy	Won	
Buenos Aires International Festival of Independent Cinema	2018	Best Feature Film — Avant-Garde and Genre	Rustam Khamdamov	Nominated	
