= Urals Mussorgsky State Conservatoire =

University in Yekaterinburg, Russia

Coordinates: 56.837°N 60.600°E

- Уральская государственная консерватория (академия) им. М.П. Мусоргского
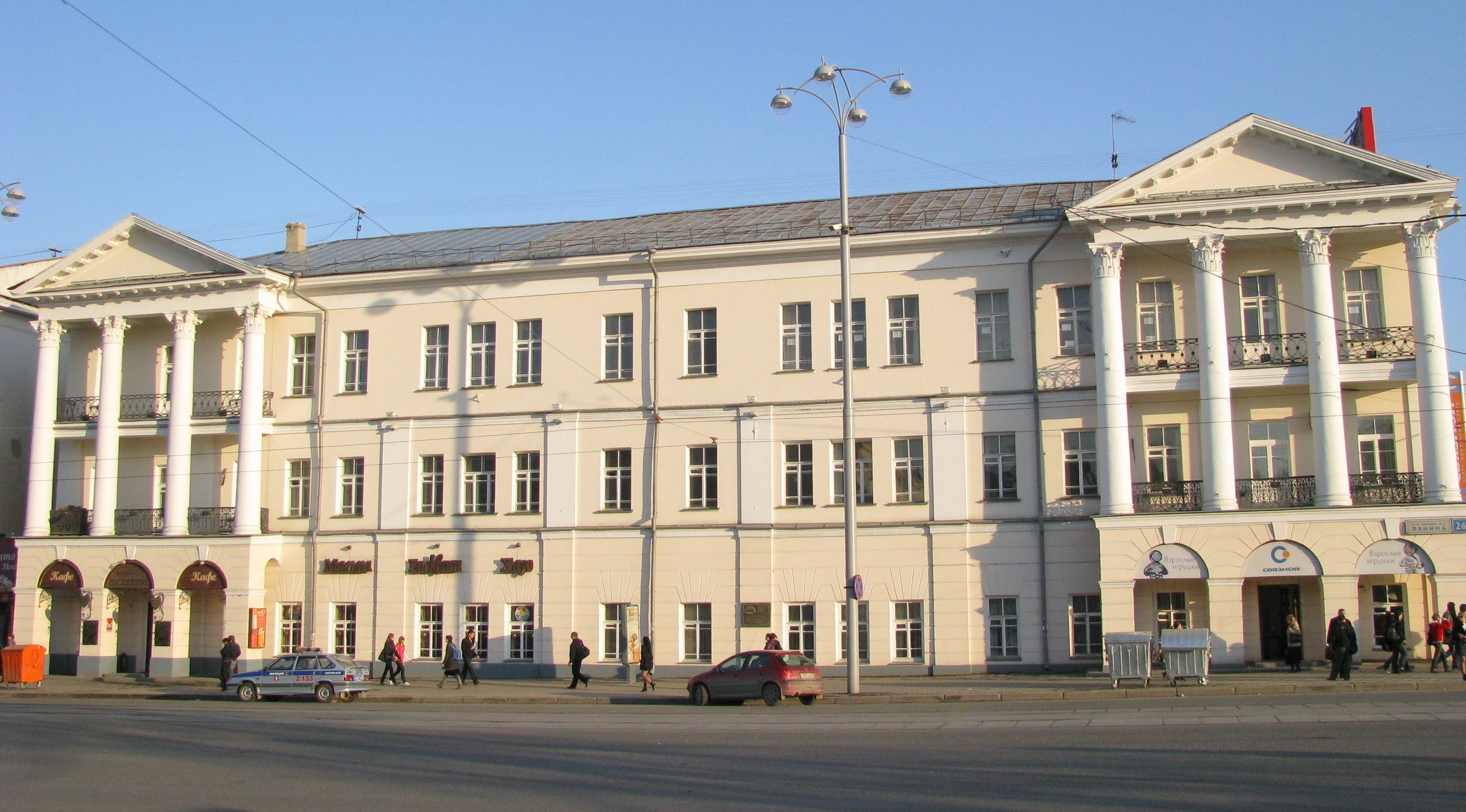
- Type: conservatoire
- Established: 1934
- Rector: Shkarupa Valery
- Location: (Russia) Yekaterinburg, Sverdlovsk Oblast, Russia
- Campus: urban
- Website: www.uralconsv.org

Urals Mussorgsky State Conservatoire is a musical university in Yekaterinburg, Sverdlovsk Oblast, Russia. The Ural State Conservatory was founded in 1934. In 1939 the Conservatory had its first graduates.

== History ==
The Sverdlovsk Conservatory was founded in 1934. In 1939, the year of its first graduation, it was named in honour of the 100th anniversary of the outstanding composer M. P. Mussorgsky.

In 1945 the Sverdlovsk Conservatory became the Urals Conservatory.

== Faculties and institutes ==
There are 2 faculties and 26 basic educational programs.

== Notable alumni ==
- Anatoliy Andreyev – Buryat composer
- Anastasiya Bespalova – composer
- Yuri Gulyayev – opera singer
- Marina Domashenko – opera singer
- Boris Shtokolov – opera singer
- Yevgeny Kolobov – conductor, founder of the Novaya Opera Theatre (Moscow)
- Artem Tenkeli - pianist

== Notable faculty ==
- Vladimir Kobekin
