= Regietheater =

Re-interpretation of plays and operas

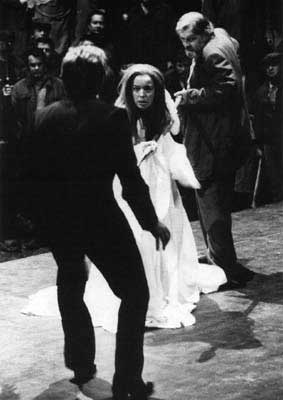
A scene from Götterdämmerung, part four of the Ring Cycle, set during the Industrial Revolution for the 1976 Bayreuth Festival.

Regietheater (German: [ʁeˈʒiːteˌaːtɐ]; German for director's theater) is the modern practice of allowing a director freedom in devising the way a given opera or play is staged so that the creator's original, specific intentions or stage directions (where supplied) can be changed, together with major elements of geographical location, chronological situation, casting and plot. Typically such changes may be made to point a particular political point or modern parallels which may be remote from traditional interpretations.

Examples found in Regietheater productions may include some or all of the following:

- Relocating the story from the original location to a more modern period (including setting in a totalitarian regime)
- Modifications to the story from the original script
- Interpretative elements stressing the role of race/gender/class-based oppression are emphasised. In his 1976 staging of the Ring Cycle at the Bayreuth Festival, Patrice Chéreau used an updated 19th-century setting that followed the interpretation of George Bernard Shaw, who saw the Ring as a social commentary on the exploitation of the working class by wealthy 19th-century capitalists.
- Abstraction in the set design
- An emphasis on sexuality
- Costumes that frequently mix eras and locales. Examples include the Opera Theatre of Saint Louis's 2010 production of Mozart's The Marriage of Figaro and its 2011 Don Giovanni which portray some characters in 18th-century attire and others in mid-20th century clothing.

== History ==
It can be argued that Regietheater began with the work of Wieland Wagner (1917–1966), who in the years after World War II responded to the profound problematisation of the work of his grandfather, Richard Wagner, resulting from its earlier appropriation by the Nazis, by designing and producing minimalist and heavily symbolic stagings of Wagner operas in Bayreuth and elsewhere. Guided by the theories of Adolphe Appia, Wieland Wagner's productions allegedly sought to emphasise the epic and universal aspects of the Wagner dramas, and were justified as being attempts to explore the texts from the viewpoint of (often Jungian) depth psychology. In practice this would mean, for example, that the opening act of Die Walküre (the second work of the Ring Cycle), specifically described as set in Hunding's forest hut, was presented on a stage shaped as a large, sloping disc: no hut was either seen or implied, and the composer's many detailed instructions relating to the actions of Wehwalt, Sieglinde and Hunding within the hut were disregarded because it was said that the details of the scoring meant that they were already illustrated musically.

Examples

- In 1976 the Patrice Chéreau production of the centenary Bayreuth Ring sought to make manifest an anti-capitalist and Marxian subtext recognized to be present in the work given the time of its original creation: following this conception, Wagner's mischievous Rhinemaidens became three ragged whores plying their trade near a hydroelectric dam, the gods are a late-19th century industrialist family, and Siegfried used an industrial steam-hammer to forge his sword.
- The rise of deconstructionism gave a new lease of life to Regietheater in Europe and elsewhere. Prominent American deconstructionists include Peter Sellars and David Alden. Other directors often associated with Regietheater include Walter Felsenstein and Christopher Alden. Alden states: "Opera is a lot like the Catholic Church in terms of the way people are devoted to it and how to a lot of people it's as holy, as sacrosanct and as untouchable as religion. In that way I think it’s still necessary to keep smashing those idols and keep trying to get beyond that idolatry — so that you can get at things that are maybe closer to the bone, and more human.". Calixto Bieito, Harry Kupfer, David Pountney, and Claus Guth, have also applied such principles to a wide range of operas from the classical and romantic periods.

== Controversy ==
Supporters of Regietheater hold that works from earlier centuries not only permit but even demand to be re-invented in ways that not only fit contemporary intellectual fashion but even strive to connect them with situations and locations of which the original composers and librettists could not have conceived, thus setting the story into a context the contemporary audience can relate to.

Opponents accuse such producers of shallowness, crudity, sensationalism, lack of real creativity, insensitivity to the richness of the original setting, neglect of the role played by the music, and pandering to the appetites of ephemeral journalism. More and more, however, critics distinguish between "proper" application of Regietheater principles and the gratuitous use of misunderstood Regietheater stereotypes.

== See also ==
- Regieoper
