= Sviatoslav Richter =

Soviet pianist (1915–1997)

Sviatoslav Richter Святослав Рихтер
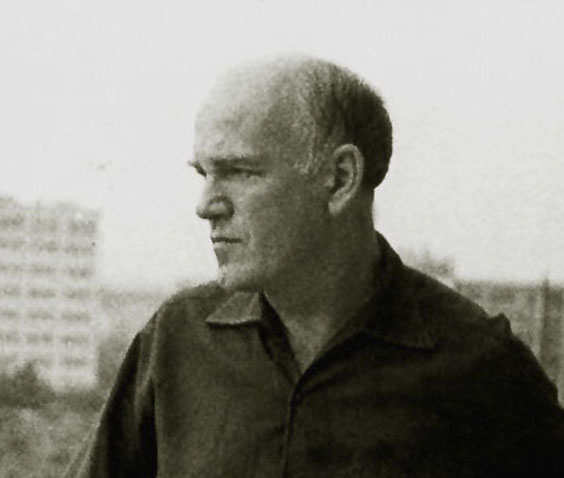
- Richter in 1966

Background information
- Born: Sviatoslav Teofilovich Richter; 20 March 1915; Zhitomir, Volhynia Governorate, Russian Empire
- Died: 1 August 1997 (aged 82) Moscow, Russia
- Genre: Classical
- Instrument: Piano
- Years active: 1934–1995
- Partner: Nina Dorliak (1945–1997)

Sviatoslav Teofilovich Richter (Note: In this name that follows East Slavic naming customs, the patronymic is Teofilovich and the family name is Richter. Russian: Святослав Теофилович Рихтер, romanized: Svyatoslav Teofilovich Rikhter, IPA: [svʲɪtɐsˈɫaf tʲɪɐˈfʲiləvʲɪtɕ ˈrʲixtər]) (20 March [O.S. 7 March] 1915 – August 1, 1997) was a Soviet and Russian classical pianist. Widely considered one of the greatest pianists of the 20th century, he has been praised for the "depth of his interpretations, his virtuoso technique, and his vast repertoire".

== Biography ==
=== Childhood ===
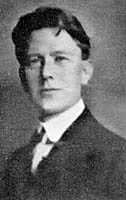
Richter's father, Teofil, c. 1900

Richter was born in Zhitomir in Volhynia Governorate of the Russian Empire (present-day Ukraine), the hometown of his parents. His father, Teofil Danilovich Richter (1872–1941), was a pianist, organist and composer born to German expatriates, who from 1893 to 1900 studied at the Vienna Conservatory. His mother, Anna Pavlovna Richter (née Moskaleva; 1893–1963), came from a noble Russian landowning family, and at one point had studied under her future husband. In 1918, when Richter's parents were in Odessa, the Civil War separated them from their son, and Richter moved in with his aunt Tamara. He lived with her from 1918 to 1921, and it was then that his interest in art first manifested itself: he first became interested in painting, which his aunt taught him.

In 1921 the family was reunited, and the Richters moved to Odessa, where Teofil taught at the Odessa Conservatory and, briefly, worked as organist of a Lutheran church. Richter recalled that his father was appointed to a position at the Odessa Conservatory shortly after his birth. However, a recently identified archival document suggests that Witold Maliszewski may have offered Teofil Richter a position at the conservatory as early as 1914. One of the notable pupils of Teofil Richter was Serafim Orfeyev, who was also a student and later assistant to Mykola Vilinsky, and who emerged as a prominent musicologist, composer and rector of the Odesa Conservatory.

In the early 1920s Richter became interested in music (as well as other art forms such as cinema, literature, and theatre) and started studying piano. Unusually, he was largely self-taught. His father gave him only a basic education in music, as did one of his father's pupils, a Czech harpist.

Even at an early age Richter was an excellent sight-reader and regularly practised with local opera and ballet companies. He developed a lifelong passion for opera, vocal, and chamber music, which found its full expression in the festivals he established in La Grange de Meslay, France, and in Moscow at the Pushkin Museum. At age 15, he started to work at the Odessa Opera, where he accompanied the rehearsals.

=== Early career ===
Richter, c. 1935

On March 19, 1934, Richter gave his first recital, at the Engineers' Club of Odessa, at which he performed an all-Chopin program, including Ballade No. 4 and Etude No. 4. The concert was generally successful, with Richter later recalling that the performance of Chopin's Fourth Ballade was particularly well received, despite his own harsh self-criticism. Although members of the Odessa press were in attendance, the concert received no press coverage.

During that period, Sviatoslav Richter's father, Teofil Richter, was repeatedly humiliated and subjected to abuse at the Odessa Conservatory. Despite being an exceptionally gifted pianist and composer and a graduate of the Vienna Conservatory, he was prohibited from teaching piano to piano students. The identities of those responsible have not been disclosed publicly to this day.

Sviatoslav Richter did not formally start studying piano until three years later, when he decided to seek out Heinrich Neuhaus, a pianist and piano teacher, at the Moscow Conservatory. During Richter's audition for Neuhaus, at which he performed Beethoven's Sonata No. 28 and a few of his own compositions, Neuhaus whispered to a fellow student, "I believe he is a musician of genius." Although Neuhaus taught many pianists, including Emil Gilels and Radu Lupu, it is said that he considered Richter to be "the genius pupil, for whom he had been waiting all his life", while acknowledging that he taught Richter "almost nothing".

Early in his career Richter also tried composition, and it even appears that he played some of his works during his audition for Neuhaus. He gave up composition shortly after moving to Moscow. Years later, Richter explained this decision as follows: "Perhaps the best way I can put it is that I see no point in adding to all the bad music in the world".

By the beginning of World War II Richter's parents' marriage had failed and his mother had fallen in love with another man. Because Richter's father was a German, he was under suspicion by the authorities and a plan was made for the family to be evacuated. Due to her romantic involvement, his mother did not want to leave and so they remained in Odessa. In August 1941, his father was arrested and later found guilty after being falsely accused of espionage; he was sentenced to death and executed on October 6, 1941. Sviatoslav Richter was separated from his mother for nearly 20 years after she left Odessa with retreating German forces, only reuniting with her shortly before her death during his first American concert tour. Because of the tragic fate of his father, Sviatoslav Richter vowed never to perform in Odessa again—a promise he kept. A recording has been preserved in which Sviatoslav Richter plays his father's music.

In 1943 Richter met Nina Dorliak (1908–1998), an operatic soprano. He noticed Dorliak during the memorial service for Vladimir Nemirovich-Danchenko, caught up with her in the street and suggested that he accompany her in recital. Although it is often alleged that they married around this time, they never officially registered their marriage. They remained living companions from around 1945 until Richter's death; they had no children. According to Michel Krielaars, "Their relationship was purely platonic". Dorliak accompanied Richter both in his complex private life and career. She supported him in his final illness, and died herself less than a year later, on May 17, 1998.

Since his death it has been suggested that Richter was homosexual and that having a female companion provided a social front for his true sexual orientation, because homosexuality was widely taboo at that time and could result in legal repercussions. Michel Krielaars quotes three people who knew Richter personally and said that "of course" he was gay. Richter was an intensely private person and was usually quiet and withdrawn, and refused to give interviews. He never publicly discussed his personal life until the last year of his life when film-maker Bruno Monsaingeon convinced him to be interviewed for a documentary.

=== Rise to international profile ===
In 1950 Richter won the Stalin Prize, which led to extensive concert tours in Russia, Eastern Europe and China. He gave his first concerts outside the Soviet Union in Czechoslovakia in 1950. In 1952, Richter was invited to play Franz Liszt in a film based on the life of Mikhail Glinka, called The Composer Glinka (remake of the 1946 film Glinka). The title role was played by Boris Smirnov.

On February 18, 1952, Richter made his sole appearance as a conductor in the world premiere of Prokofiev's Symphony-Concerto for Cello and Orchestra in E minor, with Mstislav Rostropovich as the soloist.

In April 1958 Richter was on the jury of the first Tchaikovsky Competition in Moscow. Watching Van Cliburn's performance of Rachmaninoff's Concerto No. 3, Richter wept with joy; he awarded Cliburn a 25, a perfect score.

In 1960, even though he had a reputation for being "indifferent" to politics, Richter defied the authorities when he performed at Boris Pasternak's funeral.

Having received the Stalin and Lenin prizes and become People's Artist of the RSFSR, he gave his first tour concerts in the US in 1960, and in England and France in 1961.

=== Touring and recording ===
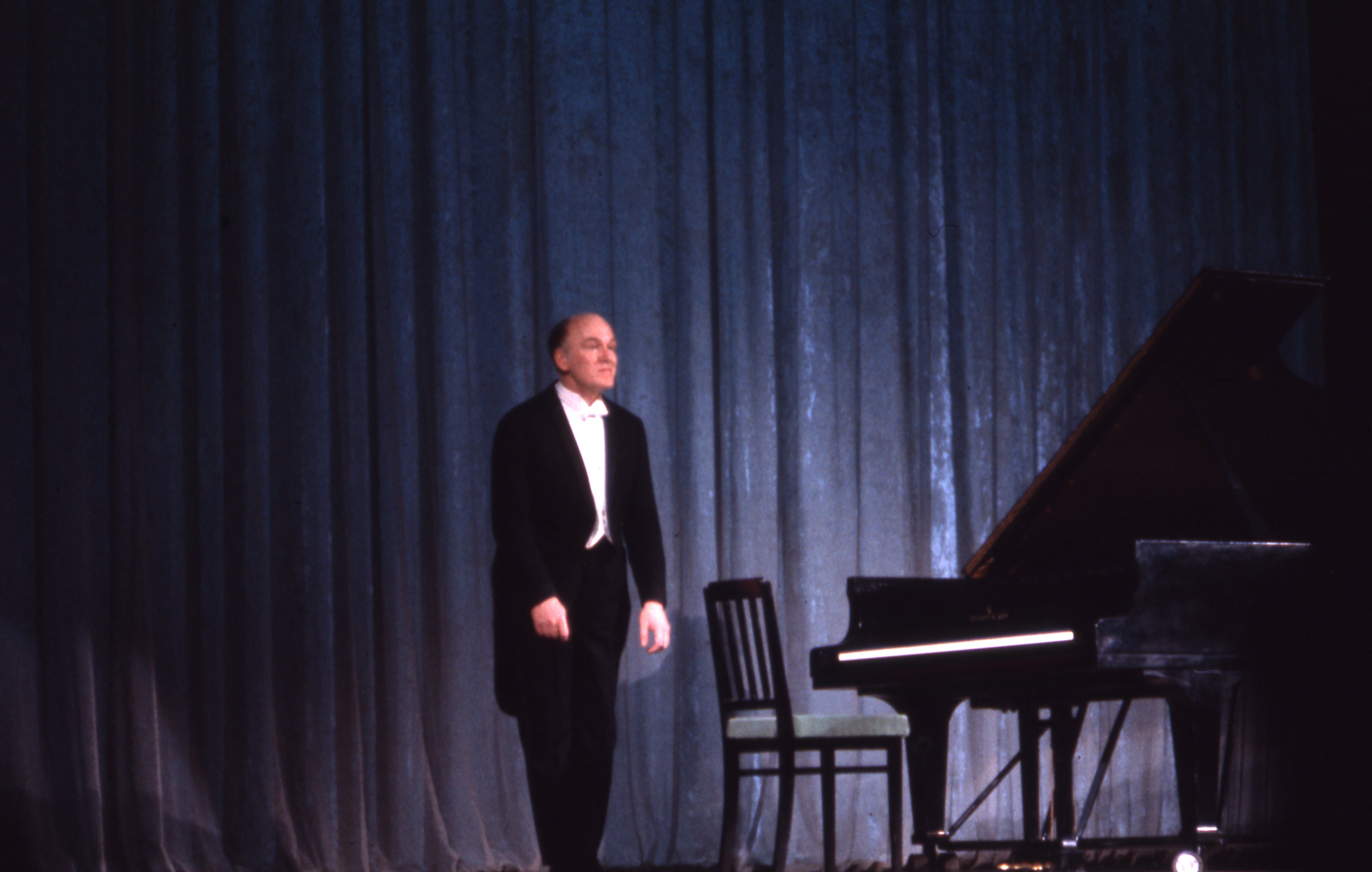
Richter performing in 1964

In 1948 Richter and Dorliak gave recitals in Bucharest, Romania, then in 1950 performed in Prague and Bratislava, Czechoslovakia. In 1954, Richter gave recitals in Budapest, Hungary. In 1956, he again toured Czechoslovakia, then in 1957, he toured China, then again performed in Prague, Sofia, and Warsaw. In 1958, Richter recorded Prokofiev's 5th Piano Concerto with the Warsaw Philharmonic Orchestra under the baton of Witold Rowicki – the recording which made Richter known in the United States. In 1959, Richter made another successful recording of Rachmaninoff's 2nd Piano Concerto with the Warsaw Philharmonic on Deutsche Grammophon label. Thus the West first became aware of Richter through recordings made in the 1950s. One of Richter's first advocates in the West was Emil Gilels, who stated during his first tour of the United States that the critics (who were giving Gilels rave reviews) should "wait until you hear Richter."

Richter's first concerts in the West took place in May 1960, when he was allowed to play in Finland, and on October 15, 1960, in Chicago, where he played Brahms's 2nd Piano Concerto with the Chicago Symphony Orchestra and Erich Leinsdorf, creating a sensation. In a review, Chicago Tribune music critic Claudia Cassidy, who was known for her unkind reviews of established artists, recalled Richter first walking on stage hesitantly, looking vulnerable (as if about to be "devoured"), but then sitting at the piano and dispatching "the performance of a lifetime". The resulting recording won the Grammy Award for Best Classical Performance – Concerto or Instrumental Soloist for that year.

Richter's 1960 tour of the United States culminated in a highly acclaimed series of concerts at Carnegie Hall, the 25 October 1960 recital being particularly praised.

Richter disliked performing in the United States. Following a 1970 incident at Carnegie Hall in New York City, when Richter's performance alongside David Oistrakh was disrupted by anti-Soviet protests, Richter vowed never to return. Rumours of a planned return to Carnegie Hall surfaced in the last years of Richter's life, although it is not clear whether there was any truth behind them.

In 1961 Richter played for the first time in London. His first recital, pairing works of Haydn and Prokofiev, was received with hostility by British critics. Neville Cardus concluded that Richter's playing was "provincial", and wondered why Richter had been invited to play in London, given that London had plenty of "second class" pianists of its own. Following a July 18, 1961, concert, where Richter performed both of Liszt's piano concertos, the critics reversed course. The resulting recording with the London Symphony Orchestra conducted by Kirill Kondrashin was acclaimed by many critics as the best ever made of those works.

In 1963 after searching in the Loire Valley, France, for a venue suitable for a music festival, Richter discovered La Grange de Meslay, several kilometres north of Tours. The festival was established by Richter and became an annual event. While in France, Richter recorded a highly acclaimed performance of Schubert's Wanderer Fantasy.

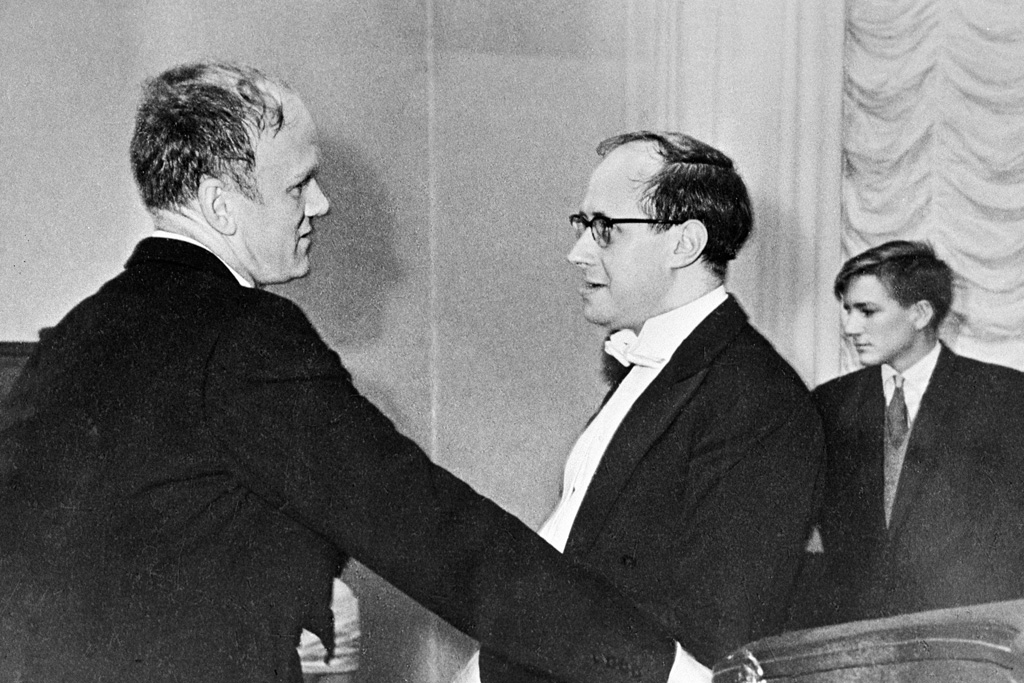
Ricter with Mstislav Rostropovich, 28 September 1965

In 1970 Richter visited Japan for the first time, travelling across Siberia by railway and ship as he disliked flying. He played Beethoven, Schumann, Mussorgsky, Prokofiev, Bartók and Rachmaninoff, as well as works by Mozart and Beethoven with Japanese orchestras. He visited Japan eight times.

Richter's repertoire included many works from the modern era. On 14 June 1969 Richter performed the Ravel Piano Concerto for the Left Hand at Genoa with Riccardo Muti conducting the Orchestra Sinfonica del Teatro Comunale di Genova.

=== Later years ===
In 1981 Richter initiated the international December Nights music festival, held at the Pushkin Museum, which after his death in 1997 was renamed December Nights of Sviatoslav Richter.

In 1986 Richter embarked on a six-month tour of Siberia with his beloved Yamaha piano, giving perhaps 150 recitals, at times performing in small towns that did not even have a concert hall. It is said that after one such concert, the members of the audience, who had never before heard classical music performed, gathered in the middle of the hall and started swaying from side to side to celebrate the performer.

In his last years Richter gave a few concerts for students that were free of charge (February 14, 1990: Teatro Romea, Murcia, Spain, also March 1, 1990: matinee concert in Teatre Municipal, Girona, Spain).

An anecdote illustrates Richter's approach to performance in the last decade of his life. After reading a biography of Charlemagne (he was an avid reader), Richter had his secretary send a telegram to the director of the theater in Aachen, Charlemagne's favoured residence city and his burial place, stating "The Maestro has read a biography of Charlemagne and would like to play at Aquisgrana (Aachen)". The performance took place shortly thereafter.

While he very much enjoyed performing for an audience, Richter hated planning concerts years in advance, and in later life took to playing at very short notice in small, most often darkened halls, with only a small lamp lighting the score. Richter said that this setting helped the audience focus on the music being performed, rather than on extraneous and irrelevant matters such as the performer's grimaces and gestures.

As late as 1995, Richter continued to perform some of the most demanding pieces in the pianistic repertoire, including Ravel's Miroirs cycle, Prokofiev's Second Sonata and Chopin's études, Ballade No. 4, and Schumann's Toccata.

Richter's last recorded orchestral performance was of three Mozart concerti in 1994 with the Japan Shinsei Symphony Orchestra conducted by his old friend Rudolf Barshai.

Richter's last recital was a private gathering in Lübeck, Germany, on March 30, 1995. The program consisted of two Haydn sonatas and Reger's Variations and Fugue on a Theme by Beethoven, a piece for two pianos, which Richter performed with pianist Andreas Lucewicz.

=== Death ===
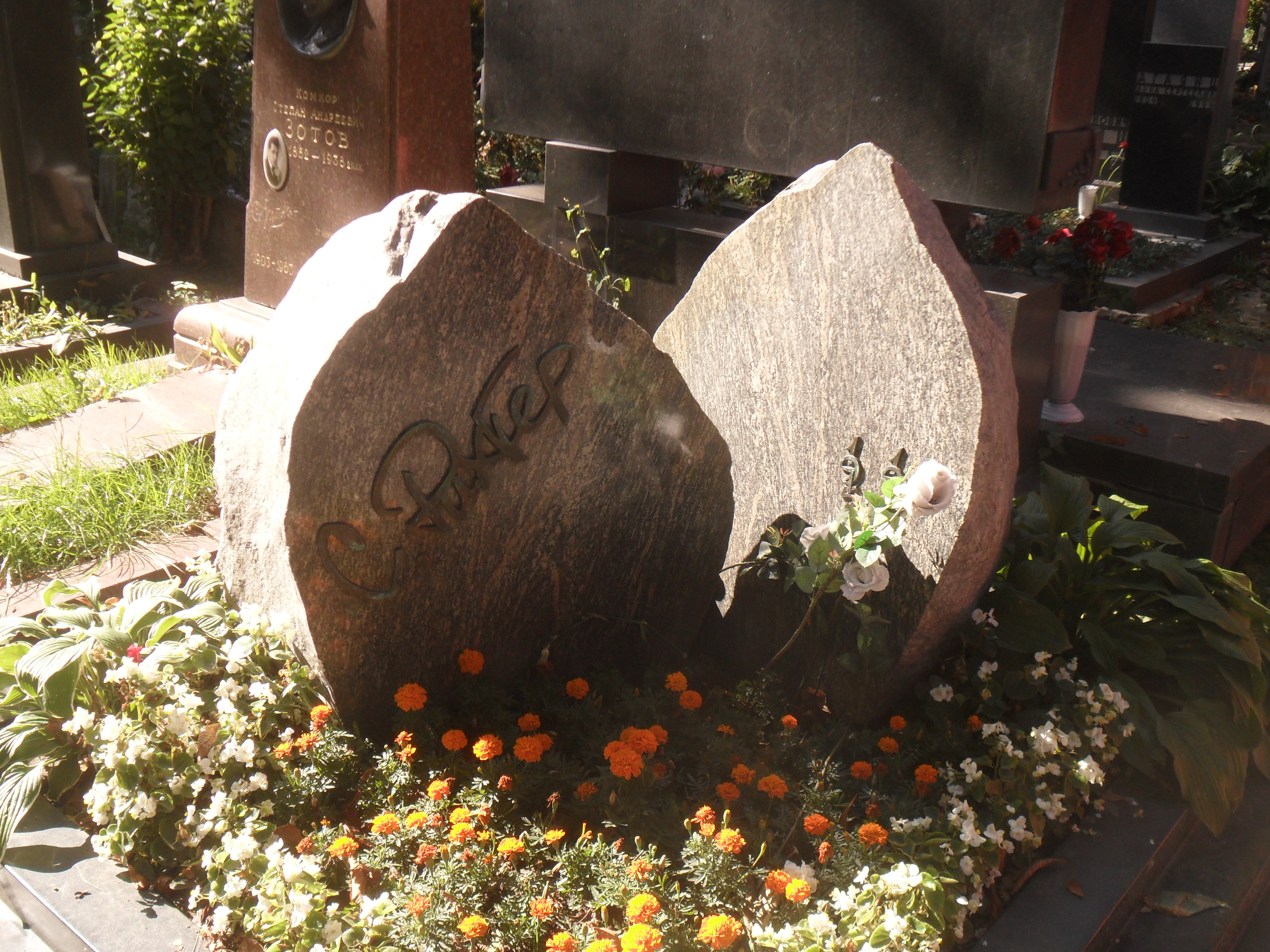
Richter's grave at Novodevichy cemetery in Moscow

Richter died at Central Clinical Hospital in Moscow from a heart attack on August 1, 1997, aged 82. He had been suffering from depression due to an inability to perform caused by changes in his hearing that altered his perception of pitch. At the time of his death he was rehearsing Schubert's Fünf Klavierstücke, D. 459.

== Repertoire ==
Wanderer Fantasy
In this 1963 studio recording of Schubert's Wanderer Fantasy, Richter demonstrates his technique and interpretive ability as he moves from the end of the third movement into the beginning of the finale.

As Richter once put it, "My repertory runs to around eighty different programs, not counting chamber works." His repertoire ranged from Handel and Bach to Tchaikovsky, Scriabin, Szymanowski, Berg, Webern, Stravinsky, Bartók, Hindemith, Britten, and Gershwin.

Richter worked tirelessly to learn new pieces. For instance, in the late 1980s, he learned Brahms's Paganini and Handel Variations, and in the 1990s, several of Debussy's études and pieces by Gershwin, and works by Bach and Mozart that he had not previously included in his programs.

Central to his repertoire were the works of Schubert, Schumann, Beethoven, J. S. Bach, Chopin, Liszt, Prokofiev and Debussy. He is said to have learned and memorized the second book of Bach's The Well-Tempered Clavier in one month.

He gave the premiere of Prokofiev's Sonata No. 7, which he learned in four days, and No. 9, which Prokofiev dedicated to Richter. Apart from his solo career, he also performed chamber music with partners such as Mstislav Rostropovich, Rudolf Barshai, David Oistrakh, Oleg Kagan, Yuri Bashmet, Natalia Gutman, Zoltán Kocsis, Elisabeth Leonskaja, Benjamin Britten and members of the Borodin Quartet. Richter also often accompanied singers such as Dietrich Fischer-Dieskau, Peter Schreier, Galina Pisarenko and his partner and long-time artistic companion Nina Dorliak.

Richter also conducted the premiere of Prokofiev's Symphony-Concerto for cello and orchestra. This was his sole appearance as a conductor. The soloist was Rostropovich, to whom the work was dedicated. Prokofiev also wrote his 1949 Cello Sonata in C for Rostropovich, and he and Richter premiered it in 1950.

== Approach to performance ==
Richter explained his approach to performance as follows: "The interpreter is really an executant, carrying out the composer's intentions to the letter. He doesn't add anything that isn't already in the work. If he is talented, he allows us to glimpse the truth of the work that is in itself a thing of genius and that is reflected in him. He shouldn't dominate the music, but should dissolve into it." He also wrote: "I am not a complete idiot, but whether from weakness or laziness have no talent for thinking. I know only how to reflect: I am a mirror ... Logic does not exist for me. I float on the waves of art and life and never really know how to distinguish what belongs to the one or the other or what is common to both. Life unfolds for me like a theatre presenting a sequence of somewhat unreal sentiments; while the things of art are real to me and go straight to my heart."

Richter's belief that musicians should "carry ... out the composer's intentions to the letter", led him to be critical of others and, most often, himself. After attending a recital of Murray Perahia, where Perahia performed Chopin's Third Piano Sonata without observing the first movement repeat, Richter asked him backstage to explain the omission. Similarly, after Richter realised that he had been playing a wrong note in Bach's Italian Concerto for decades, he insisted that the following disclaimer/apology be printed on a CD containing a performance thereof: "Just now Sviatoslav Richter realised, much to his regret, that he always made a mistake in the third measure before the end of the second part of the 'Italian Concerto'. As a matter of fact, through forty years – and no musician or technician ever pointed it out to him – he played 'F-sharp' rather than 'F'. The same mistake can be found in the previous recording made by Maestro Richter in the fifties."

== Recordings ==
External videos
- Richter performing live (London, 1989) Chopin's 12 Études, Op. 10 and 12 Études, Op. 25

Despite his large discography, Richter disliked making studio recordings, and most of his recordings originate from live performances. Thus, his live recitals from Moscow (1948), Warsaw (1954 and 1972), Sofia (1958), New York City (1960), Leipzig (1963), Aldeburgh (multiple years), la Grange de Meslay near Tours (multiple years), Prague (multiple years), Salzburg (1977) and Amsterdam (1986), are considered among the finest documents of his playing, as are other live recordings issued during his lifetime and since his death on labels including Music & Arts, BBC Legends, Philips, Russia Revelation, Parnassus, and Ankh Productions.

Other critically acclaimed live recordings by Richter include performances of Scriabin's selected études, preludes and sonatas (multiple performances), Schumann's C major Fantasy (multiple performances), Beethoven's Piano Sonata No. 23 (Moscow, 1960), Schubert's B-flat Sonata (multiple performances), Mussorgsky's Pictures at an Exhibition (Sofia, 1958), Ravel's Miroirs (Prague, 1965), Liszt's B minor Sonata (multiple performances, 1965–66), Beethoven's Piano Sonata No. 29 (multiple performances, 1975) and selected preludes by Rachmaninoff (multiple performances) and Debussy (multiple performances).

Despite his professed aversion for the studio, Richter took the recording process seriously. For instance, after a long recording session for Schubert's Wanderer Fantasy, for which he had used a Bösendorfer piano, Richter listened to the tapes and, dissatisfied with his performance, told the recording engineer "Well, I think we'll remake it on the Steinway after all". Similarly, during a recording session for Schumann's Toccata, Richter reportedly chose to play this piece (which Schumann himself considered "among the most difficult pieces ever written") several times in a row, without taking any breaks, to preserve the spontaneity of his interpretation.

According to Falk Schwartz and John Berrie's 1983 article "Sviatoslav Richter – A Discography", in the 1970s, Richter announced his intention of recording his complete solo repertoire "on some 50 discs". This "complete" Richter project did not come to fruition, however, although twelve LPs worth of recordings were made between 1970 and 1973 and were subsequently reissued (in CD format) by Olympia (various composers, 10 CDs) and RCA Victor (Bach's The Well-Tempered Clavier).

In 1961, Richter's RCA Victor recording with Erich Leinsdorf and the Chicago Symphony Orchestra of the Brahms Piano Concerto No. 2 won the Grammy Award for Best Classical Performance – Concerto or Instrumental Soloist. That recording is still considered a landmark (despite Richter's dissatisfaction with it), as are his studio recordings of Schubert's Wanderer Fantasy, Liszt's two Piano Concertos, Rachmaninoff's Second Piano Concerto and Schumann's Toccata, among many others.

== In film ==
Richter appeared in a 1952 Soviet film, playing Liszt in Kompozitor Glinka (The Composer Glinka; Russian: Композитор Глинка).

He can be seen and heard practicing Chopin's Ballade No. 1, as well as chatting (in German) with John Browning, in the documentary Spoleto 1967.

Bruno Monsaingeon interviewed Richter in 1995 (two years before his death) and the documentary The Enigma was released in 1998.

== Reception ==
=== Memorable statements about Richter ===
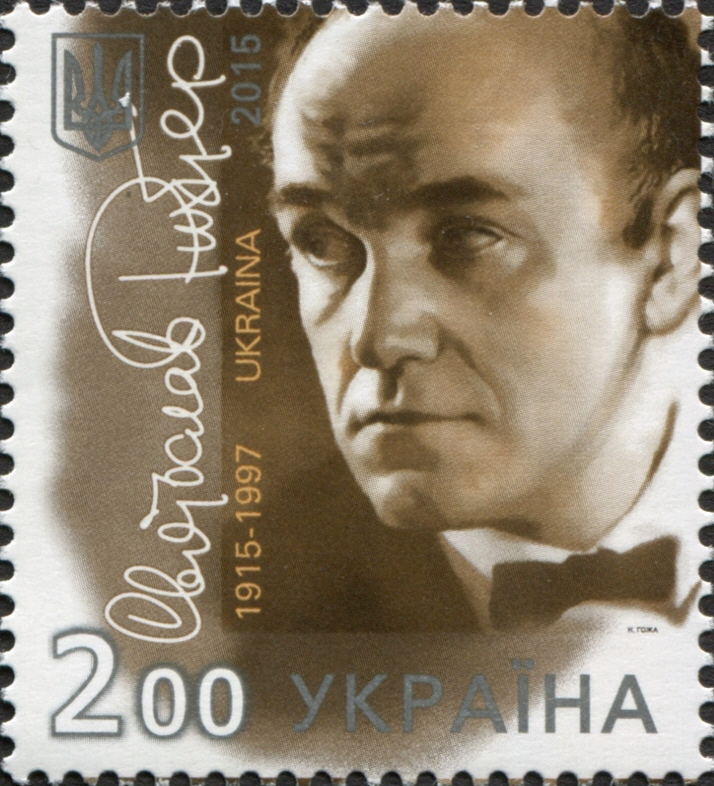
2015 Ukrainian Stamp commemorating the birth of Richter

The Italian critic Piero Rattalino has asserted that the only pianists comparable to Richter in the history of piano performance were Franz Liszt and Ferruccio Busoni.

Glenn Gould called Richter "one of the most powerful communicators the world of music has produced in our time".

Nathan Milstein described Richter in his memoir From Russia to the West as the following: "Richter was certainly a marvellous pianist but not as impeccable as he was reputed to be. His music making was too dry for me. In Richter's interpretation of Ravel's Jeux d'eau, instead of flowing water you hear frozen icicles."

Van Cliburn attended a Richter recital in 1958 in the Soviet Union. He reportedly wept during the recital and, upon returning to the United States, described Richter's playing as "the most powerful piano playing I have ever heard".

Arthur Rubinstein described his first exposure to Richter as follows: "It really wasn't anything out of the ordinary. Then at some point I noticed my eyes growing moist: tears began rolling down my cheeks."

Heinrich Neuhaus described Richter as follows: "His singular ability to grasp the whole and at the same time miss none of the smallest details of a composition suggests a comparison with an eagle who from his great height can see as far as the horizon and yet single out the tiniest detail of the landscape."

Dmitri Shostakovich wrote of Richter: "Richter is an extraordinary phenomenon. The enormity of his talent staggers and enraptures. All the phenomena of musical art are accessible to him."

Vladimir Sofronitsky proclaimed that Richter was a "genius", prompting Richter to respond that Sofronitsky was a "god".

Vladimir Horowitz said: "Of the Russian pianists, I like only one, Richter."

Pierre Boulez wrote of Richter: "His personality was greater than the possibilities offered to him by the piano, broader than the very concept of complete mastery of the instrument."

Marlene Dietrich, who was Richter's friend, wrote in her autobiography, Marlene: "One evening the audience sat around him on the stage. While he was playing a piece, a woman directly behind him collapsed and died on the spot. She was carried out of the hall. I was deeply impressed by this incident and thought to myself: "What an enviable fate, to die while Richter is playing! What a strong feeling for the music this woman must have had when she breathed out her life!" But Richter did not share this opinion, he was shaken".

Gramophone critic Bryce Morrison described Richter as follows: "Idiosyncratic, plain-speaking, heroic, reserved, lyrical, virtuosic and perhaps above all, profoundly enigmatic, Sviatoslav Richter remains one of the greatest recreative artists of all time."

=== Memorable statements by Richter ===
On listening to Bach: "It does no harm to listen to Bach from time to time, even if only from a hygienic standpoint."

On Scriabin: "Scriabin isn't the sort of composer whom you'd regard as your daily bread, but is a heavy liqueur on which you can get drunk periodically, a poetical drug, a crystal that's easily broken."

On picking small venues for performance: "Put a small piano in a truck and drive out on country roads; take time to discover new scenery; stop in a pretty place where there is a good church; unload the piano and tell the residents; give a concert; offer flowers to the people who have been so kind as to attend; leave again."

On his plan to perform without a fee: "Music must be given to those who love it. I want to give free concerts; that's the answer."

On Neuhaus: "I learned a lot from him, even though he kept saying that there was nothing he could teach me. Music is written to be played and listened to and has always seemed to me to be able to manage without words... This was exactly the case with Heinrich Neuhaus. In his presence I was almost always reduced to total silence. This was an extremely good thing, as it meant that we concentrated exclusively on the music. Above all, he taught me the meaning of silence and the meaning of singing. He said I was incredibly obstinate and did only what I wanted to. It's true that I've only ever played what I wanted. And so he left me to do as I liked."

On playing: "I don't play for the audience, I play for myself, and if I derive any satisfaction from it, then the audience, too, is content."

After playing some Haydn for a television programme while touring in the US, Richter said, after much coaxing by the interviewer and embarrassment on his own part, that Haydn was "better than Mozart".

== Honours and awards ==
- Stalin Prize (1950);
- People's Artist of the RSFSR (1955);
- Grammy Award (1960);
- Lenin Prize (1961);
- People's Artist of the USSR (1961);
- Robert Schumann Prize of the City of Zwickau (1968);
- Honorary Doctor of the University of Strasbourg (1977);
- Léonie Sonning Music Prize (1986; Denmark);
- Hero of Socialist Labour (1975);
- Three Orders of Lenin (1965, 1975, 1985);
- Order of the October Revolution (1980);
- Glinka State Prize of the RSFSR (1987) – for concert programmes in 1986, performed in the cities of Siberia and the Far East;
- Order of Merit for the Fatherland, 3rd class (1995);
- Russian Federation State Prize (1996);
- Commander of the Order of Arts and Letters (France);
- Doctor of Music, honoris causa Oxford University;
- Voted into the Gramophone Hall of Fame in 2012;
- A minor planet, 9014 Svyatorichter, was named after him.
