= Boris Shtokolov =

Soviet and Russian opera singer (1930–2005)

- Борис Штоколов
- Boris Shtokolov
- Born: Boris Timofeyevich Shtokolov; March 19, 1930; Kuzedeyevo, Novokuznetsky District, Siberian Krai, Russian SFSR, Soviet Union
- Died: January 6, 2005 (aged 74); Saint Petersburg, Russia
- Occupation: Opera singer
- Years active: 1950s–1990s
- Title: People's Artist of the USSR (1966)

Boris Timofeyevich Shtokolov (Russian: Бори́с Тимофе́евич Што́колов; March 19, 1930 – January 6, 2005), was a famous Soviet and Russian singer.

Boris Shtokolov was born in the settlement of Kuzedeyevo in Gorno-Shorsky District of Kuznetsk Okrug in Siberian Krai (now in Novokuznetsky District of Kemerovo Oblast). In 1949, he entered the Ural State Conservatory in Sverdlovsk (now Yekaterinburg), but wanted to become a military pilot. Georgy Zhukov, having heard his singing, said: There are many guys like you in aviation, but in opera singing you are unique. In 1950 and 1951, he was singing at the Sverdlovsk Philharmonic Society before he became a soloist at the Sverdlovsk Opera and Ballet Theater. In 1959, he was invited to the Kirov Theater in Leningrad (now St. Petersburg) where he gained world fame as a leading soloist from 1959 to 1989. At the Kirov Theater he sang a great number of roles, such as Ruslan, Don Basilio, Boris Godunov, Ivan Susanin, the title role in Anton Rubinstein's The Demon, Prince Gremin, Mefistofele, and many others.

He died on 6 January 2005 in St. Petersburg, and was buried at the Literatorskie Mostki of the Volkovo Cemetery.

Boris Shtokolov was also a prominent theorist of opera singing and breathing techniques. In 1995, he published a book Burn, Burn, My Star: How to Sing.

== Honors ==
- People's Artist of the USSR (1966)
- USSR State Prize (1981)
- Order of Lenin (1980)
- Order of the October Revolution (1983)
- Order of the Red Banner of Labor (twice)
- Order of the Patriotic War (2nd class)
- Honorary Member of the Slavic Academy
- Honorary Citizen of the Kemerovo Oblast (2002)
