= Parallel Voices =

2005 film by Rustam Khamdamov

- Directed by: Rustam Khamdamov
- Written by: Rustam Khamdamov; Renata Litvinova
- Produced by: Aleksandr Vaynshteyn; Galina Kuzembayeva
- Starring: Renata Litvinova; Erik Kurmangaliev
- Cinematography: Rifkat Ibragimov; Sergey Mokritskiy
- Edited by: Rustam Khamdamov
- Music by: Vladimir Martynov
- Production company: Kazakhfilm
- Release date: 2005
- Running time: 65 minutes
- Country: Kazakhstan
- Language: Russian

Parallel Voices (Russian: Вокальные параллели, romanized: Vokaldy paralelder) is a 2005 Kazakhstani musical drama film written and directed by Rustam Khamdamov. It was the first film directed by Khamdamov after a 14 years hiatus. It was entered into the Horizons section at the 62nd edition of the Venice Film Festival.

== Plot ==
A group of Russian artists met in a desolate hangar, where they will alternate classical arias and discussions about the sense of life.

== Cast ==
- Renata Litvinova as herself
- Roza Dzhamanova as herself
- Bibigul Tulegenova as herself
- Erik Kurmangaliev as himself
- Araks Davtyan as herself
