= Alla Ablaberdyeva =

Russian classical soprano

Alla Ablaberdyeva (Russian: Алла Аблабердыева; born 7 May 1953) is a Russian classical soprano who specializes in chamber music.

== Biography ==
Ablaberdyeva studied at the Moscow Conservatoire under Nina Dorliak. After completing her studies she won several international singing competitions including the All-Union Mikhail Glinka Competition of Musicians in Moscow. Throughout the 1980s she sang regularly as a soloist with the Moscow Philharmonic Society and appeared regularly in chamber music concerts in Moscow and Leningrad. She also toured the USSR, Czech Republic, Hungary, Cuba, Sweden, and France during this time. She relocated to London in 1991 and her career has since been centered there. A singing teacher, among her students is the singer/songwriter Mika.

== Recordings ==
Ablaberdyeva has made several recordings including Stravinsky's Les Noces, several cantatas by Giovanni Battista Pergolesi and Antonio Vivaldi, art songs by various Russian composers, and numerous works by J.S. Bach, Henry Purcell and George Frideric Handel, mostly on the Melodiya label. A CD of songs by Tchaikovsky was made at All Saints Church, Tudely, Kent, UK.

== Sources ==
- Biography of Alla Ablaberdyeva at bach-cantatas.com
- Personal site Alla Ablaberdyeva
