= Felix Korobov =

Russian conductor and cellist

- Феликс Коробов
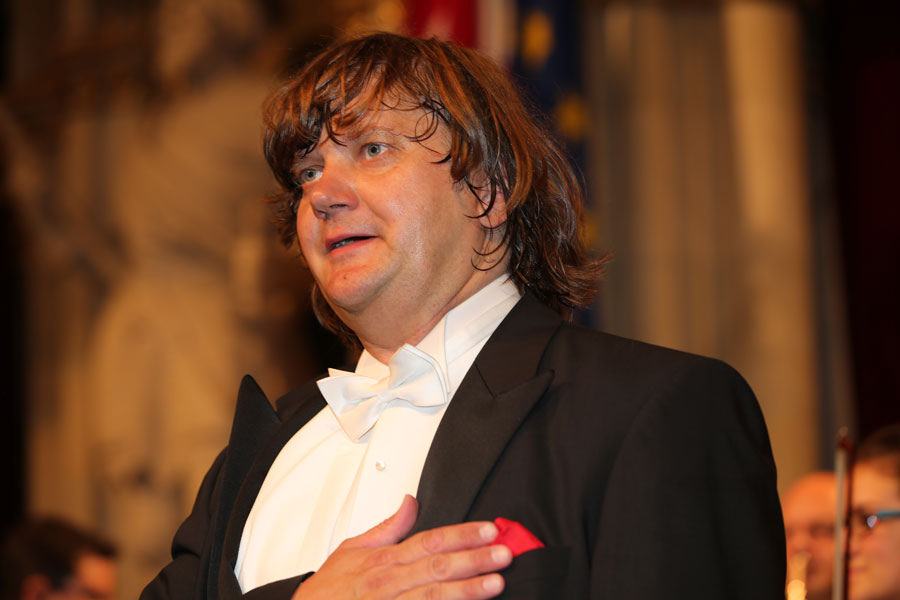
- Korobov in 2014
- Born: May 24, 1972 (age 53)
- Education: Moscow Conservatory
- Occupations: Conductor and cellist

Felix Pavlovich Korobov (Russian: Феликс Павлович Коробов; born 24 May 1972) is a Russian conductor and cellist.

== Biography ==
Korobov is a graduate of the Moscow Conservatory, cello (1996) and conducting (2002), he was the conductor of the State Academic Symphony Orchestra of Russia (Svetlanov Symphony Orchestra) and joined the Stanislavsky and Nemirovich-Danchenko Moscow Academic Music Theatre in 1999 and the Novaya Opera Theatre in 2003, becoming its principal conductor between 2004 and 2006. Korobov regularly conducts a repertoire of over thirty operas in the theatres of Moscow and as of 2011 he is chief conductor of the Stanislavsky and Nemirovich-Danchenko Moscow Music Theatre and often tours as a conductor and cellist. He has recorded about 20 CDs as of 2011.

He was awarded by the International Contest of Chamber Ensembles in Druskininkai, Lithuania (2002) and is an Honored Artist of Russia (2020).

Korobov is the Honored Artist of the Republic of Abkhazia (2012).
