= Vladimir Kobekin =

Russian composer

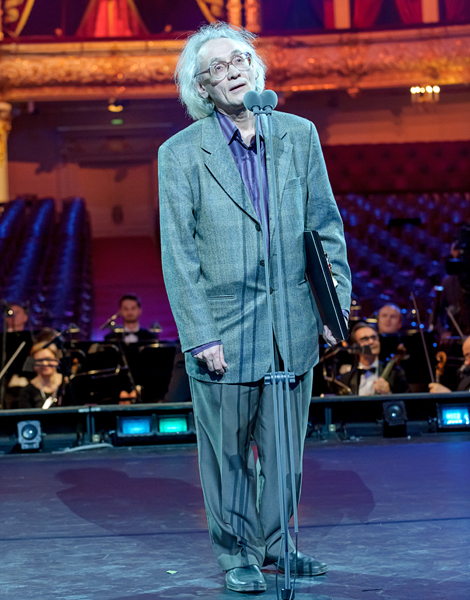
Vladimir Kobekin

Vladimir Aleksandrovich Kobekin (Владимир Александрович Кобекин) (b. 22 July 1947, Berezniki) is a Russian composer best known for his opera compositions.

He studied under Sergei Slonimsky at the Leningrad Conservatory. After graduating in 1971 he taught music composition at the Urals Mussorgsky State Conservatoire (1971–1980). From 1992 to 1995 he served as chairman of the Ural branch of the Union of Soviet Composers. Since 1995 he has been a senior lecturer in the composition department at the Urals Mussorgsky State Conservatoire. Among his notable pupils is opera composer Anastasia Bespalova. In 1987 he won the Honoured Representative of the Arts Award, and later that year he was made a laureate of the USSR State Prize.

== Works ==
=== Operas ===
- Hamlet (Danish) a (Russian) Comedy ("Гамлет Датский, или Российская комедия") - musical comedy. premiered at the Stanislavski and Nemirovich-Danchenko Moscow Academic Music Theatre in 2008.
- Margarita "Маргарита"
- The Prophet ("Пророк") libretto after Pushkin; 1984 Sverdlovsk Opera, conductor Titel.
- Pugachev ("Пугачев") from the poem by Sergei Esenin; 1983, Leningrad, Maly Opera and Ballet Theater
- Swan Song ("Лебединая песня") 1980, Moscow Chamber Musical Theatre, after Anton Chekhov.
- Diary of a Madman ("Дневник сумасшедшего") 1980, after Lu Xun
- The Idiot ("Идиот") 1995, after Dostoevsky

== Sources ==
- Alla Vladimirovna Grigor′yeva. "Kobekin, Vladimir Aleksandrovich", in Grove Dictionary of Music and Musicians.
