= Erik Kurmangaliev =

Russian actor and opera singer

Background information
- Born: 2 January 1959; Kulsary, Kazakh SSR, Soviet Union
- Died: 13 November 2007 (aged 48) Moscow, Russia
- Occupation: Opera singer

Erik Kurmangaliev (2 January 1959 – 13 November 2007) was a Soviet-Kazakh opera singer, actor and a leading public figure in Russia's perestroika music scene.

== Early life ==
Kurmangaliev was born in Kazakhstan, which at the time was part of the Soviet Union. He attended a music conservatory in the city of Almaty, and later transferred to the Gnessin State Musical College in Moscow. He was known for an unusual countertenor voice.

== Career ==
Kurmangaliev debuted in 1980 at the Leningrad Philharmonia. He later performed in Alfred Shnitke's Second Symphony and Dr. Faust cantata during his career. His career reached his peak when he teamed up with director Roman Viktyuk in the early 1990s, when he appeared in the Russian language version of David Hwang's M. Butterfly. Kurmangaliev made his last appearance in film appearance in Rustam Khamdamov's Parallel Voices.

At one time, Kurmangaliev acted under nickname Erik Salim-Meruert, which are the combined names of his father and mother.

== Death ==
He died in Moscow on November 13, 2007, of a liver infection at the age of 47.
