= Vsevolod Nemolyaev =

Russian ballet dancer (1937–2025)

Vsevolod Vladimirovich Nemolyaev (Russian: Всеволод Владимирович Немоляев; 22 February 1937 – 15 January 2025) was a Russian ballet dancer and director of the Bolshoi Theatre. He died on 15 January 2025 at the age of 87.

His half-sister is theater and film actress Svetlana Nemolayeva.

== Awards ==
- Order of the Badge of Honour (1976)
- Honoured Cultural Worker of the RSFSR (1985)
