= Vitaliy Hubarenko =

Vitaliy Serhiyovych Hubarenko Віталій Сергійович Губаренко
- Born: June 13, 1934; Kharkiv, Ukrainian SSR, Soviet Union
- Died: April 5, 2000 (aged 65) Kyiv, Ukraine
- Genres: Classical
- Occupation: Composer
- Instrument: Singing

Vitaliy Serhiyovych Hubarenko (Note: Ukrainian: Віталій Сергійович Губаренко, romanized: Vitalii Serhiiovych Hubarenko) (13 June 1934 – 5 April 2000) was a Ukrainian composer.

== Life and works ==
Born in Kharkiv, he graduated from the Kharkiv Conservatory in 1960, where he had studied under Dmitri Klebanov. He was awarded the Ostrovsky Prize in 1967, and the Taras Shevchenko Prize in 1984. His first opera, Zahybel’ eskadry (‘The Destruction of the Squadron’) (1966) brought him to public attention.

His compositions include operas (of which he wrote many including in 1980 the opera-ballet Viy, Reborn May (1974), The Reluctant Matchmaker (1985), and Remember, My Brotherhood, described as an opera-oratorio (1990–91)), film music, and Pys’ma lyubvi (Letters to love) (1972), a cycle of four monologues for soprano and chamber ensemble.

Hubarenko died in Kyiv at age 65.

== Sources ==
- Grove Music Online (subscription access).
- Batovska, O.M., Dramaturgy of choral scenes in the operas of Hubarenko, (dissertation at Odesa Music Academy, 2005) (in Ukrainian)
- International Who's Who in Music and Musicians' Directory, (London, 2000), Hubarenko, Vitaly
