= Regieoper =

Regieoper (German: [ʁeˈʒiːˌʔoːpɐ], 'director's opera') is a form of Regietheater specific to opera. In Regieoper, the stage director assumes a central role in determining the concept of an opera, often exchanging the established traditions related to that opera for an approach that may or may not adhere to the composer's or librettist's original intention. The director's approach may include but is not limited to changing the staging intended by the composer or librettist, modernizing the story to reflect contemporary political controversies, and infusing the production with shock value (most often, sexuality).

== History ==
The roots of Regieoper can be traced back to Swiss stage director and designer Adolphe Appia. Appia was a scene design painter who most famously collaborated with Richard Wagner to create the sets for some of his original productions. Aided by the invention of electricity, Appia used light and shade in new ways to create the illusion of three-dimensional sets. He combined color with dynamic light intensity to create a new perspective of scene design and stage lighting. As Adolf Aber sums up, "The whole aim of such a production is—as Appia points out—to get the actor, as the true bearer of the drama, back into the centre of the action." Appia sought to create this effect through the "subtle art of lighting on the stage". His philosophy of actor-centric theater served as inspiration for Wagner's grandson Wieland Wagner when he directed Wagner's operas at the Bayreuth Festival in the 1950s and 1960s. As a director, Wieland's manifestation of this philosophy birthed the theatrical aesthetic of Regieoper.

The role of the director in opera originally arose from the need for a person to fulfill administrative duties. This person primarily dealt with "artistic planning and casting, (in consultation with the composer, if still living) and nominally oversaw all rehearsals and performances". However, the importance of the director as an artistic visionary became increasingly more prominent over the 20th century. Inspired by the vision of Appia's work and the way it complemented Wagner's philosophy of Gesamtkunstwerk, Wieland Wagner mounted minimalistic productions that strove to highlight the psychological interactions of the characters by setting the drama on a mostly bare and stark stage. Wieland Wagner's approach was met with much criticism and controversy, but after his death in 1966 other theater directors latched onto the philosophy, and it became an influential and controversial directorial style in the late 20th century.

== Examples ==
Willy Decker's 2005 Salzburg production of Giuseppe Verdi's La traviata is a fairly tame example of Regieoper. The original story is set in the early 19th century, with opulent sets, and party scenes with both men and women enjoying high society frivolity. Although Violetta is aware of her illness and possible impending death, she mainly concerns herself with flaunting high society rules and dreaming of a life of bliss with her lover, Alfredo, in the country. Decker has updated the story to modern times with a set consisting of only a blue wall and a sofa, desk, and a chair. The chorus is androgynously dressed in tuxedos, rendering them rather dark and menacing. The only women are Violetta and her maid. The most striking change is the giant clock on a wall with the figure of Violetta's doctor in black hovering at the side of the stage throughout the opera. Decker's concept was to change the emphasis from a courtesan trying to find love, to the idea of Death as a constant reminder of our mortality. Even with these changes, however, the original intent and flow of the libretto and Verdi's music remained.

A somewhat more radical approach to Regieoper can be seen in Philipp Himmelmann's 2004 Berlin production of Verdi's Don Carlo. The original plot, which takes place in the mid-1500s, is complicated, weaving elements of personal, political, and theological conflicts, but usually centering on the love conflict between Spain's King Phillip II, his son Don Carlo, and Elizabeth, whom they both desire. Since the Spanish Inquisition is an integral part of the plot, a particularly dramatic scene involves an auto-da-fé. Himmelmann has updated the action, sets, and costumes, giving it a spare and modern look. Most of the action takes place around a dining table against a dark background. The director seems to have added elements that are meant to simply shock. Princess Eboli's Ladies in Waiting have become secret agents who attach silencers to handguns and point them at the audience. During the auto-da-fé scene, nude bodies lie in front of the family table, then are trussed up with rope, hoisted up to the ceiling, and dowsed with gasoline, all while the family goes about their business. As the publication "Mostly Opera" says, "The entire concept revolves around Fillipo's dysfunctional family. One of the major strengths of this production is the visualization of the division between the private and public lives of this modern royal family, as we observe them in both private and public functions."

At the extreme end of the "shock" spectrum lies Calixto Bieito's 2004 Berlin production of Mozart's Die Entführung aus dem Serail. This opera has had many incarnations, even delving into the realm of parody, as evidenced by director Josh Shaw's 2015 production for the Pacific Opera Project wherein the opera is set as a Star Trek episode with tenor Brian Cheney in the starring role as Captain James T. Belmonte. Bieto's production, though, is considered to be the most radical to date.

The inspiration for Mozart's opera was the overwhelming fascination of Europeans by all things Turkish. Orientalist elements abound in this story of a hero trying to rescue two girls from the clutches of an evil Pasha who has installed them in his harem (seraglio). Instead of a genteel harem, Bieito has set this Abduction in a modern, garish bordello where men and women engage in extreme acts of sex and brutality. The sets consist mainly of whorehouse accoutrements, the lighting is colored and garish, and the costumes for the most part are leather pants and bras with a smattering of sexy dressing gowns. In one scene, Osmin seems to cut off a woman's nipple with a knife, in another he forces a woman to drink a cup of urine. Towards the end of the opera, a body appears to be dismembered. Although Bieito seems to add these elements mainly to shock and dismay, he is a director known for trying to express difficult issues, such as sex used as brutality, in a manner that would speak to modern audiences. In this case, it may be effective, but absolutely nothing is left of Mozart's original vision except his divine music.

== Critical reception ==
Many Regie productions are met with critical disdain, as their shocking nature is often perceived as "pandering" to an audience. While these jolting qualities generate publicity and scandal, many critics feel the trend will eventually hurt opera's place in society. Critic Heather Mac Donald calls Regietheater "one of the most depressing artistic developments of our time. It suggests a culture that cannot tolerate its own legacy of beauty and nobility."

Early in their careers, directors like the Alden brothers and Peter Sellars were considered "enfants terribles who emphasized modern dress, striking visuals and visceral theatricality, and had little to do with the company," and thus were ignored by large mainstream institutions, like the Metropolitan Opera. However, as opera companies strive to develop larger audiences, Regie productions are making their way into larger opera houses. This trend is what gives critics like Mac Donald pause about opera's future.

"The list of tone-deaf self-indulgences could be extended indefinitely. Their trashy sex and disjunctive settings are just the symptom, however, of a deeper malady. The most insidious problem with Regietheater is the directors' hatred of Enlightenment values. Where a composer writes lightness and joy, they find a 'subtext' of darkness."

Directors, like David Alden, are often the center of similar critical disdain. Rupert Christiansen calls Alden's production of Tchaikovsky's The Queen of Spades, "relentlessly pretentious but largely rubbishy," while James Tarmy laments that Alden's production of Un ballo in maschera is "seductive as an airport parking lot." Tarmy also comments on the expectations that coincide with a Regie director's work, saying, "I expected a lot from David Alden, a director who once turned Tchaikovsky's Mazeppa into a chainsaw massacre— What a frustrating night, right until the end when Anckarstrom stabbed Gustavo at the masked ball. Gustavo fell, got up, strolled around a bit, then dropped again for his last addio."

While critics like Mac Donald, Christiansen, and Tarmy view Regietheater as an abomination, other critics feel concept opera is part of a rich, spectacle-driven legacy. Chris Mullins calls Alden's production of Ercole Amante "a show that respects the opera's most sincere moments while teasing the opera's titular hero and his less than heroic shenanigans right up to the edges of parody." Mullins feels strongly the composer's original intention for theatrical spectacle is echoed in Alden's concept.
