= Rustam Khamdamov =

- Born: Rustam Usmanovich Khamdamov; May 24, 1944 (age 82); Tashkent, Uzbek SSR, USSR
- Education: Gerasimov Institute of Cinematography
- Occupations: filmmaker screenwriter costume designer set designer
- Years active: 1967–present

Rustam Usmanovich Khamdamov (Russian: Руста́м Усма́нович Хамда́мов, born 24 May 1944 in Tashkent) is a Soviet and Russian film director and artist. His film Anna Karamazoff (1991) was entered into the 1991 Cannes Film Festival.

== Filmography ==
- 1967 — In the Mountains of My Heart (short; student film, at VGIK)
- 1974 — Unintentional Pleasures (unfinished)
- 1991 — Anna Karamazoff
- 2005 — Parallel Voices
- 2010 — Diamonds (short)
- 2010 — The Nutcracker in 3D, as costume designer
- 2017 — The Bottomless Bag
