= Yevgeny Kolobov =

Russian conductor (1946–2003)

Yevgeny Kolobov

Yevgeny Vladimirivich Kolobov (Russian: Евгений Владимирович Колобов; 19 January 1946 – 15 June 2003) was a Russian conductor.

== Career ==
Upon graduation from the song-school under the Glinka Chapel in Leningrad and the Urals State Conservatory, he started his career as a principal conductor in 1974 of the Ekaterinburg Opera and Ballet Theatre (1974–1981).

In 1981, he became a conductor at the world-famous Mariinsky Theatre in St. Petersburg.

In 1987, Evgeny Kolobov was appointed musical director of the Stanislavski and Nemirovich-Danchenko Theatre in Moscow.

In 1991, Evgeny Kolobov and a number of his like-minded colleagues, supported by Moscow Mayor Yuri Luzhkov, founded the Novaya Opera Theatre of Moscow and was its artistic director until his sudden death by heart attack.

One of Kolobov's lifelong ambitions was to revive undeservedly forgotten music and to produce new, modern interpretations of well-known compositions. Yevgeny Kolobov was the first opera conductor in Russia to stage Verdi's La forza del destino, Bellini's Il Pirata, Donizetti's Maria Stuarda, Catalani's La Wally, Verdi's I Due Foscari, Mussorgsky's Boris Godunov in the composer's original version and Thomas's Hamlet. He has also produced new, remarkable stagings of Glinka's Ruslan and Lyudmila, "O Mozart! Mozart..." (based on the opera Mozart and Salieri by Rimsky-Korsakov and Mozart's Requiem), Tchaikovsky's Eugene Onegin, Golovin's First Love (Kolobov's debut as stage director), Verdi's La Traviata.

Kolobov's style of conducting was highly expressive and energetic, he was acclaimed by opera lovers and critics alike as one of the best opera conductors in modern Russia.

== Awards ==
He was awarded the titles Honored Art Worker of Russia (1979) and People's Artist of the RSFSR (1983). Yevgeny Kolobov was honored with the prestige national prizes Triumph and Golden Mask, a special award of the Moscow Government for achievements in the arts and the Order Creator of St. Petersburg. Laureate of the State Prize of the Russian Federation in the field of musical art (2003, posthumously).
