= Novaya Opera Theatre =

Theater in Moscow, Russia

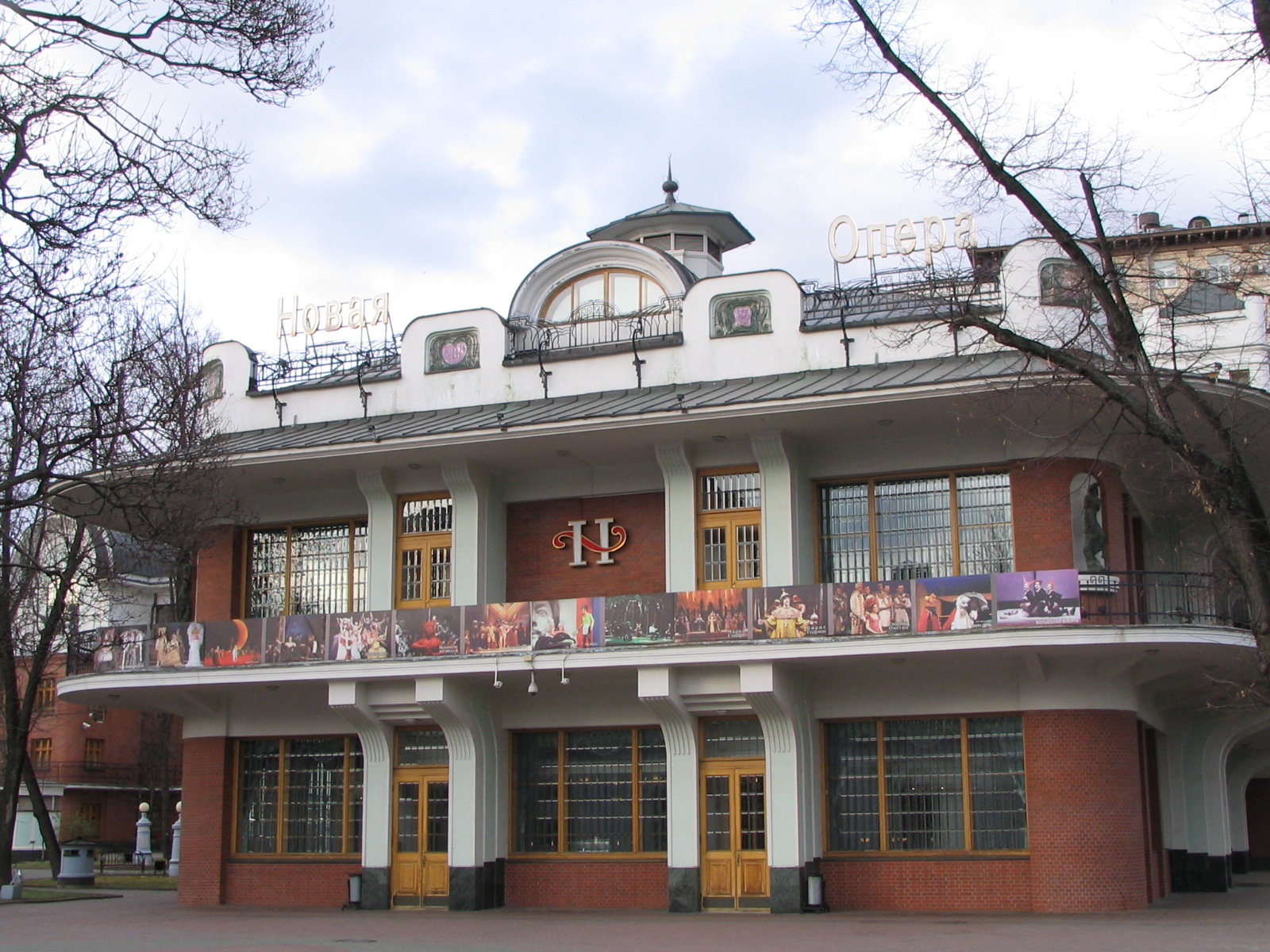

The Kolobov Novaya Opera Theatre of Moscow (Russian: Новая Опера) (novaya means "new") is a theatre in Moscow, located at 3 Karetny Ryad. It was founded in 1991 by Russian conductor Yevgeny Kolobov and then Moscow Mayor Yury Luzhkov. It is accessible via metro from Pushkinskaya, Tverskaya or Mayakovskaya.

The theatre has been a member of the Opera Europa International Association, since 1999.

== History ==
A theatre originally began in the Hermitage Garden in 1892 under the initiative of Yakov Shchukin and opened in 1894 as an open-air theatre. It attracted tens of thousands of people and opera singers, orchestras and circus artistes from across Europe. In 1910, a modernist "Mirror Theatre", designed by Novikov, was inaugurated with a spot designated for open air performances. After the demise of the Soviet Union, the central government passed it to the Novaya opera, who, with the Austrian contractor Lennex and chief architect Vladimir Kotelnikov, built a new theatre, utilising some of the architectural elements of the Mirror Theatre. It opened on 27 December 1997 in a new building with a gala concert featuring artists such as Dmitry Khvorostovsky, Paata Burchuladze, soloists of the Opera Ebony. The premier was viewed by the then mayor of Moscow Yuri Luzhkov, the then Russian President's wife, Naina Yeltsin and other eminent persons.

== Architecture and fittings ==
The building is in the Art Nouveau style. It has a seating capacity of over 700. The Opera Theatre has modern acoustics, lighting, video and audio recording facilities.

== Features ==
The Opera Theatre is organized under three specialized branches namely, the Novaya Opera Soloists, the Novaya Opera Orchestra and the Novaya Opera Choir. The renowned artists drawn from these disciplines undertake tours, under the Theatre's banner, all over the world.

The Novaya Opera Soloists are opera singers of the theatre, many of whom have won accolades for their singing prowess. They also collaborate with other leading theatrical establishments in Russia; the Bolshoi Theatre of Russia, Metropolitan Opera, Arena di Verona are some of the leading theatres where they give performances.

The Orchestra branch is integral to the theatre's operatic performances and involves participation of distinguished conductors of the theatre. This branch also undertakes performances of symphony programmes (the "repertoire" covers symphonies and symphonic compositions of many artists who are well known in the field) in other concert halls also; some the famous halls in Russia are the Grand Hall of the Moscow Conservatory, the Tchaikovsky Concert Hall both in Moscow and the St.Petersburg Philharmonic.

The Novaya Opera Choir provides the essential amalgamation of “professional singers with fine voices and good acting abilities”. Choirmasters of the theater - People's Artist of Russia Natalya Popovich (Main Chorus), Victor Kuturaev, Andrey Lazarev, Igor Manko, Julia Senyukova, Marina Vasilkova in the work with the choir performing tasks pose higher than, of course, bring staff to the level of the best opera choruses of the world. The touring branch of the Opera Theatre has performed in many countries such as Greece, Cyprus, Italy, the United States, France, Israel, Finland, Estonia, Spain, Portugal, Yugoslavia, Turkey, Thailand, Belarus, Ukraine and many cities within Russia.

== Performances ==
Various performance types have been associated with this venue, including opera, orchestral concerts, and ballet. The operas performed at the theatre are almost entirely classical, those of note being Verdi's La traviata, Tchaikovsky's Eugene Onegin, and Rimsky Korsakov's Snow Maiden. The theatre plays host to an annual “Epiphany Week” festival, which runs for slightly more than two weeks.

== Notable people ==
Yevgeny Kolobov (1991–2003) was its first conductor until his death in 2003. Subsequent conductors have been Felix Korobov (2004–2006) and Eri Klas (2006–present). Eri Klas is the theatre's music director. The artistic staff includes Natalya Popovich who is head of the theatre's Artistic Board and serves as Chief Choirmaster. Sergey Lysenko was the initial general director, while Valery Raku was the vice-director and chief of casting.

== Awards ==
The theatre has the honour of receiving many awards, some of the notable ones are the Sony BMG Greece Award and the theatrical award "Week Star" bestowed by the German newspaper “Abendzeitung”, apart from many prestigious awards of Russia like the Casta Diva Russian opera prize and the national prize "Triumph" given to Evgeny Kolobov.
