= Stanislavski and Nemirovich-Danchenko Theatre =

Performing arts theatre and company in Moscow

- Московский академический Музыкальный театр имени народных артистов К. С. Станиславского и Вл. И. Немировича-Данченко
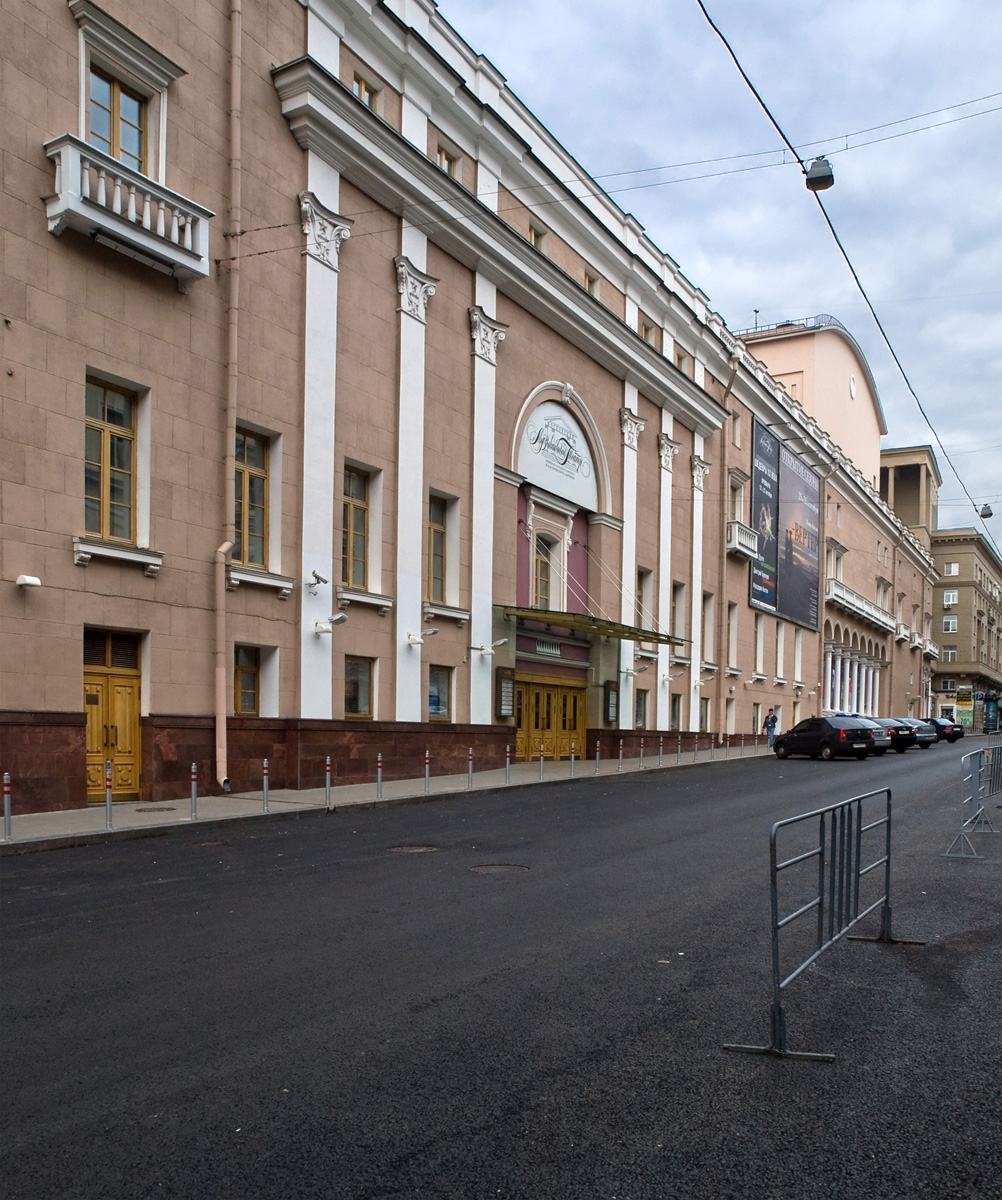
- Interactive map of Stanislavski and Nemirovich-Danchenko Theatre
- Address: 17 Bolshaya Dmitrovka Street; Moscow; Russia
- Coordinates: 55°45′53″N 37°36′38″E

Construction
- Opened: 1941

Website
- stanmus.ru/en/

The Stanislavski and Nemirovich-Danchenko Moscow Academic Music Theatre (Russian: Московский академический Музыкальный театр имени народных артистов К. С. Станиславского и Вл. И. Немировича-Данченко) is a music theatre in Moscow.

The Stanislavsky and Nemirovich-Danchenko Moscow Academic Music Theatre was founded in 1941 when two companies directed by the legendary reformers of 20th-century theatre—Konstantin Stanislavski and Vladimir Nemirovich-Danchenko—merged: the Stanislavsky Opera Theatre (established at the end of 1918 as an Opera Studio of the Bolshoi Theatre) and the Nemirovich-Danchenko Music Theatre (set up in 1919 as a Studio of the Moscow Art Theatre).

The ballet company entered the theatre as a part of Nemirovich-Danchenko's troupe. It was the former company of the Moscow Art Ballet, established in 1929 by Victorina Krieger, the ballerina of the Bolshoi Theatre. She was Artistic Director and one of the principal dancers of the Moscow Art Ballet. Soon after Stanislavsky's death, Nemirovich-Danchenko took charge of all the companies (Vsevolod Meyerhold invited by Stanislavsky to work for his theatre, was arrested in 1939, and no other stage director could prove equal to Nemirovich-Danchenko). Then the theatre was given its present name.

== Stanislavski's Opera Studio ==
In 1918 Stanislavski founded an Opera Studio under the auspices of the Bolshoi Theatre, though it later severed its connection with the theatre. Its successful production of Werther in 1923 was banned while the director was abroad. In 1924 it was renamed the "Stanislavski Opera Studio" and in 1926 it became the "Stanislavski Opera Studio-Theatre", when it moved into its own permanent base at the Dmitrovsky Theatre. In 1928 it became the Stanislavski Opera Theatre. Shortly before his death in 1938 Stanislavski invited Vsevolod Meyerhold to take over the direction of the company; Meyerhold led the theatre up to his own arrest in June 1939.

Conductors: include Mikhail Zhukov 1922–1932, 1935–1938, current (2011) is Felix Korobov.

== Nemirovich-Danchenko musical theatre ==
Nemirovich had participated in the Bolshoi's production of The Snow Maiden but soon left for independent work. Nemirovich leaned towards popular operetta and vaudeville. At the end of 1920 he started production of Lecocq's La fille de Madame Angot, causing an uproar of the "serious drama" core of Moscow Art Theatre company. The show premiered in May 1920, starring Valeria Barsova and guests singers from Poland and Bolshoi company, and became a sell-out hit. A number of successful shows followed until 1925, when the company left for a long tour of Europe and the United States. Nemirovich took up an American offer and stayed in Hollywood until September 1927; a substantial part of his company refused to return to Soviet Russia; the company itself disintegrated.

When Nemirovich returned to the USSR in 1926, he had to start from scratch. For years, his operetta studio did not have a permanent base and orchestra, borrowing both from Stanislavski's theatre in Bolshaya Dmitrovka Street. The company produced primarily musical comedy shows but also the "serious" opera—Traviata and Katerina Izmailova, both in 1934; Katerina Izmailova was banned in 1935 and resumed in 1962.

== War and merger ==
In June 1941 Nemirovich's company performed on a tour in Murmansk and nearby military bases. Immediately upon the outbreak of Operation Barbarossa it returned to Moscow; the shows resumed on 10 August. Stanislavski's company returned to Moscow from Yaroslavl. On 1 September 1941 the companies, reduced in number, were merged to become the "Moscow State Musical Theatre of Stanislavski and Nemirovich-Danchenko." Nemirovich was appointed its artistic director. Keen on overcoming the limitations of the opera genre, he defended the title of a musical theatre. In September 1941 part of the company was evacuated first to Nalchik, then to Tbilisi and finally Ashabad; Nemirovich with the core of his company stayed in Moscow, performing for the troops. His Moscow company was the only Moscow theatre performing in the disastrous October–November 1941.

Nemirovich, after a short evacuation to Tbilisi, returned to Moscow in September 1942; he died in April 1943. After his death the theatre was managed by Joseph Tumanishvili (stage direction) and Samuil Samosud (musical department). Over four years of the war the company, split in small groups, performed 770 shows for the front-line troops. Two of its staff were killed in action and one group of artists was taken prisoners of war.

== 1945–1999 ==
After the war the theatre, directed by Samosud (and later Dmitri Kitajenko and Lev Mikhailov), continued operation as a primarily classical opera house; it retained some successful vaudevilles produced in the 1930s, but their share was gradually reduced. In the 1960s to 1980s the theatre regularly collaborated with Komische Oper Berlin, inviting Walter Felsenstein and Dieter Mueller to produce musicals in Moscow.

In 1976 Pravda launched an unforgiving attack against the "revised" version of Tchaikovsky's The Queen of Spades. The show was salvaged through support of artistic circles.

In 1989 the theatre suffered its first disastrous fire. The main hall was not damaged, but the fire destroyed the props storage; 20 titles were cancelled for years. In December 1990 the company refused to perform in a strike action against the management. The city of Moscow shut down the theatre for two weeks; in January 1991 it reopened under the same management. In July 1991 the orchestra and the choir resigned with their conductors, taking some of the opera soloists with them, finally prompting a replacement of the management.

== 21st century ==
The company's repertoire since 2005 has included:

- Operas – including: Betrothal in a Monastery, a burlesque double-bill Cafe "Socrate" featuring Erik Satie's Socrate and Darius Milhaud's Le pauvre matelot, Bizet's Carmen, Così fan tutte, The Demon, Die Fledermaus, Eugene Onegin Vladimir Kobekin's comic opera Hamlet (Prince of Denmark) (Russian) Comedy) (2008), Il Barbiere di Siviglia, La Bohème, La forza del destino, La traviata, Les Contes d'Hoffmann, Lucia di Lammermoor, Madama Butterfly, May Night, Moscow, Cheryomushki, Pelléas et Mélisande, Pique Dame, The Tale of Tsar Saltan, Tosca and Werther.
- Ballet – Traditional Russian repertoire as well as experimental works.

In 2019 it was awarded the Fiddler on the Roof Award in the Theatre category.

== Ballet company ==
Repertoire

- Anna Karenina (choreography Christian Spuck)
- Don Quixote
- La Bayadère
- La Sylphide
- L'histoire de Manon
- Swan Lake
- The Nutcracker
- The Snow Maiden
- Ballets by George Balanchine, Paul Taylor, Jacques Garnier, Alexander Ekman, Dmitry Bryantsev, Marco Goecke, Ohad Naharin, Serge Lifar, Jiri Kylian, and William Forsythe
