= Svetlana Nemolyaeva =

Soviet and Russian actress

- Светлана Немоляева
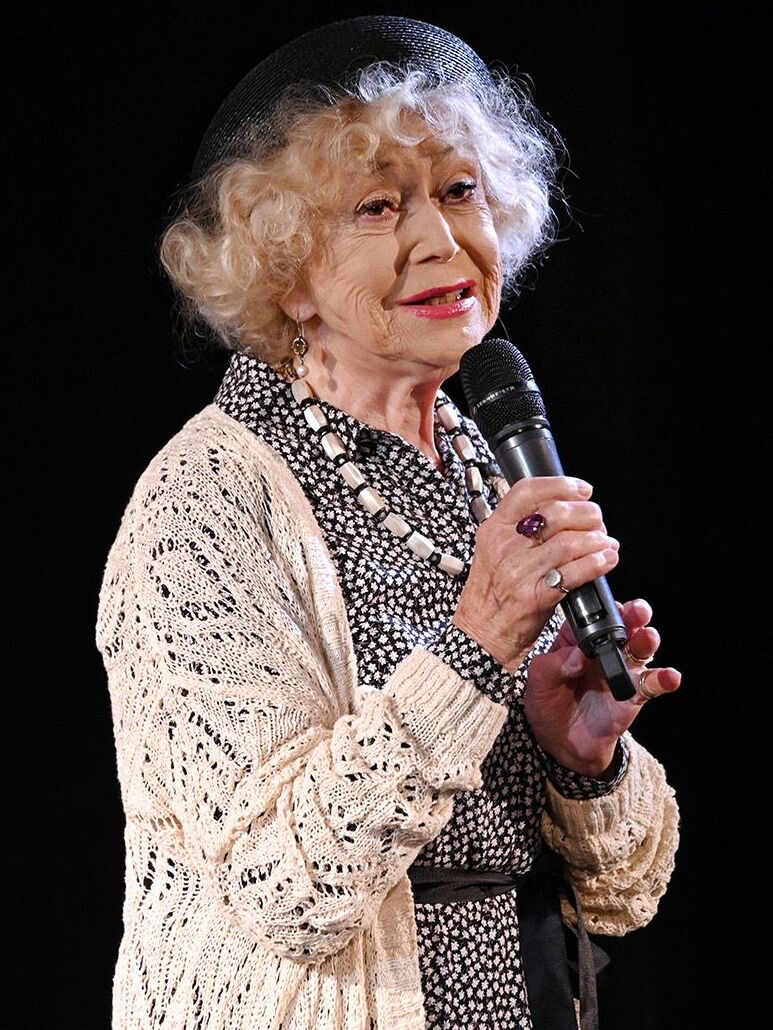
- Nemolyaeva in 2023
- Born: 18 April 1937 (age 89); Moscow, USSR
- Occupation: actress
- Years active: 1945 – present
- Awards: People's Artist of the RSFSR (1980)

Svetlana Vladimirovna Nemolyaeva (Russian: Светлана Владимировна Немоляева; born 18 April 1937) is a Soviet and Russian actress of film and theatre. She is the widow of Alexander Lazarev.

== Biography ==
Svetlana Nemolyaeva was born in Moscow in 1937. Her father Vladimir Viktorovich Nemolyaev (1902-1987) was a film director, her mother Valentina Lvovna Nemolyaeva (née Ladygina, 1907-1988), a sound engineer at the film studio. Among the family friends were renowned Soviet actors Lyudmila Tselikovskaya, Mikhail Zharov, Vsevolod Pudovkin, a star circus comic, Rumyantsev. Parents were often filming their little daughter in mass scenes; Nemolyaeva's first feature film was Konstantin Yudin's Twins (1945), starring Tselikovskaya and Zharov, where the 8-year-old played Svetochka.

In 1958, after graduating the Shchepkin's Theatre College, Nemolyaeva joined the Theatre on Malaya Bronnaya, then, after just one season, moved to the Mayakovsky Theatre where she remained for the rest of her life. One of her first successes there was the part of Ophelia in Shakespeare’s Hamlet, produced by the then theatre's director, Nikolai Okhlopkov. Later, as Andrey Goncharov came to become the head of the theatre, she created several outstanding characters, notably Blanche in Tennessee Williams's A Streetcar Named Desire and the Mayoress Anna Andreevna in Nikolai Gogol’s Revizor.

Svetlana Nemolyaeva's first success on screen came was the part of Olga Larina in Roman Tikhomirov's Evgeny Onegin (1958). She had to wait several years for another big part, in Konstantin Khudyakov's Such a Short Long Life (1975), co-starring Alexander Lazarev, fellow Mayakovsky Theatre actor, whom she married in 1960. Her real breakthrough came when Eldar Ryazanov invited her to play Olya Ryzhova in his highly successful intellectual comedy Office Romance. Later, he filmed her again, in The Garage. In 1980, Svetlana Nemolyaeva was awarded the prestigious title of the People's Artist of Russia. In the 1980s and 1990s Nemolyaeva continued to appear on screen regularly; critically acclaimed were her parts of Madam Zizi (Say a Word for a Poor Hussar), actress Nina Ossovskaya (The Intrusion), Irina in The Relatives (TV play) and Matilda (The Dame’s Visit). She was awarded (twice) Order For Merit to the Fatherland, 4th and 3rd class (2007, 2012).

== Awards ==
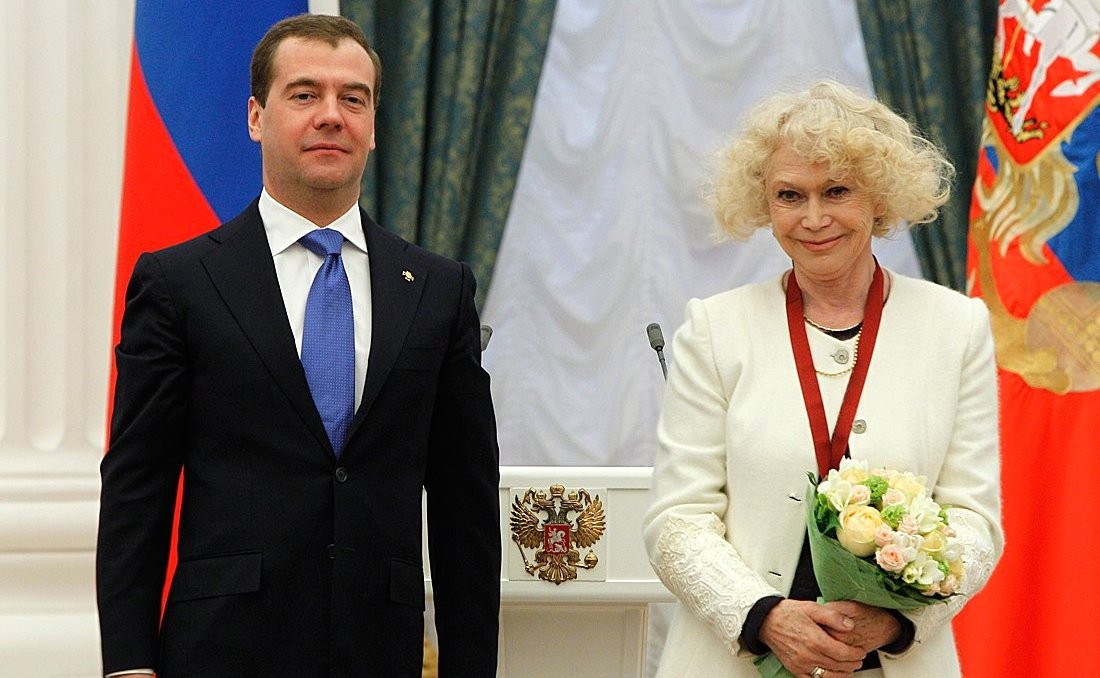
Dmitry Medvedev with Nemolyaeva on presentation of the Order "For Merit to the Fatherland" 3rd class, 3 May 2012

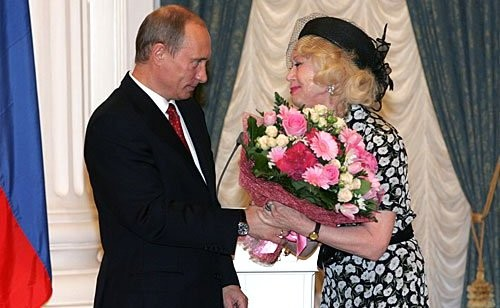
Vladimir Putin with Nemolyaeva on presentation of the order "For Merit to the Fatherland" 4th class, 22 May 2007

- 1980 — People's Artist of the RSFSR
- 1998 (February 3) — Order of Honour (Russian Federation) - for his contribution to the development of theatrical art
- 2007 (January 31) — Order For Merit to the Fatherland 4th class (Russia) - for her contribution to the development of the national theater, and many years of creative activity
- 2012 (April 5) — Order For Merit to the Fatherland 3rd class (Russia) - for her contribution to the development of domestic theatrical and cinematic art, many years of creative activity

== Filmography ==
- Twins (Bliznetsy, 1945, Svetochka)
- Karandash on Ice (Karandash na ldu, 1948, the Girl)
- Happy Flight (Schastlivy reis, 1949, the Girl)
- Evgeny Onegin (1958, Olga Larina)
- Brief Encounters (Korotkiye vstretchi, 1967, Lyolya, the hairdresser)
- The Circle (Krug, 1972, Lara Vasiltseva)
- An Hour Before Dawn (Za thas do rassveta, Olga Derzhavina)
- Waiting for a Miracle (V ozhidanii tchuda, 1975, Marja Shmagina)
- Such a Short Long Life (Takaya korotkaya dolgaya zhizn, 1975, Yelena Ignatyeva)
- The Daytime Train (Dnevnoy poezd, 1976, Tamara)
- Office Romance (Sluzhebny roman, 1977, Olga Ryzhova)
- The Portrait with Rain (Portret s dozhdyom, 1977, Viktoria Kulikova)
- The Reserve Airfield (Zapasnoy aerodrom, 1978, Arina)
- The Garage (Garazh, 1979, Guskov’s wife)
- The Month of Long Days (Mesyats dlinnykh dnei, 1979)
- Say a Word for the Poor Hussar (O bednom gusare zamolvite slovo, 1981, Madame Zizi)
- All Goes the Wrong Way (Vsyo naoborot, 1981, Yermakov’s mother)
- A Happy Sretch (Polosa vezenya, 1981)
- The Intrusion (Vtorzhenye, 1981, Nina Ossovskaya, the actress)
- 4-0 in Tanechka's Favour (Tchetyre-nol v polzu Tanechki, 1982, Izolda Vasilyevna)
- The Family Affair (Semeynoe delo, 1982, the wife)
- Quarantine (Karantin, 1983, the Grandmother)
- The Donkey's Hyde (Oslinaya shkura, 1982, the Queen Gorzhetta)
- The Mystery of the Blackbirds (Taina Tchornykh Drozdov, 1983, Dolly Smith)
- In the Light of the Day (Sred bela dnya, 1983, the Judge)
- And then Came Bumbo (I vot prishol Bumbo..., 1984, Nika)
- The Final Step (Posledny shag, 1984, Kartseva)
- The Leap (Pryzhok, 1985, Elena Shchukovich)
- Over the Main Street with Orchestra (Po glavnoi ulitse s orkestrom, 1986, Romanovskaya)
- Start Again (Nachni snatchala, 1986, Maria Nikolayevna)
- Investigation Started. The Slander (K rassledovaniyu pristupit, 1987, Nina Vashchenko)
- Offer You My Hand and Heart (Predlagayu ruku i serdtse, 1988, Rosa Alexandrovna)
- The Dame's Visit (Vizit damy, 1989, Mathilda)
- Village Stepantchikovo and its Inhabitants (Selo Stepantchikovo i yevo obitateli, 1989, Tatyana Ivanovna)
- Rock and Roll for Princesses (1990, the Queen)
- The Crime of Lord Arthur (Prestuplenye lorda Artura, 1991, Dutchess Paisley)
- Promised Heaven (Nebesa obetovannye, 1991, Aglaya Sviderskaya)
- Anna Karamazoff (1991, the Neighbour)
- Predators (Khishchniki, 1991, Avdonina)
- To Be in Love (Byt vlyublyonnym, 1992, Natalya Skvortsova)
- Seven Forty (Sem sorok, Ukraine, 1992, Nora Khorevna)
- Trifles of Life (Melochi zhizni, 1992—1997, Albina Sergeevna)
- The Provincial Benefice Show (Provintsyalny benefis, 1993, Smelskaya-Korinkina)
- Superman by Default or An Erotic Mutant (Superman ponevole ili ertocheski muzykant, 1993, Vera Sasilyevna)
- Shout Bitter! (Gorko!, 1998, Irina)
- The Bremen Musicians (Bremenskiye muzykanty, 2000, the Dog’s Mother)
- Happy New Happiness-2. Kiss in the Frost (S novym stchastyem-2. Potselui na moroze, 2001, Kuropatova)
- The Failing of Poirot (Neudacha Puaro, 2002, TV series, Mrs. Ackroyd)
- The Podmoskovye Elegy (Podmoskovnaya elegia, 2002, Tata)
- Yevlampia Romanova (2003, Viktoria Pavlovna)
- Sisters (Syostry, 2004, Galina Alexeevna)
- The Balzac Age or all Men are Bea... (Balzakovsky vozrast ili Vse muzhiki svo..., 2004, Svetlana Modestovna)
- The Commercial Break (Reklamnaya pauza, 2006, Inna Ivanovna)
- The Leningrad Man (Leningradets, 2006, Raisa Ivanovna)
- The Falling Leaves Blues (Blyuz opadayushchikh listjev, 2006, Anastasia Leonidovna)
- Rails of Happiness (Relsy stchastya, 2006, Vera’s mother)
- When You Least Expect Her (Kogda eiyo sovsem ne zhdyosh, 2007, Tatyana)
- The Actress (Artistka, 2007, Tamara Arkadyevna, the theatre actress)
- The Ideal Wife (Idealhnaya zhena, 2007, Oleg’s mother)
- The Boss at Home (Pervy doma, 2007, Guskov’s wife)
- Thirteen Months (Trinadtsat mesyatsev, 2008, Ukraine, Raisa Nikitichna)
- The Autumn Leaves (Osennye tsvety, 2009, Leda Nezhina)
- The Father's Girls (Papiny dotchki, 2009, Alexander’s wife)
- Zoya (2009, Sorokin’s mother)
- Flowers from Liza (Tsvety ot Lizy, 2010, Klavdiya alexandrovna)
- A House without a Number (Dom bez adresa, 2010, Anna’s mother)
- Kiss through a Wall (Potseluy skvoz stenu, 2011, Alisa’s grenadmother)
- The Dove (Golubka, 2011, Anna Valentinovna)
- Comrade Policemen (Tovarishchi politseyskye, 2011, Liliya Melnikova)

== Literature ==
- Кино: Энциклопедический словарь. М., 1987. (in Russian) — P.296.
- Дубровский В. Серебряный шнур: А. Лазарев, С. Немоляева, А. Лазарев-младший. М., 2001. (in Russian)
