= Oksana Mysina =

Russian actress

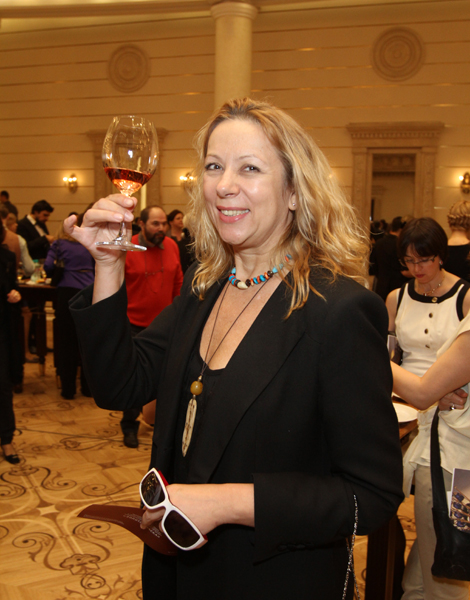
Oksana Mysina in 2012

Oksana Anatolyevna Mysina (Russian: Окса́на Анато́льевна Мы́сина) (born 15 March 1961, Yenakiieve, Donetsk Oblast, Ukraine, USSR) is an actor, director and musician. She has been described by The New York Times theatre critic Margo Jefferson as one of Russia's greatest actors. She is the founder, lead singer, violinist, and lyricist for the rock band Oxy Rocks.

== Personal life ==
Oksana Mysina was born and lived in the Donbas region of Ukraine for the first eight years of her life. Her father Anatoly Vladimirovich Mysin, later to be a mining engineer, and her mother Lidia Grigoryevna Mysina (Bratus), subsequently a seismologist, grew up and were married in the Ukrainian city of Dnepropetrovsk (now Dnipro). Oksana credits both parents with giving her the necessary actor's sensibilities: "My irrepressible temperament is from my mother. My father... was a very emotional person." Oksana's sister Marina Yakut (Mysina), three years her elder, was a young talent on the violin and a teacher told the girls' parents that Marina needed to study in Moscow. As Mysina told the audience during a performance in Yekaterinburg in April 2019, the teacher "told my parents: 'Immediately! Immediately to Moscow! I've never had such a talent.' And they took me along too." The family moved to Moscow in 1969 where Oksana and Marina both studied violin and viola at the Gnesin School of Music. "I was admitted to Gnesinka in the hopes that I would be Marina No. 2," Oksana said in 2004. But Oksana had dreamed of acting since childhood, and, while still studying at the Gnesin School, she joined a well-known youth theater: "While still studying [violin], I worked with Vyacheslav Spesivtsev at the then-super popular Krasnaya Presnya Youth Theater." She subsequently studied professionally at the Shchepkin Institute of the Maly Theater under the famed Mikhail Tsaryov, who had acted for Vsevolod Meyerhold in the 1930s. She joined her first professional company, the Spartacus Square Theater-studio in 1986.

Oksana married American writer and translator John Freedman in 1989. They lived in Moscow until November 2018 when they relocated to Greece.

== Stage ==
Mysina was a member of the Spartacus Square Theater-studio (known as Theater Moderne since 1995) from 1986 to 1994. During this tenure she achieved her first international exposure, performing the title role in Lyudmila Razumovskaya's play Dear Yelena Sergeevna on tours to the BITEF festival in Serbia in 1989, and Chicago and Los Angeles in 1990. She began working independently at various Moscow theaters, starting at the Novy Drama Theater, where she performed from 1993 to 2000, and the Theater of Young Spectators (MTYuZ), where she performed from 1994 to 2020.

Mysina's starring role at MTYuZ as Katerina Ivanovna in Kama Ginkas's 1994 Moscow production of his son Daniil Gink's play K. I. from Crime, a 90-minute monologue adapted from Fyodor Dostoyevsky's Crime and Punishment was acclaimed as the best production of the Moscow season. "Critics widely agreed [that she] rose to the creative heights demanded by Dostoevsky." In tours around the world, she took the role to the Grotowski Center in Wroclaw, Poland, in 1995, the Avignon Festival, France, in 1997, the Belgrade International Theater Festival (BITEF) in Belgrade, Yugoslavia, in 2000, the Midwinter Night's Festival in Tallinn, Estonia, 2000, the Mikhail Tumanishvili International Arts Festival in Tbilisi, Georgia, in 2002, Bard SummerScape in Annandale-on-Hudson, New York in 2003 the Foundry Theater on Off-Broadway in New York City in 2005, on a three-city tour of Brazil in 2006, and elsewhere.

Aside from her work with Ginkas, Mysina has acted for many top theater directors, including Boris Lvov-Anokhin (Novy Drama Theater, 1993–2001), Vladimir Mirzoyev (Stanislavsky Drama Theater, 1997), Roman Kozak (Moscow Art Theater and Pushkin Drama Theater, 1997–2000), Oleg Menshikov (814 Theater Association, 2000–01), Dmitry Krymov (School of Dramatic Art, 2010–2018), as well as in the professional debut of Eugenia Berkovich (Kirill Serebrennikov's Seventh Studio at Winzavod, 2011). She was the first Russian-language performer of the Narrator in the Russian premiere of Valère Novarina's contemporary avant-garde classic The Imaginary Operetta at the School of Dramatic Art (2010). She founded her own theater, the Oksana Mysina Theatrical Brotherhood (2001-2010), directing and acting in two plays by Viktor Korkiya, Don Quixote and Sancho Panza on the Island of Taganrog, and Ariston, based on the myth of Oedipus. She was the first performer in roles of plays by numerous contemporary playwrights, including Lyudmila Razumovskaya, Yevgeny Kozlovsky, Alexei Kazantsev, Maksym Kurochkin, Korkiya, Alexander Chugunov, Vadim Levanov, Klim (pseudonym of Vladimir Klimenko), and Kira Malinina.

== Television ==
For her performance in Yelena Tsyplakova's 23-part miniseries Family Secrets (2001), Mysina received a Spolokhi award for the best actress. Her performance in "The Other Mask" episode of the original Kamenskaya TV mini-series is recognized as a small masterpiece. In Oleg Babitsky and Yury Goldin's television movie of Mikhail Bulgakov's Theatrical Novel (2003), she offered an eccentric interpretation of Polixena. Her performance as Elzbieta in Alexei Zernov's ironic TV mini-series All or Nothing, based on Joanna Chmielewska's Wszystko czerwona (All Red), was first aired in 2004. Mysina performed the lead in Arkady Sirenko's made-for TV movie Wilting-Failing, based on stories by Vasily Shukshin (2004). She performed in Andrei Eshpai, Jr.'s TV mini-series of Anatoly Rybakov's novel The Children of the Arbat (2004) and in Yury Kara's Star of the Age (2005) in which she played the legendary Russian actress Serafima Birman.

== Film ==
For her performance in Vadim Abdrashitov's A Play for a Passenger (1995) Mysina received a Golden Ram award for best debut. Her performance as the Empress Marya Fyodorovna in Vitaly Melnikov's Poor Poor Paul (2003), a cinematic biography about Russian Tsar Pavel I, has been recognized for excellence on several fronts. It brought her awards at the 14th annual Vera Kholodnaya Women of Film festival, the Vivat, Russian Cinema festival, and the Artek International Children's Film Festival, all in 2004. For this role, she was nominated for a Nika Award (considered the Russian Oscar) as the Best Supporting Actress. She played the tragicomic role Hans Christian Andersen's mother Anna-Maria in Eldar Ryazanov's Andersen (2007). In 2012, she won the Special President's Prize at the 10th annual Amur Autumn Russian Film and Theater Festival in Blagoveshchensk, Russia, for her performance of the Poetess in Vitaly Melnikov's film The Admirer.

After relocating to Greece, Mysina actively began directing experimental short and feature films for her own Free Flight Films production company. Her eleven releases as of February 2025 have enjoyed success at international film festivals (see Film Awards and Nominations below).

== Oksana Mysina and Oxy Rocks ==
Mysina fronted the rock band Oksana Mysina and Oxy Rocks from 2003 until 2018. Oksana was the band's vocalist, electric violinist and lyricist. The music for most of their songs was written by bassist Dmitry Yershov or lead guitarist Sergei Shchetinin. Oxy Rock's Russian-language cover of Bob Dylan's "Things Have Changed" has been played by legendary Philadelphia DJ Michael Tearson several times on his World Wide Dylan in Translations shows, most recently in 2022, where, as the show ended, he commented, "I love how Oksana did that!" (No. 36/248 on radiothatdoesn'tsuck.com). In 2012 Ainars Virga, the leader of famed Latvian band Līvi, joined Oxy Rocks for a series of concerts in Moscow. Mysina has incorporated several of her band's songs into her films, including the song "Ivan Petrovich" in Ivan Petrovich, "World on Edge," "The Last Drop" and others in Red, Blue, and Asya, and "Blues-Rock Mood" in Voices of the New Belarus. Oksana created her own music video of "Ivan Petrovich" in December 2023.

== Political views and activity ==
Oksana Mysina has repeatedly taken part in mass protests, including the public demonstrations titled "For Fair Elections", "March Against Scoundrels" and "March of Peace". She was the emcee of the "March of Truth" rally in 2014 and of Alexei Navalny's "For the Change of Power" rally in 2015. She advocated the release of the defendants in the Bolotnaya case and members of the Pussy Riot group. She participated in the work of the "Congress of Intelligentsia Against the War, Russia's Self-Isolation and the Restoration of Totalitarianism." She supported Navalny in Moscow's mayoral election in 2013, and has frequently spoken out against the persecution of Russian historian Yury A. Dmitriev. In December 2021 she organized and hosted an online marathon of prominent public figures speaking in defense of Dmitriev.

In 2011, the actress signed the "Open Letter to Cultural Figures," opposing the presidential candidacy of Vladimir Putin. In March 2014, along with a number of other figures in the fields of science and culture, she expressed her opposition to Russia's annexation of Crimea. In May of the same year, together with other participants in a discussion platform titled "Round Table on 12 December", she issued a "Statement on the situation in the country, the responsibility of civil society and political elites", which declared that Russia was in "a transition to a fascist-type totalitarian regime is taking place".

Five of Mysina's films have been expressions of her political views: Insulted. Belarus (2020), based on a play by Andrei Kureichik, exposed the horrors of the failed Minsk Revolution in 2020 (2020-2021 Belarusian protests); Voices of the New Belarus (2021), based on a verbatim play by Andrei Kureichik about imprisoned Belarusian protesters, features a performance by Russian politician Ilya Yashin who, himself, was sentenced to eight years in prison in December 2022; Escape (2022), a true-life film short about a refugee from the Russian invasion of Ukraine; Love is Stronger than Fear (2022), a short version of Voices of the New Belarus; and Cherry Orchard. War (2023), a short mixing snippets of Anton Chekhov's writings with documentary interviews that reveal the struggles of Russian and Belarusian theater and film artists who have opposed Russia's war against Ukraine.

== Credits ==
=== Theater, acting ===
1. 1979 — I Came to Give you Freedom by Vasily Shukshin, dir. by Vyacheslav Spesivtsev, Moscow Krasnaya Presnya Youth Theater. Hysterical Woman, violinist

2. 1980 — Sadko, a Russian legend, dir. by Vyacheslav Spesivtsev, Moscow Krasnaya Presnya Youth Theater. The Phoenix

3. 1980 — Tom Sawyer after Mark Twain, a musical dir. by Vyacheslav Spesivtsev, Moscow Krasnaya Presnya Youth Theater. Aunt Polly

4. 1984 — Thus Will it Be by Konstantin Simonov, dir. by Rimma Solntseva, Shchepkin Theater Institute, Moscow. Major Grech

5. 1984 — Talents and Admirers by Alexander Ostrovsky, dir. by Natalya Petrova, Shchepkin Theater Institute, Moscow. Domna Panteleevna

6. 1985 — Oliver Twist! after Charles Dickens, a musical by Lionel Bart, dir. by Natalya Petrova, Shchepkin Theater Institute, Moscow. Nancy

7. 1985 — The House by Fyodor Abramov, dir. by Tatyana Yerokhina, Shchepkin Theater Institute, Moscow. Yevdokia the Martyr

8. 1985 — The Rainmaker by N. Richard Nash, dir. by Rimma Solntseva, Shchepkin Theater Institute, Moscow. Lizzie

9. 1987 — Dear Yelena Sergeyevna by Lyudmila Razumovskaya, dir. by Svetlana Vragova, Moscow Spartacus Square Theater-studio. Yelena Sergeyevna

10. 1988 — Personals! a devised performance, dir. by Svetlana Vragova, Moscow Spartacus Square Theater-studio. Various

11. 1991 — Video: Box: Cell after Yevgeny Kozlovsky, dir. by Svetlana Vragova, Moscow Spartacus Square Theater-studio. Vera

12. 1992 — Rasplyuyev's Joyous Days after Alexander Sukhovo-Kobylin, dir. by Svetlana Vragova, Moscow Spartacus Square Theater-studio. Brandakhlystova

13. 1993 — The Aspern Papers by Michael Redgrave (adapted from the Henry James story), dir. by Boris Lvov-Anokhin, Moscow New Drama Theater. Tina

14. 1994 — K.I. from "Crime" by Daniil Gink (adapted from Fyodor Dostoevsky's Crime and Punishment), dir. by Kama Ginkas, Moscow Young Spectator Theater. Katerina Ivanovna (K.I.)

15. 1995 — A Heroic Comedy, or the Whims of Madame de Staël by Ferdinand Bruckner, dir. by Boris Lvov-Anokhin, Moscow New Drama Theatre. Germaine de Staël

16. 1996 — The Queen's Revenge, or, the Novellas of Margaret of Navarre by Eugène Scribe and Ernest Legouvé, dir. by Boris Lvov-Anokhin, Moscow New Drama Theatre. Margaret of Navarre

17. 1997 — That, This Other World by Alexei Kazantsev, dir. by Vladimir Mirzoev, Moscow Stanislavsky Drama Theater.

18. 1997 (joined cast) — Teibele and her Demon by Eve Friedman and Isaac Bashevis Singer, dir. by Vyacheslav Dolgachyov, Chekhov Moscow Art Theater. Teibele

19. 1999 — Moscow Stories of Love and Marriage by Alexander Ostrovsky, dir. by Boris Lvov-Anokhin, Moscow New Drama Theatre. Serafima Karpovna

20. 1999 — The Main Thing by Nikolai Evreinov, dir. by Roman Kozak, Chekhov Moscow Art Theater. Barefoot Dancer

21. 2000 — Kitchen by Maksym Kurochkin, dir. by Oleg Menshikov, 814 Theatrical Association. Kriemhilde/Washerwoman

22. 2001 — Quixote and Sancho by Viktor Korkiya, dir. by Oksana Mysina, Oksana Mysina Theatrical Brotherhood. Sancho Panza

23. 2002 — The Black Prince by Iris Murdoch, dir. by Roman Kozak, Moscow Pushkin Drama Theatre. Rachel Baffin

24. 2003 — Shocked Tatyana by Lasha Bugadze, first reading of this play in Moscow, New Drama Festival, Moscow Art Theater. Tatyana

25. 2005 (joined cast) – Ariston by Viktor Korkiya, dir. by Oksana Mysina, Oksana Mysina Theatrical Brotherhood. Jocasta

26. 2005 — The King of Sins and Queen of Fears after Witold Gombrowicz, dir. by Yury Urnov, Theater of Nations. Margaret, the Queen of Fears

27. 2006 — Libido by Alexander Chugunov, dir. by Alexander Ogaryov, Ecumene Theater House. Inna

28. 2008 — Dead Man's Cell Phone by Sarah Ruhl, dir. by Yury Urnov, commercial production. Mrs. Harriet Gottlieb

29. 2010 — Tararabumbia a devised performance based on Chekhovian themes, dir. by Dmitry Krymov, School of Dramatic Art. Ranevskaya and other Chekhov heroines

30. 2010 — The Firebird, dir. by Stacy Klein, Double Edge Theatre, USA. Various.

31. 2010 — The Bear by Anton Chekhov, a puppet performance dir. by Vladimir Biryukov, Kostroma Puppet Theater KultProekt, Moscow. Voice of Yelena Ivanovna Popova

32. 2010 — The Imaginary Operetta by Valère Novarina, dir. by Christophe Feutrier, School of Dramatic Art. Narrator

33. 2011 (joined cast) — The Auction based on Chekhovian themes, School of Dramatic Art, dir. by Dmitry Krymov. Ranevskaya and other Chekhovian heroines

34. 2011 — Gerontophobia by Vadim Levanov, dir. by Evgenia Berkovich, Kirill Serebrennikov's Seventh Studio at Winzavod. The Actress

35. 2011 — Letters from Prisoners, a documentary reading dir. by Georg Genoux, dramaturged by Yekaterina Bondarenko, at Memorial Society, Moscow. Various

36. 2011 — Dancing, Not Dead by John Freedman, dir. by Georg Genoux, Liubimovka/Teatr.doc & Sakharov Center, Moscow. Daughter

37. 2011 — The Theater of Medea by Klim, dir. by Vladimir Berzin, School of Dramatic Art. Medea

38. 2011/2013 — Brighton Beach by Peca Ştefan, dir. by Doug Howe, in the Long Distance Affair project produced online worldwide by The Internationalists (2011) and PopUp Theatrics (2013). Oksana

39. 2013 — Someone Else by Pyotr Gladilin, dir. by Sergei Kokovkin, Stage Island international theater forum, Hiiumaa Island, Estonia. She

40. 2013 — October 1993. Personal Chronicles a documentary project by Alexei Kryzhevsky, dir. by Georg Genoux, dramaturged by Nana Grinshtein, at Memorial Society, Moscow. Various

41. 2013 — I Demand the Floor by Kira Malinina (based on a screenplay by Gleb Panfilov), dir. by Gleb Cherepanov, Kirill Serebrennikov's Creative Laboratory at the Russian Theater Union. Yelizaveta Uvarova

42. 2013/2014 — Death and the Maiden by Elfriede Jelinek, dir. by Yury Muravitsky, Platforma, Moscow.

43. 2014 — The Green Cheeks of April by Mikhail Ugarov, a staged reading dir. by Ugarov, Boyarskie Palaty, Moscow. Nadezhda Krupskaya

44. 2014 — Putin's Mother by Lasha Bugadze, a reading dir. by Alexander Vartanov for the Reboot Festival, Teatr.doc. Putin's Mother

45. 2015 — Stalin by Rodion Beletsky, a reading dir. by Nastya Patlay, Teatr.doc. Joseph Stalin

46. 2015 — Russian Blues. Hunting for Mushrooms a devised performance, dir. by Dmitry Krymov, School of Dramatic Art. The Neighbor

47. 2017 — The Cherry Orchard by Anton Chekhov, dir. by Alexander Vlasov, Anton Chekhov Museum, Moscow. Lyubov Ranevskaya

48. 2018 — Αλέ! Αλέ! Αλέ! (Hey! Hey! Hey!) written and dir. by Ketty Koraka, Odeon Theater, Chania, Crete (Greece). Various

49. 2019 — Παραμύθια τούμπανα! (Fairytale Drums!) written and dir. by Ketty Koraka, Odeon Theater, Chania, Crete (Greece). Various

50. 2021 — Yes I Will Yes! (Molly's monologue from James Joyce's Ulysses), dir. by Nikolai Berman, Andrei Voznesensky Center, Moscow. Live stream on YouTube. Molly Bloom

=== Theater, directing ===
1. 2001 — Quixote and Sancho by Viktor Korkiya, Oksana Mysina Theatrical Brotherhood.

2. 2003 — A Family Evening by Andrei Kureichik, OPEN FORMAT festival, Minsk, Belarus.

3. 2004 — Ariston by Viktor Korkiya, Oksana Mysina Theatrical Brotherhood.

4. 2013 — The Bloody Lady Daria Saltykova by Vadim Levanov, a staged reading at Open Story Project at the Russian Theater Union, Moscow.

=== Theater awards and nominations ===
1. 1995 — Moskovsky Komsomolets Prize for K.I. from 'Crime'

2. 1996 — Nominated for a Golden Mask award for Best Actress, Golden Mask Festival, Moscow, for performance of K.I. in K.I. from 'Crime'

3. 2000 — Special Prize for performance in K.I. from 'Crime' at the Belgrade International Theater Festival (BITEF).

4. 2000 — Innokenty Smoktunovsky Prize for her performance of Serafima Karpovna in the play Moscow Stories of Love and Marriage.

5. 2011 — Best One-Actor Show at the Christmas Parade Festival (St. Petersburg) for her performance of Medea in Theater of Medea.

=== Film and television, acting ===
1. 1987 – Time to Fly, dir. by Alexei Sakharov – Woman on duty

2. 1987 – Habitat, dir. by Lev Tsutsulkovsky – Oksana, violinist

3. 1988 – Miss Millionairess, dir. by Alexander Rogozhkin – Galya

4. 1988 – The Birthday (after the play Dear Yelena Sergeyevna), dir. by Svetlana Vragova and Andrei Nikishin – Yelena Sergeyevna

5. 1991 – $1,000 One-way Ticket, dir. by Alexander Surin – Natalya's friend

6. 1991 – The Leg, dir. by Nikita Tyagunov – Anzhelika

7. 1992 – The Money Changers, dir. by Georgy Shengeliya – Elena Grakina [All sources list Oksana's participation in this film, and so it is included here, although her scenes were left on the cutting floor]

8. 1993 – Silhouette in the Opposite Window, dir. by Rein Liblik – Nyuka

9. 1995 – A Play for a Passenger, dir. by Vadim Abdrashitov – Inna, Oleg's lodger

10. 2000 – Kamenskaya 1 (film No. 7 "Another's Mask"), dir. by Yury Moroz – Larisa Isichenko

11. 2001 – Family Secrets (23 series), dir. by Yelena Tsyplakova – Tatyana Yermakova

12. 2001 – Private Eyes, dir. by Vladimir Krasnopolsky and Valery Uskov – Oksana, wife of Yegor Nemigailo

13. 2002 – Wilting-Failing (film No. 6 in the Shukshin's Stories series), dir. Arkady Sirenko – Nina

14. 2002 – Theatrical Novel, dir. by Oleg Babitsky and Yury Goldin – Poliksena Vasilievna Toropetskaya

15. 2003 – Poor, Poor Pavel, dir. by Vitaly Melnikov – Maria Fyodorovna, Empress

16. 2003 – All or Nothing (16 series), dir. by Alexei Zernov – Elzbieta Krzyzanowska

17. 2004 – Children of the Arbat, dir. by Andrei Eshpai, Jr. – Zvyaguro

18. 2005 – Star of the Age, dir. by Yury Kara – Serafima Birman, Soviet actress

19. 2006 – Andersen. Life without Love, dir. by Eldar Ryazanov – Anna Maria, mother of Hans Christian Andersen

20. 2007 – The Journey, dir. by Vladimir Kharchenko-Kulikovsky – Anya

21. 2007 – Bloody Mary, dir. by Nonna Agadzhanova – Albina

22. 2007 – The 'Kill the Enemy' Agit-Brigade! dir. by Vitaly Melnikov – Serafima Ivanovna, pioneer leader

23. 2008 – The Big Waltz (an unfinished film by Vladimir Menshov)

24. 2008 – Lessons in Seduction, dir. by Alexei Lisovets – Alla

25. 2009 – Bravo, Laurencia! dir. by Nadezhda Ptushkina – Elya

26. 2010 – Guardians of the Internet, dir. by Dmitry Matov – Lidia Konstantinovna, business woman

27. 2012 – The Admirer, dir. by Vitaly Melnikov – The Poetess

28. 2013 – Past and Gone (documentary), dir. by Mikhail Ugarov – Yelena Mizulina

29. 2014 – Two Fathers and Two Sons 2 (episode No. 30), dir. by Radda Novikova – Antonina Vsevolodovna Makhnach, psychologist

30. 2014 – Tatiana's Night, dir. by Viktor Buturlin – Tamara, first wife of Alexander Ivanovich Golubei

31. 2014 – The Wonderworker, dir. by Dmitry Konstantinov – Unfortunate woman

32. 2017 – Listen! An Evening with Oksana Mysina at the Moscow International House of Music – reading poems by Alexander Timofeevsky, Viktor Korkiya, Shakespeare, Vladimir Mayakovsky, Nikolai Erdman, Vladimir Mass, etc.

33. 2018 – Shuttle Traders-2, dir. by Sergei Krasnov and Yulia Krasnova — Alla Ivanovna

34. 2018 — The Bonus, dir. by Valerya Gai Germanika — Gashik's mother

35. 2019 — The Roller Coaster, dir. by Aleko Tsabadze — Valentina Stepanovna, psychiatrist

36. 2025 — Molly, dir. by and starring Oksana Mysina — Molly

=== Film and television, miscellaneous performances ===
1. 2006 – Erdman and Stepanova: a Double Portrait in the Interior of an Era (documentary), dir. by Galina Yevtushenko – voice of Angelina Stepanova

2. 2006 – The Tulse Luper Suitcases. Russian version, dir. Peter Greenaway – dubbed voice for character Mrs. Haps-Mills

3. 2010 – Model for a Genius (documentary about Lydia Delektorskaya, muse to Henri Matisse), dir. by Olesya Fokina – voice of Lydia Delektorskaya

4. 2012 – I Long Have Walked a Straight Line (documentary about Irina Antonova, art historian and director of the Pushkin State Museum of Fine Arts), dir. by Olesya Fokina – voice of Irina Antonova

5. 2014 – Whisper. The Silver Age (a short film dedicated to figures of the Silver Age and the period of Young Symbolism), dir. by Konstantin Olonovsky) – poetry recitals

6. 2017 – Just a Handful of Ashes in my Hand (documentary about Russian poet Marina Tsvetaeva), dir. by Olesya Fokina – poetry recitals

=== Film awards and nominations for acting ===
1. 1995 – Golden Ram award in the "Hope" category at the Kinotavr film festival for her role as Inna in A Play for a Passenger.

2. 2001 – SPOLOKHI (Flash) award at the III TV Feature-Film Festival in Arkhangelsk for her role as Tatyana Yermakova in Family Secrets.

3. 2004 – I Remember that Wonderful Moment prize at the Vera Kholodnaya Women of Cinema Festival for her performance of Empress Maria Fyodorovna in Poor, Poor Pavel.

4. 2004 – Best Female Role at the Vivat Cinema of Russia! festival in St. Petersburg for her performance of Empress Maria Fyodorovna in Poor, Poor Pavel.

5. 2004 – Best Actress at the Artek XII International Children's Film Festival for her performance of Empress Maria Fyodorovna in Poor, Poor Pavel.

6. 2004 – Nomination for the Nika Award in the Best Supporting Actress category for her performance of Empress Maria Fyodorovna in Poor, Poor Pavel.

7. 2012 – Special President's Prize at 10th annual Amur Autumn Russian Film and Theater Festival in Blagoveshchensk, Russia, for her performance of the Poetess in The Admirer.

8. 2025 - Mokkho International Film Festival in India awards Oksana Mysina a Best Actress Critics Choice Award for her performance in Molly.

9. 2025 - San Francisco Arthouse Short Festival names Oksana Mysina Best Actress for her performance in Molly.

10. 2025 - Hollywood International Golden Age Festival names Oksana Mysina Best Actress for her performance in Molly.

=== Film, directing ===
1. 2020 – Insulted. Belarus, screenplay by Andrei Kureichik, full-length film. Free Flight Films.

2. 2021 – Red, Blue and Asya, based on O. Henry's "The Purple Dress," short film. Free Flight Films.

3. 2021 – Ivan Petrovich, based on monologues from Nikolai Erdman's play The Suicide, short film. Free Flight Films.

4. 2021 – Voices of the New Belarus, screenplay by Andrei Kureichik, full-length film. Free Flight Films.

5. 2022 – Escape, a real-life short about a family fleeing to Europe after the Russian invasion of Ukraine. Free Flight Films.

6. 2022 – Love is Stronger than Fear, a short version of Voices of the New Belarus, scripted by Andrei Kureichik. Free Flight Films.

7. 2023 — Cherry Orchard. War, a film short based on Chekhovian themes and improvized actors' monologues. Free Flight Films.

8. 2023 — "Ivan Petrovich," a music video drawn from the 2021 film of the same name. Free Flight Films.

9. 2025 — Molly, a film short based on "Molly Bloom's Soliloquy" from James Joyce's Ulysses. Free Flight Films.

10. 2025 - How to Survive Autumn, a hybrid film short about writer and artist Ksenia Smith who, thanks to cerebral palsy, has just the use of two fingers. Free Flight Films.

11. 2025 - A Woman and her Angels, a full-length feature. Free Flight Films.

=== Film awards and nominations for directing ===
1. 2021 – Stockholm City Film Festival selects Ivan Petrovich as a Semi-finalist.

2. 2021 – London Director Awards selects Insulted. Belarus as a Finalist.

3. 2021 – Best Female Actress Award selects Marina Kangelary as a Finalist for her performance in Red, Blue, and Asya.

4. 2021 – Boden International Film Festival selects Insulted. Belarus as a Semi-finalist.

5. 2021 – New York Cinematography Awards selects Red, Blue, and Asya as a Semi-finalist.

6. 2021 – Prague International Film Awards selects Red, Blue, and Asya as a Finalist.

7. 2021 – Best Shorts Competition (San Diego) bestows an Award of Recognition on Red, Blue, and Asya.

8-9. 2021 – Art Film Awards (Skopje) bestows an Honorable Mention (2nd Place) on Red, Blue, and Asya and Best Experimental Film on Insulted. Belarus .

10. 2021 – Blow-Up Arthouse Film Fest (Chicago) selects Red, Blue, and Asya as a Semi-finalist.

12. 2022 – Symbiotic Film Festival (Kyiv) selects Red, Blue, and Asya as a Nominee.

13-14. 2022 – Iconic Images Film Festival (Vilnius) selects Red, Blue, and Asya as winner in two categories: Best Female Director (Oksana Mysina), Best Zero Budget Film.

15-16. 2023 – Atlantis International Internet Short Film Festival (New York) bestows a Grand Prix award on Love is Stronger than Fear in the Cinema For Human Rights category, and a Grand Prix award on Escape in the Cinema Against War category.

17. 2023 – New York Istanbul Short Film Festival named Escape a Finalist.

18-19. 2023 – Flowers Against Bullets festival (Vienna) awards its top prize, the Red Cross award, to Escape, and awards Best Music Score (composer Sergei Kuchmenko) to Love is Stronger than Fear.

20-22. 2023 – Festival de Indie (Chennai, Tamil Nadu, India) declares Escape winners in three categories: Best Real-life Documentary Film, Best Original Score (Sergei Kuchmenko), Critics Award: Documentary Filmmaker to Oksana Mysina for Escape.

23-24. 2023 – Your Way International Film Festival (Valletta, Malta) awards Red, Blue and Asya with two prizes: Best No-Dialogue Film, Best Young Actress (Asya Zueva).

25. 2023 – Silver Mask Live Festival (Los Angeles) names Oksana Mysina Best Director for Red, Blue and Asya.

26-27. 2023 – Goldspire International Film Festival (Paris) names Oksana Mysina Best Director for her short film Red, Blue and Asya and names Escape Best Emotional Film.

28. 2023 – Gangtok International Film Festival (India) names Ivan Petrovich Best Comedy Short.

29-31. 2023 – Mayavaram International Film Festival (India) names Voices of the New Belarus Best International Feature Film, awards Escape a Special Jury Award in the Best Documentary Short Film category, and awards Red, Blue and Asya a Special Jury Award in the Best International Short Film category.

32-39. 2023 – Travancore International Film Awards (Kerala, India) gives four awards to Ivan Petrovich: Best Actor (Alexander Kochubei), Best Adaptation Screenplay for (Oksana Mysina & Alexander Kochubei), Best Short Film Adaptation, Best Short Filmmaker (Oksana Mysina); and gives five awards to Voices of the New Belarus: Best Regional Documentary Film, Best Experimental Documentary Film, Best Female Documentary Filmmaker (Oksana Mysina), Best Documentary Film Composer (Sergei Kuchmenko), Best Documentary Film Editor (Oksana Mysina).

40. 2023 – Independent Film Awards International Film Festival (Leeds, UK) names Escape a Finalist in the Best Indie Short Film category.

41-42. 2023 – Experimental Awards, London IFF names both Escape and Voices of the New Belarus Award Winners.

43-44. 2023 – NewsFest (true stories), Santa Monica, CA, awards three prizes to Escape: Most Impactful Film, Best International Trailer, Best International Film Over 15 Minutes.

45-51. 2023 – Himalaya International Film Festival gives seven awards to Red, Blue and Asya: Best International Short Film, Best Director, Best Actor in a short film (Alexei Zuev), Best Supporting Actress in a short film (Asya Zueva), Best Editor of a short film (Oksana Mysina), Best Sound Design (Oksana Mysina), Best Original Score (Sergei Kuchmenko).

52-54. 2023 – Art Film Awards, Skopje, North Macedonia, cites Cherry Orchard. War for two honors: Oksana Mysina is a Finalist for Best Director of a Short Film, and the film is a Finalist in the Best Experimental Film category, and names Oksana Mysina's music video "Ivan Petrovich" a Finalist in the Best Music Video category.

55-56. 2023 – Swedish Academy of Motion Picture Awards names Cherry Orchard. War a Finalist in the Best Experimental Film category, and names Escape a Finalist in the Best Film on Women category.

57-58. 2023 – Black Owl Film Festival in Bodrum, Turkey, gives two awards to Love is Stronger than Fear: Best Short Documentary Film, and Best Original Score.

59-62. 2023 – Dona Paula International Film Awards in Goa, India, awards prizes in two categories to Voices of the New Belarus: Best Foreign Language Documentary Film and Best Innovative Concept, and honors Ivan Petrovich in two categories: Special Award: Comedy, and Best Actor (Alexander Kochubei).

63-63. 2023 – Atlantis Cinema Fiesta, New York City, names "Ivan Petrovich" a Finalist in the Music Video category and names Cherry Orchard. War a Winner 1st Degree in the Cinema Against War category.

65-66. 2024 – Barcelona Independent Film Festival names Cherry Orchard. War Best Experimental Film, and names Voices of the New Belarus Best Documentary.

67-70. 2024 – Lotus International Film Festival awards Cherry Orchard. War three prizes: 1) Best Experimental Short Film, 2) Best Director of a Short, 3) Best Women's Short, and names Voices of the New Belarus Best Documentary Film.

71. 2024 – California Indies Film Festival names Cherry Orchard. War a Nominee.

72. 2024 – Tokyo International Cinema Awards names Love is Stronger than Fear a Nominee.

73. 2024 – Leda Monologues Film Festival (Greece) names Escape a Finalist.

74-76. 2024 – Stockholm City Film Festival names Voices of the New Belarus a Finalist, and Cherry Orchard. War and Ivan Petrovich Semi-Finalists.

77-78. 2024 – Cinema Carnival, Pisa, Italy, names Red, Blue and Asya Best Independent Film and names Escape Best War Film.

79. 2024 – Berlin Shorts Award names Voices of the New Belarus Best Human Rights Film.

80-82. 2024 – Karditsa International Short Film Festival in Karditsa, Greece, awarded Love is Stronger than Fear an Honorable Mention award, and names Escape and Cherry Orchard.War Semi-Finalists.

83-84. 2024 – Palma Film Festival on the island of Mallorca, Spain, awards two prizes to Love is Stronger than Fear: 1) Best No-Budget Film, 2) Best Composer.

85. 2024 - Tokyo International Cinema Awards names Molly a Nominee.

86-87. 2024 - Atlantis Cinema Fiesta in New York City names both Molly and How to Survive Autumn as Winners, First Degree.

88-89. 2024 - Art Film Awards in Skopje, North Macedonia gives How to Survive Autumn an Honorable Mention, and names Molly a Finalist.

90-92. 2025 - Mokkho International Film Festival in India awards Molly in three categories: 1) Best Narrative Short Film, 2) Critics Choice Award - Best Actress, 3) Honorable Mention - Best Producers.

93. 2025 - Dublin Movie Awards names Molly a Semi-Finalist.

94. 2025 - San Francisco Women Film Festival names Molly a Semi-Finalist.

95. 2025 - Miami Women Film Festival names A Woman and her Angels a Nominee.

96. 2025 - Eastern Europe Film Festival awards Ketty Koraka a Best Actress - Honorable Mention for A Woman and her Angels.

97. 2025 - Paris Women CineFest proffers a Best Producer award on A Women and her Angels.

98-99. 2025 - Palermo International Film Festival names Molly and How to Survive Autumn Semi-Finalists.

100. 2025 - Cannes Art Film Fest names A Woman and her Angels a Nominee.

101. 2025 - Eutopia Arthouse Film Festival names Molly Best Super Short Film.

102. 2025 - Stockholm City Film Festival names A Woman and her Angels a Finalist.

103-104. 2025 - San Francisco Arthouse Short Festival names How to Survive Autumn and Molly Semi-Finalists.

105-106. 2025 - Hollywood International Golden Age Festival names A Woman and her Angels Best International Feature, and declares Oksana Mysina Best Actress for her performance in Molly.

107-108. 2025 - Athens International Monthly Art Film Festival names How to Survive Autumn a Finalist, and Molly an Honorable Mention.

109. 2025 - Vienna Indie Film Festival names A Woman and her Angels Best Experimental Film.

110. 2025 - New York International Women Festival names A Woman and her Angels a Semi-Finalist.

111. 2025 - Chicago Indie Awards names A Woman and her Angels a Nominee.

112-113. 2025 - Independent Film Awards (UK) bestows an Honorable Mention on A Woman and her Angels, and names How to Survive Autumn a Finalist.

114. 2025 - Frames of New York bestows a Best Ensemble Cast on A Woman and her Angels.

115. 2025 - Oakland Film Festival names Ketty Koraka Best Actress for her role in A Woman and her Angels.

116. 2025 - Calgary Indie Film Awards names A Woman and her Angels a Semi-Finalist.

117-118. 2026 - Cinema Royale: Paris Edition names A Woman and her Angels Best Experimental Feature, and additionally cites Oksana Mysina as Best Director of an Experimental Feature.

119. 2026 - Silver Screen Film Festival, Prague, names A Woman and her Angels Best Experimental Feature.

=== Music videos ===
1. 2007 – "Potion for Eternal Love," Oksana Mysina and Oxy Rocks perform at Eldar Ryazanov's 80th birthday bash in Moscow. Lyrics by Oksana Mysina, music by Dmitry Yershov. Oxy Rocks is: Oksana Mysina – vocals; Sergei Shchetinin – lead guitar; Dmitry Yershov – bass; Sergei Kuchmenko – keyboards; Grigory Gaberman – drums.

2. 2012 – "The World on Edge," dir. by Konstantin Olonovsky – Oksana Mysina and Oxy Rocks. Lyrics by Oksana Mysina, music by Dmitry Yershov. Mix by Valery Cherkesov. Oxy Rocks is: Oksana Mysina – vocals; Sergei Shchetinin – lead guitar; Dmitry Yershov – bass; Sergei Kuchmenko – keyboards; Grigory Gaberman – drums. Cameraman – Dmitry Shabaldin. Edited by Sergei Tsunaev and Igor Martynov. Actors – Katya Grebenkova and Oleg Gusev.

3. 2012 – "The Sky Above Me," dir. by Konstantin Olonovsky – Oksana Mysina and Oxy Rocks. Lyrics by Oksana Mysina, music by Dmitry Yershov. Mix by Valery Cherkesov. Oxy Rocks is: Oksana Mysina – vocals; Sergei Shchetinin – lead guitar; Dmitry Yershov – bass; Sergei Kuchmenko – keyboards; Grigory Gaberman – drums. Edited by Sergei Tsunaev and Igor Martynov.

4. 2023 – "Ivan Petrovich," dir. by Oksana Mysina - Oksana Mysina and Oxy Rocks. Lyrics by Oksana Mysina, music by Sergei Shchetinin. Mix by Valery Cherkesov. Oxy Rocks is: Oksana Mysina – vocals; Sergei Shchetinin – vocals and lead guitar; Dmitry Yershov – bass; Sergei Kuchmenko – keyboards; Grigory Gaberman – drums.

=== Radio ===
1. 2007 Giselle by Olga Mikhailova, dir. by Alexander Lebedev – Author's voice / Natasha

2. 2008 – Dead Souls by Nikolai Gogol, dir. by Viktor Trukhan – Lady, pleasant in all respects.

3. 2010-2015 – Where Words End, a weekly radio program about physically challenged musicians, hosted by Oksana Mysina on Radio Orpheus, Moscow.

4. 2011 – The Blonde by Alexander Volodin, dir. by Dmitry Nikolaev, music by Oksana Mysina and Oxy Rocks – Ira
