= Mockevičius =

- Lithuanian surname
- m.: Mockevičius
- f.: (unmarried): Mockevičiūtė,
- f.: (married): Mockevičienė
- Related names: Mackevič, Mackiewicz, Matskevich

Mockevičius is a Lithuanian surname. Notable people with the surname include:

- Egidijus Mockevičius
- Mantas Mockevičius
- Skirmantas Mockevičius, Lithuanian politician
