= Dictionary of Emotions in a Time of War: 20 Short Works by Ukrainian Playwrights =

Anthology of current Ukrainian drama

A Dictionary of Emotions in a Time of War: 20 Short Works by Ukrainian Playwrights is an anthology collecting one work each by the 20 founding members of the Theater of Playwrights (ToP) in Kyiv, Ukraine. It was compiled, edited and introduced by John Freedman and published by Laertes Press in the U.S. in 2023. Its texts "function as documentary sources of sorts, recording visceral responses to Russia's full-blown invasion of Ukraine. [...] But beyond bearing witness, these twenty texts manifest as addends to a centuries-old Ukrainian cultural consciousness, on whose repudiation rest the disingenuous Russian justifications for war."

One of the purposes of this collection, stated in its introduction, was to counteract claims that Russian president Vladimir Putin has made to justify his invasion of Ukraine, namely, that there is no independent Ukrainian culture, language, or state. "Beneath the surface, and grouping all of these plays into a coherent whole, is the authors' conviction that ever since 24 August 1991 Ukraine has been an independent country with its own legal system, geographical borders, language, traditions, economy, citizens, values – and its own internal issues and problems to solve."

== Contents ==
The anthology's authors in order of appearance are: Olena Astasieva, Tetiana Kytsenko, Oksana Grytsenko, Anastasiia Kosodii, Andriy Bondarenko, Lena Lagushonkova, Julia Gonchar, Vitaliy Chenskiy, Natalia Blok, Kateryna Penkova, Liudmyla Tymoshenko, Oksana Savchenko, Pavlo Arie, Olena Hapieieva, Iryna Harets, Olha Maciupa, Ihor Bilyts, Natalya Vorozhbyt, Yevhen Markovskiy, and Maksym Kurochkin. Each author depicts "their own reactions to war events, as well as their own sensitivities and philosophies of life. They express them in their own individual styles, often employing jarring verbal and/or literary images. There are unforgettable scenes and situations, or expressions of explosive emotions and salient thoughts about the present and the future. Several authors here also seem to enjoy experimenting with literary subgenres."

The anthology's title is drawn from Olena Astasieva's episodic piece, "A Dictionary of Emotions in a Time of War." Like most of the texts, this piece is a mixture of reality and fiction, memory and imagination. And, while every text offers some viewpoint on the impact of the Russian invasion on Ukraine and Ukrainians, no one author's viewpoint is identical with the others. "When so much of the narrative surrounding the war on Ukraine requires Ukrainians to simultaneously perform the roles of perfect victims and perfect heroes, this rage and hatred is a liberating experience for the reader. [...] In each case, the combined talents of playwright and translator have created something quite extraordinary, free from cliché and the tired metaphors of war."

The short works, in the eyes of one reader, are "performative texts, reminiscent of short plays and monologues, experimental texts that cross borders between short stories and/or films, diary entries that capture the very personal experience of living through the first days of war." According to another commentator, the writers' "work exists, to abstract Muriel Rukeyser’s words, as a 'vital national resource.' They head the rush of change that revitalizes a culture under threat of death, and locate new forms and meanings to generate this change."

All of the texts have been performed in some way (readings, productions, films, videos, recordings) as part of the Worldwide Ukrainian Play Readings which is curated by the anthology editor John Freedman.

== Publication history and details ==
A Dictionary of Emotions in a Time of War... was published by Laertes Press in two iterations. The first, appearing in early January 2023 in the publisher's Egret Acting Editions imprint, differs in some ways from the second iteration. Contributor Yevhen Markovskiy was trapped under Russian occupation in the city of Kherson and could not deliver a text before the first iteration went to press. As described in the introduction, the publisher "honored Markovskiy as one of the founding members of ToP with a dedicated page in place of the text he hoped to write."

The second iteration was published October 3, 2023, under the Egret imprint of Laertes Press, included an expanded and updated introduction, and, as described in the book, offered the texts of eight songs that Markovskiy delivered before press date. It was positioned in 21st place in the Telegraph Culture Desk's 50 best books of 2023; and was awarded a bronze IPPY in the category of Current Events: Social Issues/ Humanitarian in 2024.

John Freedman, working with Nataliia Bratus on 14 texts, translated 18 of the 20 total texts. John Farndon translated two of the works, collaborating with Evgeniya Kovryga on one of those.

In the last week of September 2024, the Ukrainian newspaper and internet portal Ukrainska Pravda began streaming an audio podcast titled A Dictionary of Ukrainian Emotions. It comprised readings of nine of the book's texts as performed by actors Alessandra Torresani (reading Anastasiia Kosodii's "How to Talk to the Dead"), Kristin Milward (Oksana Savchenko's "I Want to Go Home"), Wayne Maugans (Oksana Grytsenko's "The Peed-Upon Armored Personnel Carrier"), Joe Spano (Tetiana Kytsenko's "Call Things by their Names"), Kevin McMonagle (Bondarenko's "Survivor's Syndrome"), Kathleen Chalfant (Iryna Harets's "Planting an Apple Tree"), Jessica Hecht (Olha Maciupa's "Flowering"), Sharon Washington (Liudmyla Tymoshenko's "My Tara"), and Kushtrim Hoxha (Maksym Kurochkin's "Three Attempts to Improve Daily Life"). Each episode included conversations about the works with the actors or the writers.
