= Tanya Weinstein =

Tanya Weinstein (born in Saint-Petersburg, Russia) is a stage director, actress, and tutor. She is a co-founder and creative director of the Skorokhod Venue as well as the International Theatrical Centre "Lyogkiye Lyudi". She is a member of the Drama Instructors Guild and Stage Directors Guild.

Tanya works with documentary theatre, verbatim theatre, contemporary dance, and performance art. As an instructor in acting, psychophysical training and stage movement lead theater workshops in Russia and Europe, heads classes in International Theatrical Centre "Lyogkiye Lyudi". As a creative director, she chose the best projects and teams (international or local) to show the audience of Saint-Petersburg the most unusual, modern and beautiful performances.

She is married to Alexander Weinstein and lives in Helsinki, Finland.

== Biography ==
- 2003-2008 Saint-Petersburg State Theatrical Academy, Puppet Theatre Department, area of expertise: stage director.
- What about an extended education: since 1999 to 2003 – Saint-Petersburg State University, Department of History. Qualifications: ethnography and anthropology.
- From 2004 to 2005 – Derevo Theater company courses. Next year - Arts Academy, Turku, Finland. Qualifications: puppet and objects theatre, choreography.
- In 2013 – up to now master's degree program in modern choreography of Vaganova Russian Ballet Academy.
- 2005-2012 – Active participation in more than 20 various master classes on the art of acting, puppet theatre, contemporary choreography, body theatre, performing, the most significant being the master classes of Yuri Alshits, Kama Ginkas, Paul Zivkovich (Great Britain/Australia), Paskalina Noel (France), Marina Maskarell (Netherlands/Spain), Seke Chimutengwende (Great Britain)

== Stage productions ==
2010 and earlier

- "A Winter Story", Boston Puppet Theatre, USA.
- "The Holocaust. Mother", The International Theatrical Centre "Lyogkiye Lyudi", Saint-Petersburg.
- "White Against Black", stage version of R. Gallego's novel, The International Theatrical Centre "Lyogkiye Lyudi", Saint-Petersburg.
- "The Bronze Horseman: an interpretation experience", screen version of A.Pushkin's poem, Dzampano Puppet theatre, Saint-Petersburg.
- "The very Hedgehog", staged play of K.Fyodorov, based on S. Kozlov's fairy-tales, The State Children Puppet Theater Company "The Pie Doggie".
- "The Old Man and the Sea", stage version of E.Hemingway's work, Dzampano Puppet theatre.
- "Sadko", Novgorod Academy Drama Theater after F. M. Dostoyevskiy. Novgorod.
- "Tuu, tuu, tupacorulla...", a stage version of "Old Gentry" by N.Gogol, Turku Arts Academy, Puppet Theater Department, Finland, Turku.
- "Good Morning", Derevo Company, Saint-Petersburg - Dresden.

2011

- "Iliad", staged play of K.Fyodorov, Dzampano Puppet Theatre, Saint-Petersburg.
- "Comeback", The International Theatrical Centre "Lyogkiye Lyudi", Saint-Petersburg.
- "A Cow", stage version of A. Platonov's story, The International Theatrical Centre "Lyogkiye Lyudi", Saint-Petersburg.
- "My Love Stories in Brief", staged specially for the art festival STAGE, Korjaamo Theatre, Finland, Helsinki.
- "The Third", Irga Company (joint performance of Tanya Priyatkina and Sasha Lyubashin), Saint-Petersburg.

2012

- "Baby blues" (joint performance of L. Burdinskaya, G. Samoilova and A.Budanova), Skorokhod Venue, Saint-Petersburg
- "Tropic of Cancer", a stage version of Henry Miller's novel, The International Theatrical Centre "Lyogkiye Lyudi", Saint-Petersburg.

2013

- Stage play "Suds of Days", Skorokhod Venue, Saint-Petersburg.
- "Honey taste of fruits", Irga company (joint performance of Tanya Priyatkina and Sasha Lyubashin), Skorokhod Venue, Saint-Petersburg.
