= Max Korzh =

Belarusian singer and songwriter (born 1988)

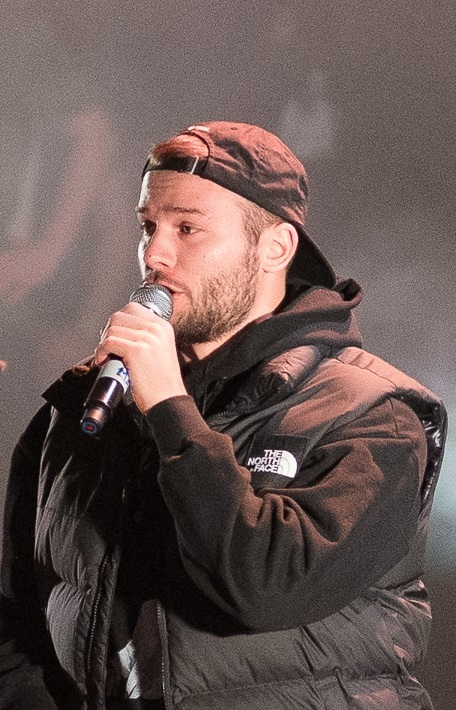
- Korzh in 2018

Background information
- Born: Maksim Anatolyevich Korzh; November 23, 1988 (age 37); Luninyets, Byelorussian SSR, Soviet Union
- Origin: Belarus
- Genres: Hip hop; alternative rock; rap rock
- Occupations: Rapper; singer; songwriter; director
- Years active: 2006–present
- Spouse: Tatsyana Korzh (Note: Belarusian: Таццяна Корж; Russian: Татьяна Корж, romanized: Tatyana Korzh) (née Matskevich)
- Website: maxkorzh.live

Maksim Anatolyevich Korzh (Belarusian: Максім Анатольевіч Корж; Russian: Максим Анатольевич Корж; born November 23, 1988), known professionally as Max Korzh (Russian: Макс Корж), is a Belarusian rapper, singer, songwriter and director.

== Early life ==
Korzh was born in 1988 in the city of Luninyets, which was then part of the Byelorussian SSR in the Soviet Union. His parents were both entrepreneurs, and through them he is distantly related to Vasily Korzh, a Hero of the Soviet Union. At a young age, Max Korzh was enrolled into music school by his parents. At the age of 16, Korzh started his first band called "Lun Clan", which stood for Luninyets clan, alongside his friends but the band didn't last long and dissolved. Lun Clan performed in the Belarusian language, and in 2007 they released their debut album "Razmaulyay sa mnoy pa-belarusku", consisting of eight songs. The band broke up in 2010 after performing for the last time at a festival dedicated to Belarusian-language rap music. Korzh was a part of a couple other projects, although none of them proved to be successful.

Korzh recorded his first solo song while studying at Belarusian State University; the biggest university in Belarus. During the 3rd year of studying at the university, he decided to drop out and concentrate on his music career. He borrowed $300 from his mom, went to a studio and recorded "Nebo pomozhet nam" (English: "Sky Will Help Us") and posted it on VKontakte, the biggest Russian social network. Shortly after he was enlisted in the military. The co-producers of the "Nebo pomozhet nam" were electronic duo "Magic Sound". When he returned from military service, he learned that the song went viral and gotten big in Belarus. The track "Nebo pomozhet nam" (English: "Sky Will Help Us") garnered a big following and got airtime on the radio. To make it gain more popularity, Korzh then proceeded to send the track to various Minsk DJ's for them to play at parties.

== Solo career ==
On April 7, 2012, Korzh released his first ever music video, "Nebo pomozhet nam" (English: Sky Will Help Us"). On May 1, 2012, he released his debut album "Zhivotniy mir" (English: "Animal World"), which consisted of 16 tracks, each written by Korzh himself. Later that same year he signed with a Russian record label: Respect Production.

When asked about the theme for his debut album by a Russian publication "Argumenty i Fakty", Korzh said in a statement:

"I've been writing these songs for three years. And I noticed they all fall fit thematically, which I titled "Animal World". This album is for different ages: from teens to more adult people. The main theme is human sin, from cheating to committing a crime".

In the early stages of 2013 Korzh went on his "The Take-Off March" tour around Belarus, Ukraine and Russia. One show took place at the Minsk Sports Palace in his home country of Belarus and he hesitated to take on the venue because he felt that "we could have lost a tonne of money" but eventually decided to go with it and the venue sold 6,500 tickets.

In the summer of 2013 Korzh was nominated as a Breakthrough Artist at Muz-TV Awards.

On November 2, 2013, Korzh had the honour of becoming the first Belarusian musical artist to have ever performed a sold-out show in Belarus, Minsk-Arena for 13,000 people.

Reputable Russian magazine ‘Afisha-Volna’ described Korzh's music as "pop-rap with club energy and street honesty" and said its "hybrid of genres presents 100% bestsellers that tend to stick in your head". and sold out Moscow's Luzhniki Palace of Sports.

In June 2014, Korzh won the nomination for Best Album at Muz-TV Awards for his second album "Zhit’ V Kaif".

On November 8, 2014, Korzh released his third album "Domashniy" ("Domestic/ Homely").

In June 2015 Korzh was nominated for three awards at Muz-TV Awards: Best Hip-Hop Artist, Best Album and Best Live Show.

On December 16, 2017, Korzh now marked his second sold-out show in Minsk-Arena.

In 2016 and 2017 Korzh decided to release his fourth album in 2 parts; The first part in 2016 and the second part in 2017. He titled the fourth album "Maliy povzroslel" (English: "The Boy Has Grown"). The first part was released in 2016, "Maliy povzroslel, Pt.1" (English: "The Boy Has Grown Pt.1") and the second part in 2017, "Maliy povzroslel, Pt.2" (English: "The Boy Has Grown, Pt.2"). On December 22, 2017, his "Maliy povzroslel" album won the VK Music Award.

In 2018 Korzh had his first ever tour of the United States.

== Personal life ==
Since 2012, he has been married to Tatsyana (nee Matskevich), also a native of Luninyets. Together, they have two children: a daughter Emilia born in 2013 and a son Nazar born in 2019.

In October 2024, a Telegram channel close to GUBOPiK wrote that Max Korzh left Belarus after being summoned “for a talk” for political reasons. It was later stated that GUBOPiK had summoned him regarding complaints of displaying the white-red-white flag at concerts abroad and for his earlier condemnation of the war. GUBOPiK responded by saying no criminal case was opened, but that if he were in the future to associate with people that the organisation deemed extremist, there would.

=== Political positions ===
Korzh largely avoided public political statements until 2020, when he posted on Instagram to urge protestors who were marching against the Belarusian government to stop for safety reasons. However, it was alleged that he did attend the protests later on, and was seen near Okrestina and the site of the death of Alexander Taraikovsky. Following the start of the Russian invasion of Ukraine, he publicly condemned the war and released a track entitled "Svoj dom" (My Home), which was widely interpreted as an anti-war song and thus was not made available in Belarus or Russia. Shortly after its release, his tour of Russia was canceled by the organisers, and in response he canceled his tours of Belarus and Ukraine, saying he could not sing when people were being killed. Later on in September 2023, during a concert in Riga he called on the audience to chant "No to war". He later in August 2025 in Warsaw again confirmed his support for peace in Ukraine.

== Discography ==
=== Studio albums ===
2012 — "Zhivotniy mir" (Animal World)

2013 — "Zhit’ v kaif" (Live Dope/ Life Is Good)

2014 — "Domashniy" (Domestic)

2016 — "Maliy povzroslel, pt. 1" (Boy Has Grown, Pt.1)

2017 — "Domashniy (Extended Version)" (Domestic, Extended Version)

2017 — "Maliy povzroslel, pt. 2" (Boy Has Grown, Pt.2)

2021 — "Психи попадают в топ" (Psychos Hit The Top)

=== Remix albums ===
2016 — "Best Remixes"

=== Singles ===
2016 — "Slovo patsana (The Word of a Man) (Bassquaid & ST Remix)»

2016 — "Slovo patsana (The Word of a Man) (Subranger Remix)»

2017 — "Optimist»

2018 — "Proletarka" (Proletariat Station)

2019 — "Control»

2019 — "Shantazh" (Blackmail)

2019 — "2 tipa lyudey" (2 Types of People)

2020 — "Raznesem" (Crash the Stadium)

2020 — "Maloletka" (Young Lass)

2020 — "Maliy povzroslel (Boy Has Grown) (Apashe Remix)»

2020 — "Maloletka (Young Lass) (Rozochka Remix)»

2020 — "Vremena" (Times)

2020 — "Teplo" (Warm)

2020 — "Yeyo vinoy" (Her Fault)

2021 — "Attestat" (GCSE)

2021 — "Ne tvoy" (Not Yours)

2022 — "Svoj dom" (My Home)

2022 — "Eto nash put’" (This is our way)

2022 — "Beregi yeyo" (Take Care of Her)

2023 — "Luchshiy vajb (The Best Vibe) (Rozochka Remix)»

2023 — "Peredel" (Redevelopment)

2024 — "Stress"

2024 — "Kholodnoe utro" (Cold Morning)

2024 — "Moya devochka ne verit mne" (My Girl Doesn't Believe Me)

2025 — "Wake Up"

2026 — "What do you carry"

2026 — "With us or not"

=== Official clips ===
Year	Video	Director
2012	Nebo pomozhet nam (The Sky Will Help Us)	Max Korzh
2012	Gde ya (Where Am I) (First Version)	Max Korzh
2012	Gde ya (Where Am I) (Second Version)	Egor Abramenko
2013	V temnote (In The Dark)	Ivan Lebedev
2013	Zhit’ v kaif (Life Is Good)	Alexey Bochenin
2014	Motyle’k (Papillon)	Max Korzh
2014	Stan’ (Become)	Rustam Romanov
2014	Amsterdam	Max Korzh
2014	Domashniy (Homely)	Max Korzh
2014	Ne vydumyvay (Do Not Make Stuff Up)	Max Korzh
2015	Plamenniy svet (Fire Light)	Max Korzh
2015	Flat (feat. F.O.T.H)	Max Korzh
2016	Bessonitsa (Insomnia)	Anton Mamonenko
2016	Slovo patsana (The Word Of A Man)	Max Korzh
2016	Moy droog (My Friend)	Anton Mamonenko
2016	Style’vo (Stylish)	Andrey Svetlov
2017	Maliy povzroslel (The Boy Has Grown)	Max Korzh, Mitriy Semenov-Aleinikov
2017	Maliy povzroslel 2.0 (The Boy Has Grown) (Rozochka Remix)	Max Korzh
2017	Optimist	Max Korzh
2017	Napalm	Max Korzh
2018	Malinoviy zakat (Raspberry Sunset)	Max Korzh
2018	Gory po koleno (Knee High Mountains)	Max Korzh
2019	Control	Max Korzh
2019	Shantazh (Blackmail)	Max Korzh, Andrey Svetlov
