= Mackevič =

Mackevič is a Lithuanian-language spelling of the Polish surname Mackiewicz. Another Lithuanization, including Lithuanian surname morphology, is Mackevičius. Notable people with this surname include:

- Michal Mackevič (born 1953), Lithuanian Polish journalist and politician
- Zygmunt Mackevič, Lithuanian Polish biologist and politician
