= Insulted. Belarus Worldwide Readings Project =

The Insulted. Belarus Worldwide Readings Project is a program of dramatic readings that expresses international solidarity with the people of Belarus. Insulted. Belarus is a play by Andrei Kureichik that highlights corruption and cruelty during the regime of President Alexander Lukashenko, specifically in the early days of the 2020-2021 Belarusian protests, and depicts the Belarusian people as courageous and peaceful in desperate times.

Andrei Kureichik, playwright, screenwriter and filmmaker wrote Insulted. Belarus (Russian: Обиженные. Беларусь(сия)) in August and September 2020 at the height of the protests. By the first week in November 2020, Insulted. Belarus had been translated into 18 languages and had been given 77 readings of various kinds in 22 countries. As of October 2024, the Insulted Belarus Worldwide Readings Project had helped to organize more than 280 readings, productions, videos, films, installations, and other kinds of events. These events took place in over 30 countries, with Insulted. Belarus being translated 24 times into 21 languages, and published in nine languages.

== The Play: Insulted. Belarus ==
Andrei Kureichik wrote Insulted. Belarus in Russian, which, with Belarusian language, is one of two official languages in Belarus. The original title, Обиженные. Беларусь(сия), includes a play on words that refers to the Soviet-era name of Belorussia, as well as to the contemporary name, Belarus. A literal English translation of the title might render it as The Insulted Ones. Belarus(this), where “Belarus(this)” also renders something close to “Belorussia.” This has been rendered in various ways in the many translations. (See The Translations below). As reported in The Stage, “Kureichik, a member of Belarus’ Coordination Council for the transition of power, wrote the play as a rapid response to those first days of protests, arrests and violence meted out by the police. He wrote it quickly, capturing the urgency of the situation and went into hiding immediately after finishing.” Kureichik described the writing of the play in an interview with BBC radio: “On the 9th of August, when Belarus elections started revolution in Belarus, of course, as a playwright, as a citizen, I decided to react somehow.”

The play, according to Lucy Ash of the BBC, “is a series of intersecting monologues which capture the unfolding drama in the capital of Minsk. Some of the script is imagined, some taken from political speeches and voices overheard in the streets.” Kureichik has noted that the play is based, in part, on actual statements made by Lukashenko (known as Oldster in the play) and his political rival Sviatlana Tsikhanouskaya (Novice in the play), among others. On the Lukashenko character, Kureichik said, “I tried to understand him as well. I know his psychology. He thought people would love him forever. But it doesn’t work anymore.” Five other characters present an overview of Belarusian society:

- Mentor, an ageing teacher who believes in “law and order” and helps guarantee Lukashenko's reelections every four years by falsifying results;
- Corpse, an excitable soccer fan who is sick of living under the same president his entire life, and who is based, in part, on Alexander Taraikovsky, the first protester to die in the nascent Belarusian revolution
- Raptor, a storm trooper who trained during the Euromaidan Revolution in Ukraine and is now in Belarus to put down rebellions there
- Cheerful, a high-spirited, loving young woman, based loosely on the musician and political activist Maria Kalesnikava, who believes the Universe sends her good vibes, and whose sister is to marry the storm trooper
- Youth, Lukashenko's teenaged son Nikolai (Kolya for short), who is being groomed for the presidency, but would prefer to play internet games.

The lives of each of these individuals – with the possible exception of Kolya, for his debt to destiny is yet to be paid – is impacted tragically by Lukashenko's decision to crush the revolution with violence and torture.

== Translations ==
The first translation, into English, was done by John Freedman, who ultimately chose to simplify the play’s title because the pun could not be rendered sufficiently in the new language. Czech translator Martina Pálušová also writes about the difficulties of translating the title into Czech in an essay about the project. An excerpt of the English-language translation-in-progress – still called Insulted. Belarus(sia) – was published in Contemporary Theatre Review’s online Dispatches series, which provides immediate forums for important, developing themes in the theater world. The first full English text – as Insulted. Belarus – was published in Plays International & Europe magazine. Readings of the developing English translation were mounted in the United States, the United Kingdom, Hong Kong, Belgium, Finland, and Nigeria. English subtitles have been applied to videos made by the Divadlo Jozefa Gregora Tajovského (Jozef Gregor Tajovský Theater) in Zvolen, Slovakia; the Ivan Radoev Drama and Puppet Theater in Pleven, Bulgaria; and to a Russian-language film by Oksana Mysina.

Laertes Press published a book collection titled Insulted. Belarus; Voices of the New Belarus: Two Plays of Revolution in 2023. In 2025 a second, expanded collection titled The Insulted Plays included two new works, Insulted. Russia, and Insulted. Planet.

=== Other translations ===
- Bulgarian as Обидените. Беларус(сия) by Maya Pechnikova
- Cantonese as侮辱。白(俄)羅斯 by Phoebe Chan Yuk Lan
- Czech as Uražení. Bělo(R)usko by Martina Pálušová
- Dutch as Geschoffeerd. Belarus by Maaika van Rijn
- Estonian as Valgevene 2020 by Mari Torga
- Finnish as Loukatut. Belarus(sia) by Anni Lappela
- Georgian аs გაბრაზებული ბელორუსები by Lasha Gogniashvili
- German as Die Beleidigten. Belarus(sland) by Georg Dox
- German as Die Beleidigten. Belarus(sland) by Olga Kouvchinnikova and Ingolf Hoppmann
- Hungarian by Ágnes Kali
- Hungarian as Insulted. Belarus(sia) by Éva Patko
- Italian as Insultati. Bielorussia by Giulia Dossi
- Latvian as Aizvainotie by Yanina Ivanova
- Lithuanian as Įžeisti. Baltarusi(j)a by Andrius Jevsejevas
- Mandarin as 侮辱。白(俄)羅斯 by Phoebe Chan Yuk Lan
- Pidgin as Katakata by Jerry Adesewo
- Polish as Skrzywdzeni. Białoruś by Jakub Adamowicz
- Polish as Białoruś obrażona by Dariusz Jezierski
- Portuguese as Insultada. Bielorrússia by Bianca Stanea and Rita Marinho
- Romanian as Insultați Belarus(ia) by Raluca Rădulescu
- Slovak as Urazení. Bielo(R)usko by Romana Štorková Maliti
- Spanish as Los Insultados. Belarús by Luis Sorolla
- Spanish as Insultado. Bielorrusia by Carolina Herzlt
- Swedish as Sista droppen. Belarus(sia) by Mikael Nydahl
- Ukrainian as Ображені.Білорусь(сія) by Wolodimyr Kuchinsky

== Readings and Productions ==
Insulted. Belarus was written at the height of the COVID-19 pandemic when the vast majority of theaters around the world were closed. As such, directors and actors who had grown accustomed to meeting, rehearsing and even performing on the Zoom video communication app were ready and able quickly to mount readings online. Zoom was the most popular medium for making readings available, but some groups also posted their work on Facebook Live, YouTube, or on their own organizational websites. The various technologies and social media employed by theaters and groups of actors allowed creative teams properly to observe social distancing, for in most cases, the actors and directors worked from home before their computer monitors. Furthermore, “The reality of COVID-19 combined with the possibilities of the available technologies not only encouraged artists to work, they began to influence the work itself, the way it was made, and the form it assumed in the end.” In time, the readings became increasingly cinematic, beginning with the award-winning Russian film by Oksana Mysina, later including complex and stylized staged readings by Gabrielle Tuminaite at the Vilnius State Small Theatre of Lithuania; Javor Gardev at the Ivan Radoev Drama and Puppet Theater, Pleven, Bulgaria; and Jerzy Jan Połoński at Teatr Miejski in Gliwice, Poland.

The first reading in any language took place on 12 September 2020, in the original Russian, at the Kulish Academic Musical and Drama Theater in Kherson, Ukraine. It was directed by Sergei Pavlyuk. The same company mounted the world premiere of a full production onstage before a live audience on 1 October 2020. The first reading in the United States, directed by Igor Golyak in Russian, was mounted by Arlekin Players in Boston. The world premiere of the English text was performed in a Zoom reading by Rogue Machine Theater in Los Angeles on 18 September under the direction of Guillermo Cienfuegos. The premiere in the United Kingdom took place on 19 September, a reading directed by Bryan Brown for ARTEL and Maketank, in Exeter, England. The first full production in the U.S. was mounted by Frédérique Michel at City Garage in Santa Monica, CA, November 17-December 17, 2023. Critic Steven Stanley wrote this about it: "As highly political as it is deeply personal, Insulted. Belarus is contemporary theater at its most informative and impactful." This production was named Distinguished Production of a New International Play for 2023 in the annual Stage Raw theater awards for the Los Angeles area.

European theaters began joining the project in large numbers approximately one month after the play first appeared. Venues in the Czech Republic, Slovakia, Poland, Lithuania and Sweden mounted numerous readings in October, while in November the play was picked up by theater groups in Scotland, the Netherlands, Hong Kong (in English, Cantonese and Mandarin), Nigeria, Moldova, Romania, Holland, Belgium and other locations. The most massive single project within the project was organized by Raluca Rădulescu, a Romanian radio personality and translator, who organized 16 readings in 16 days at 16 venues in Romania and Moldova in February 2021.

Readings covered a vast range in terms of size and impact. There were small events at schools or colleges such as the readings at Strange Town Theatre Company in Edinburgh, Scotland, and St. Olaf College in Northfield, MN. The reading at the Birkbeck Centre for Contemporary Theatre in London, England, was essentially a private gathering organized by a group of politically active scholars and performers. However, established local or large national venues around the world made up the greater part of the project’s participants. The Jerzy Grotowski Institute in Wroclaw was one of the first groups in Poland to mount a reading. Rogue Machine Theater in Los Angeles cast the Hollywood actor Joe Spano in the role of Oldster. The National Theater in The Hague and virtually every major theater in Romania produced work.

A reading at the Royal Dramatic Theater in Sweden prompted Kureichik to say, “It’s an incredible feeling when you listen to your play performed in Swedish by actors you remember from Ingmar Bergman’s films. The fact that they came together to present a drama about our situation [in Belarus] and delivered an incredibly strong, emotional, artistic, and stylish reading – practically a performance – on the stage of one of the most respected theatres in the world, the Royal Dramatic Theatre of Stockholm, was very inspiring. Yesterday was one of the main milestones of the Insulted. Belarus project.” Writing for Swedish PEN, writer and director Jacob Hirdwall described the evening as follows: “The reading of Andrey Kureychik's play Insulted. Belarus(sia) took place at Elverket on October 27 in the presence of, among others, Sweden's Foreign Minister Ann Linde. A personal video greeting from [Belarusian opposition leader] Pavel Latushka also reached Dramaten's theater director Mattias Andersson and the foreign minister the same evening.”

The project increasingly attracted scholarly, journalistic and historical interest as time went on. Conferences, seminars, webinars, in-class teaching, and public discussions were hosted or conducted by HowlRound.com; multiple public, professional discussions hosted by the Bratislava Theater Institute in Slovakia; an online debate and discussion titled Art as Political Gesture: a Czech and Slovak contribution to the Day of Solidarity with Belarus in the Czech Republic; the Shakespeare Frankfurt Webinar for the First Annual World Theatre Day Symposium (one of four segments was devoted to the Worldwide Readings Project); an Arts and Culture Policy class at UC Berkeley, Goldman School of Public Policy; a Roundtable discussion with the participation of Kureichik and Giulia Dossi, Italian translator of Insulted. Belarus, at a PhD Conference at Universita di Verona. An Italian-language film, Insultati. Bielorussia, directed by Caterina Shulha, premiered at the Trieste Film Festival on January 25, 2022.

As of calculations done in April 2021, the readings had been performed by over 800 actors, and had reached over half a million spectators.

The scope of the project was summed up in Valleri J. Robinson's book, Belarusian Theatre and the 2020 Pro-Democracy Protests: "The play Insulted. Belarus. and the Freedman and Kureichik’s Worldwide Reading Project generated a remarkable and powerful network of theatre artists and scholars who found unique ways to participate in the project. In addition to 30 translations, hundreds of live and digital readings, live performances, and film screenings, there were dozens of publications, numerous fundraising events, and a website (insultedbelarus.com) launched by Bryan Brown to ensure that events surrounding the 2020 presidential election in Belarus are not forgotten. The astonishing scale of the project mobilizing international artists, which grew yet again following the start of the Russian War against Ukraine, testifies to the power and potential of arts workers to work together to resist autocracy."

== A Second Play: Voices of the New Belarus ==
In August 2021 Kureichik completed a follow-up play to Insulted. Belarus titled Voices of the New Belarus. This verbatim piece offered unedited voices of 16 individuals who had been arrested, tortured or murdered in the wake of the August 2020 revolution. (A production of the play in Legnice, Poland, featured an additional four characters at the request of the theater.) Kureichik explains: “I considered it important to record the crimes of the Lukashenko regime in documentary form. So that no one could say later that what was done to these people was someone’s imagination.”

Aside from a short, explanatory introduction by Kureichik, all the texts in the play are drawn from public sources and include interviews, published letters, essays, public statements, or court documents. In the first version of the play 14 voices were offered as monologues, two were combined in a dialogue. The original cast of characters was:

- Vitaly Marokko, logistics specialist
- Pyotr Kirik, furniture maker
- Maria Kalesnikava, musician
- Marina Karabanova, works in the information technology industry
- Sergei Melyanets, election volunteer, sales manager
- Nikolai Statkevich, politician
- Alexei Berezinsky, entrepreneur
- Roman Zorich, engineer
- Igor Losik, blogger
- Anatoly Kudlasevich, poet, prose writer, bard
- Andrei Proskurin, employed in the sphere of information technology
- Zhanna Lagutina, a typography worker, and Polina Zvezdova, temporarily unemployed
- Marina Zolotova, journalist, Chief Editor of the TUT.by internet portal
- Stepan Latypov, arboriculturist, resident of Square of Changes in Minsk
- Vitold Ashurok, social and ecological activist

As of late 2021, readings, videos or productions of Voices of the New Belarus had been mounted in the U.S., the U.K., Ukraine, Slovakia, the Czech Republic, Poland, Finland, Germany and Taiwan. Russian actress/director Oksana Mysina made a film with Russian and Belarusian actors, politicians, journalists and a musician performing the characters. It has been published twice in English (Plays International & Europe, Winter 2021, and in the Two Plays of Revolution collection) and in Polish (Dialog, January 2022).

In the summer of 2023, Kureichik himself created a so-called art installation film of the work that added two new characters - Nobel Peace Prize winner Ales Bialiatski and civic activist Polina Sharendo-Panasiuk. The role of Bialiatski in this version was read by the renowned historian Timothy Snyder.

=== Translations ===
- Cantonese as 敘説新白羅斯 by Chan Yuk-Lan Phoebe and Krissy Lam
- Czech as Hlasy nového Běloruska by Martina Pálušová
- English as Voices of the New Belarus by John Freedman
- Finnish as Uuden Valko-Venäjän äänet by Joel Lehtonen and Martti-Tapio Kuuskoski
- German as Stimmen aus dem neuen Belarus by Andreas Merz-Raykov and Ekaterina Raykova-Merz
- Polish as Głosy nowej Białorusi by Dariusz Jezierski
- Slovak as Hlasy Nového Bieloruska by Romana Štorková Maliti
