= Mackiewicz =

Mackiewicz is a Polish surname derived from the name Maciek, a diminutive of Maciej (Matthias). There are two archaic feminine forms: Mackiewiczowa (for married, literally "Mackiewicz's") and Mackiewiczówna (for unmarried, literally "daughter of Mackiewicz").

Other forms: Lithuanian (transcription from Polish): Mackevič; Lithuanianized: Mackevičius; Belarusian, Russian: Matskevich (transliteration from Cyrillic alphabet); Belarusian (using the Belarusian Latin alphabet or the official Latinization for geographical names): Mackievič.

Notable people with the surname include:

- Andrew Mackiewicz (born 1995), American Olympic saber fencer
- Antoni Mackiewicz, Polish name of Antanas Mackevičius (1828–1863), Lithuanian priest
- Felix Mackiewicz (1917–1993), Major League Baseball outfielder
- Józef Mackiewicz (1902–1985), Polish writer and publicist
- Karol Mackiewicz (born 1992), Polish footballer
- Lech Mackiewicz (born 1960), actor, director, playwright
- Michał Mackiewicz (born 1953), Polish-Lithuanian journalist and politician
- Mieczysław Mackiewicz (1880–1954), Polish general
- Stanisław "Cat" Mackiewicz (1896–1966), Polish political writer
- Tomasz Mackiewicz (1975–2018), Polish mountain climber
- Maria Kaczyńska (born Maria Mackiewicz), wife of Lech Kaczyński, the President of Poland.
