= Andrei Kureichik =

Belarusian film director, screenwriter, playwright (born 1980)

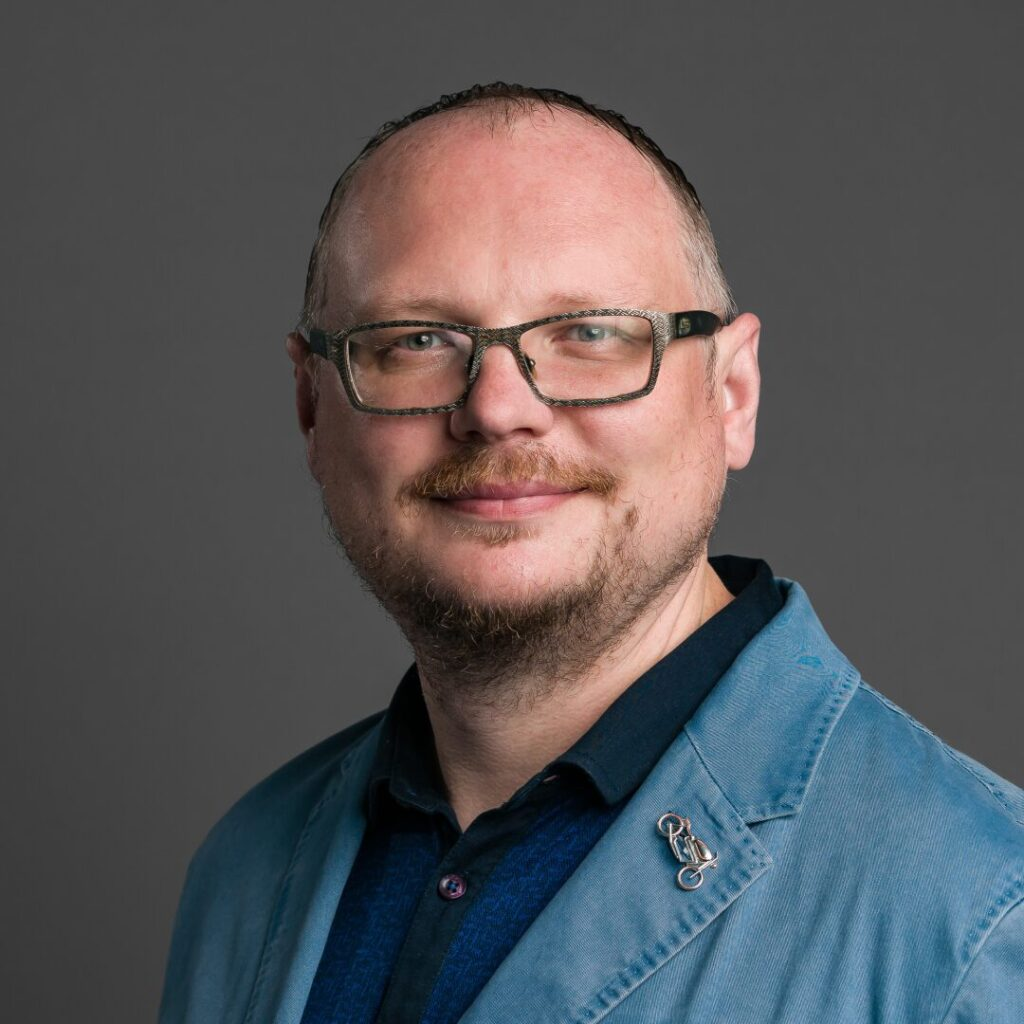
- Born: January 14, 1980 (age 46); Minsk, Belarusian SSR
- Occupations: Film director, screenwriter, playwright
- Awards: Independent literary award "Debut", prize of the jury of the Russian professional film production award "CUT!"
- Website: www.kureichik.ru

Andrei Kureichik (Belarusian Андрэй Уладзіміравіч Курэйчык; born January 14, 1980) is a Belarusian screenwriter, playwright, director, and publicist.

== Biography ==
Kureichik was born in Minsk. In his youth, he was trained by his father in Wushu and won the Minsk championship in 1992. He graduated from BSU Lyceum and then continued his studies at Belarusian State University (BSU) School of Law. As a sophomore at BSU, he had multiple part-time jobs, including scanning fingerprints in a forensic center and working in a law firm. Kureichik graduated from BSU with honors, specializing in administrative law and political science. He further completed the postgraduate program at BSU Department of Journalism and the film director's internship at the Chekhov Moscow Art Theater (2002) under the supervision of Oleg Tabakov, the People's Artist of the USSR.

From 2001 to 2002, Kureichik worked as a lawyer at Vlasova and Partners, an international law firm. He was also an assistant to the chairman of the Belarusian Union of Theater Workers fulfilling the responsibilities of press secretary and head of multiple art projects. Since 2002, he has authored over 150 articles as a commentator at Belorusskaya Gazeta, a top weekly political and economic newspaper. Kureichik also served as editor-in-chief of the National Television (ONT) and was on the creative team of the sociopolitical talk show Choice.

When he was 21, his play Paradise Lost was staged at the Chekhov Moscow Art Theater. Paradise Lost, as directed by Kureichik himself, next opened on the stage of the Yanka Kupala National Academic Theater on 9 November 2002. On 21 June 2003, the Chekhov Moscow Art Theater hosted another premiere under Kureichik's direction, The Piedmont Beast, which was one of the winners in the contemporary play competition established by Oleg Tabakov together with the Ministry of Culture of the Russian Federation. This play was later staged in many other theaters, including at the Mayakovsky Theatre in Moscow. From 2007 to 2020, Kureichik worked as a screenwriter in the cinema industry.

In 2003, he worked as an editor of Hotel of Desires Fulfillment, the first Belarusian television series. The Center for Contemporary Drama and Directing was founded by Kureichik within the Belarusian State Academy of Arts; the Center produced several performances and events. As an art director, he also established the International Festival of Contemporary Theater Open Format, the largest theater festival in Belarus.

In 2004, Kureichik completed an internship for managing non-profit organizations that was sponsored by the US Department of State. He was the artistic director of Diva Belaya Rus, a commercial festival of Belarusian women that was held at the Palace of the Republic, and he was invited to teach theatrical disciplines at the BSU Lyceum. Later, he created the radio program Theatrical Intermission with Andrei Kureichik on the national radio Culture and taught at the directing department of the Russian Academy of Theater Arts GITIS. In 2006, he was editor-in-chief of the Vestnik Kultury newspaper.

In 2007, Kureichik moved from Minsk, Belarus, to the village where his parents came from, near Smilovichi, and wrote the script for the film Love-Carrot-2. In 2010, he returned to Minsk with his family. His wife, Olga, was an actress at the Kupalov Theater and she performed in Memorial Prayer, Pavlinka, and several other performances. In 2012, with Dmitry Friga, Director Dmitry Marinin, and cameramen Alexei Korneev, Artyom Yakimov, and Nikita Pinigin, he founded the creative group Bez Buslou Arts.

By the age of 30, Kureichik had written 25 plays that were staged in 9 countries. By the age of 35, he had completed 15 film projects. Kureichik is a member of the Belarusian Literary Union Polotsk Branch and is on the jury of the literary prize committee named after Simeon Polotsky. He is a member of the Republican Public Council for Culture and Arts under the Council of Ministers. The total revenue generated from the films with his scripts amounted to 62 million dollars.

Kureichik gives master classes in different countries. He has also taught screenwriting at several universities in Russia, Belarus, and Lithuania.

In May 2020, during the 2020 Belarusian Presidential election campaign, he proposed a plan for changing the government without an election and a revolution. His suggestion to Viktor Babariko, one of the candidates for the presidency of the Republic of Belarus, was to create an organization or a party that would unite supporters of political change during the presidential election campaign. He was active in the 2020-2021 Belarusian protests which followed the scandalous presidential campaign which, by all reliable accounts, ended with the resounding defeat of the incumbent president Alexander Lukashenko, although Lukashenko defied everyone and crushed any attempts to remove him from power. On 17 August 2020, Kureichik became a member of the core committee of the Coordination Council to ensure the transfer of power in the Republic of Belarus. Kureichik, "slipped out of Belarus into Ukraine under the threat of arrest in mid-September 2020. He spent the next six-to-nine months living out of a suitcase. His wanderings took him from Ukraine, Sweden and Tanzania to Slovakia, where he finally received a Schengen visa for Europe, then on to Finland where he was given shelter for a year by an organization called Artists at Risk. In the spring of 2022 he spent two months at the University of Illinois, Urbana-Champaign as the George A. Miller Visiting Artist, and in the fall he completed a semester tenure in the Maurice R. Greenberg World Fellows Program at Yale University, before accepting a position as lecturer at Yale in January 2023."

In September 2020 Kureichik completed his play, Insulted. Belarus which gave rise to the Insulted. Belarus Worldwide Readings Project. He added the play Voices of the New Belarus in the summer of 2021. Both plays were made into award-winning films by actor-director Oksana Mysina, and, overall, the plays were given over 280 staged readings or full productions in 30 countries and 21 languages. Insulted. Belarus had its full-production U.S. premiere at City Garage Theater in Santa Monica, CA, running from Nov. 17 to Dec. 17, 2023, and winning the Distinguished International Project in the 2024 L.A. Stage Raw awards. Insulted. Belarus and Voices of the New Belarus were translated by John Freedman and published in a volume titled Two Plays of Revolution by Laertes Press in the United States in 2023.

Kureichik was a 2022 Maurice R. Greenberg World Fellow at Yale University, and, as of February 2024, was a Fortunoff Fellow and Henry Hart Rice Associate Research Scholar and Lecturer at Yale University.

In August 2021, Kureichik received direct death threats from agents of Lukashenko regime.

Mr. Kureichik continued his prolific professional writing career after leaving Belarus in 2020. His play Insulted. Planet (written in Russian) was debuted in a staged reading in Finnish translation at the Finnish National Theatre in September 2023. He wrote a documentary play, The Empty Shell of War, about the Holocaust culled from materials discovered in the archives at Yale in 2024, and in 2025 has delivered two new plays, The White Plague (based on Karel Čapek’s play The White Plague) and An Ocean Away, to the Theatre Novi Most in Minneapolis.

== Filmography ==
=== Director and screenwriter ===
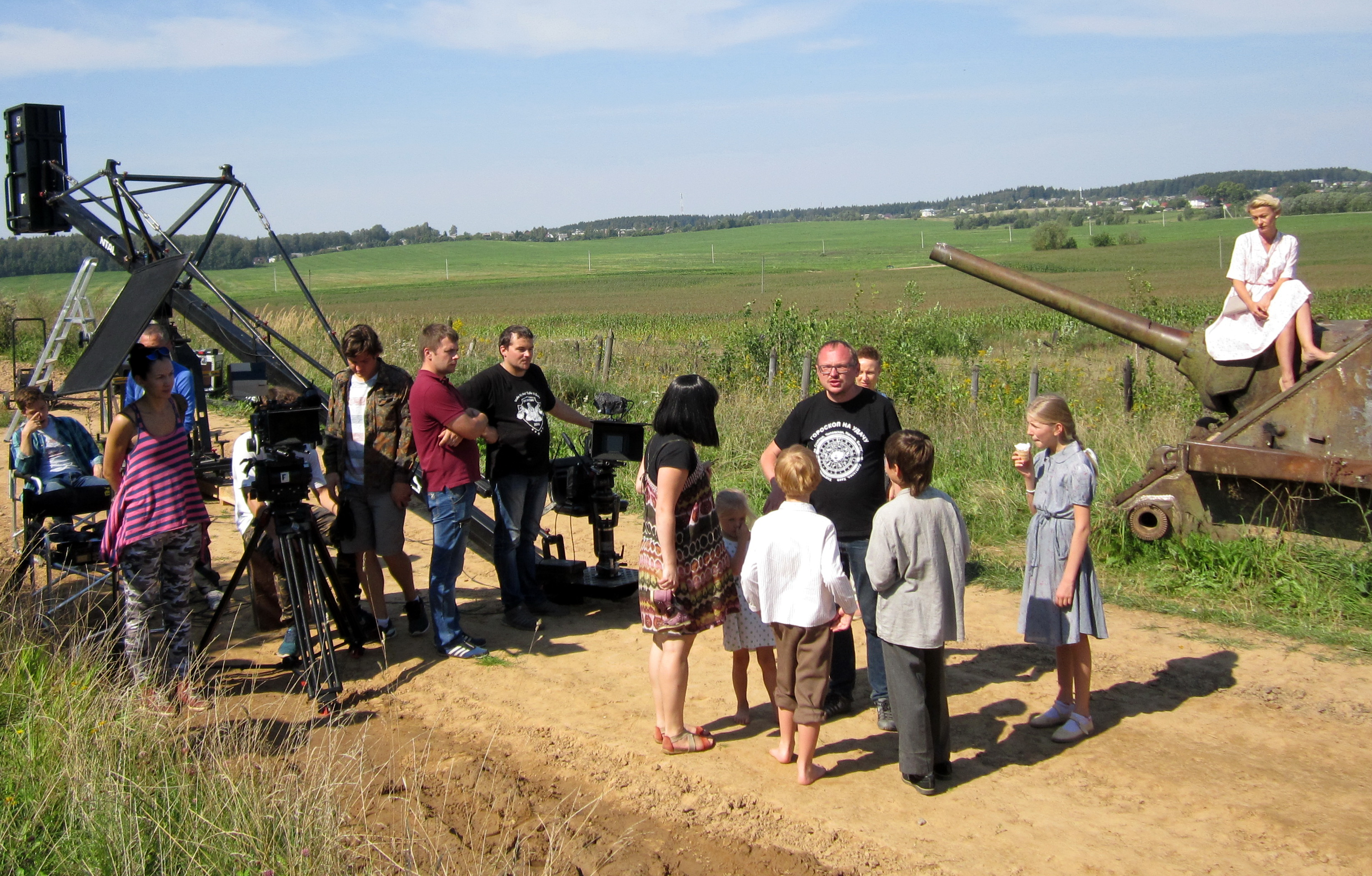
Kureichik on the set of PARTY-ZAN Film

- Lovey Dovey (2007)
- Lovey Dovey 2 (2008)
- Syomin (2009)
- Yulenka (2009)
- Christmas Trees (2010)
- Deadly Combat (2010)
- Syomin. Retribution (2011)
- Office Romance. Present Times (2011)

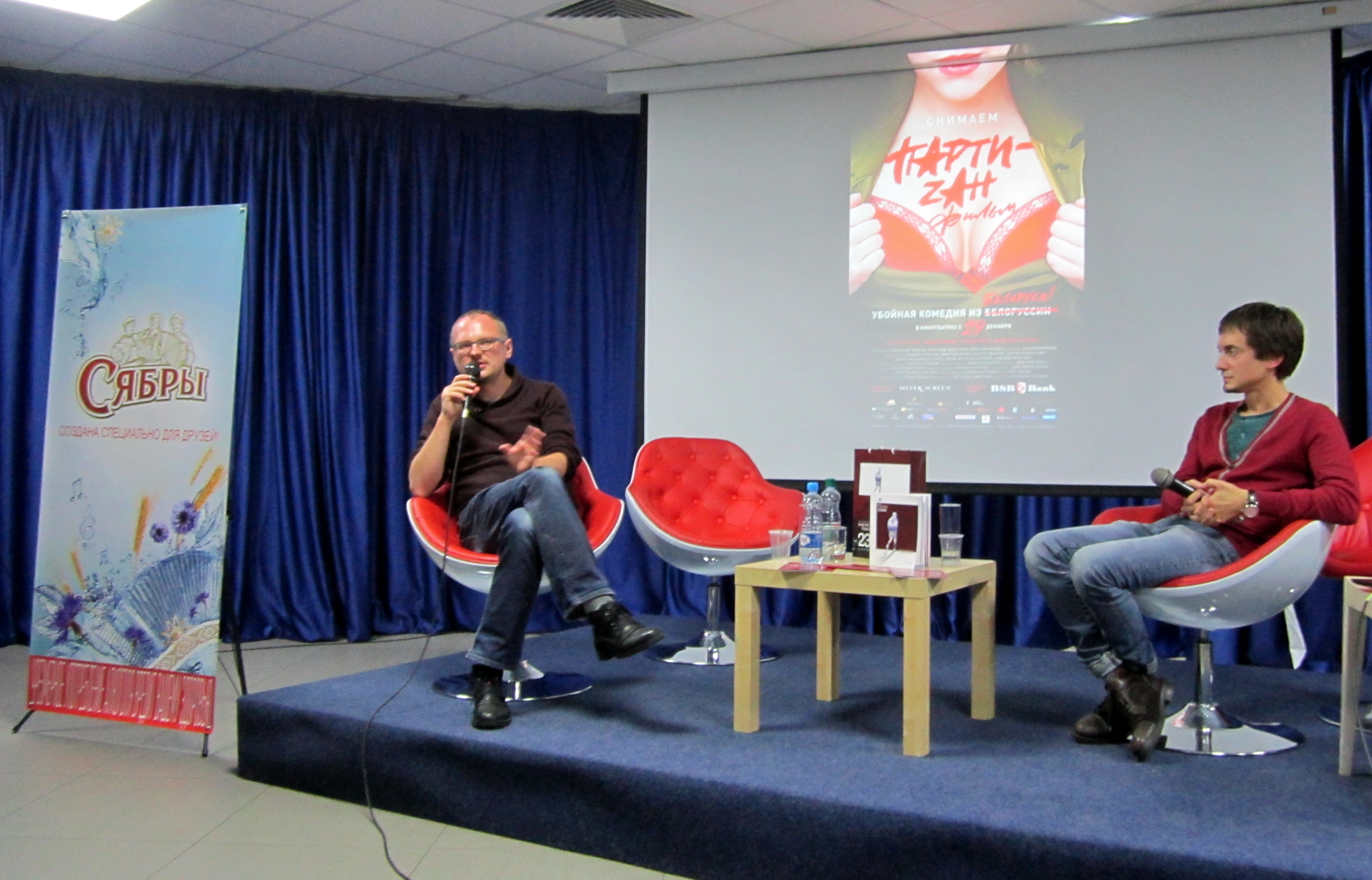
Kureichik at the Minsk International Film Festival "Listapad"

- I Will Wait (2012)
- Military Intelligence. First Strike (2012)
- Higher Than Sky (2012)
- Odessa-mama (2012)
- Petrovich (2012)
- No Right of Choice (2013)
- Vasilina Ivanovna Changes Profession (2014)
- Horoscope for Luck (2014)
- War of the Sexes (2015)
- GaraSh (2015)
- SOS, Santa Claus, or Everything Will Come True (2015)
- PARTY-ZAN Film (2016)
- Moving Up (2017)
- Our Children (2018)
- Ghouls (2019)

=== Films (actor) ===
- Occupation. Mysteries (2003, Schneider)
- Dunechka (2005, the author of the play)
- Lovey Dovey (2007, art critic)

== Plays ==
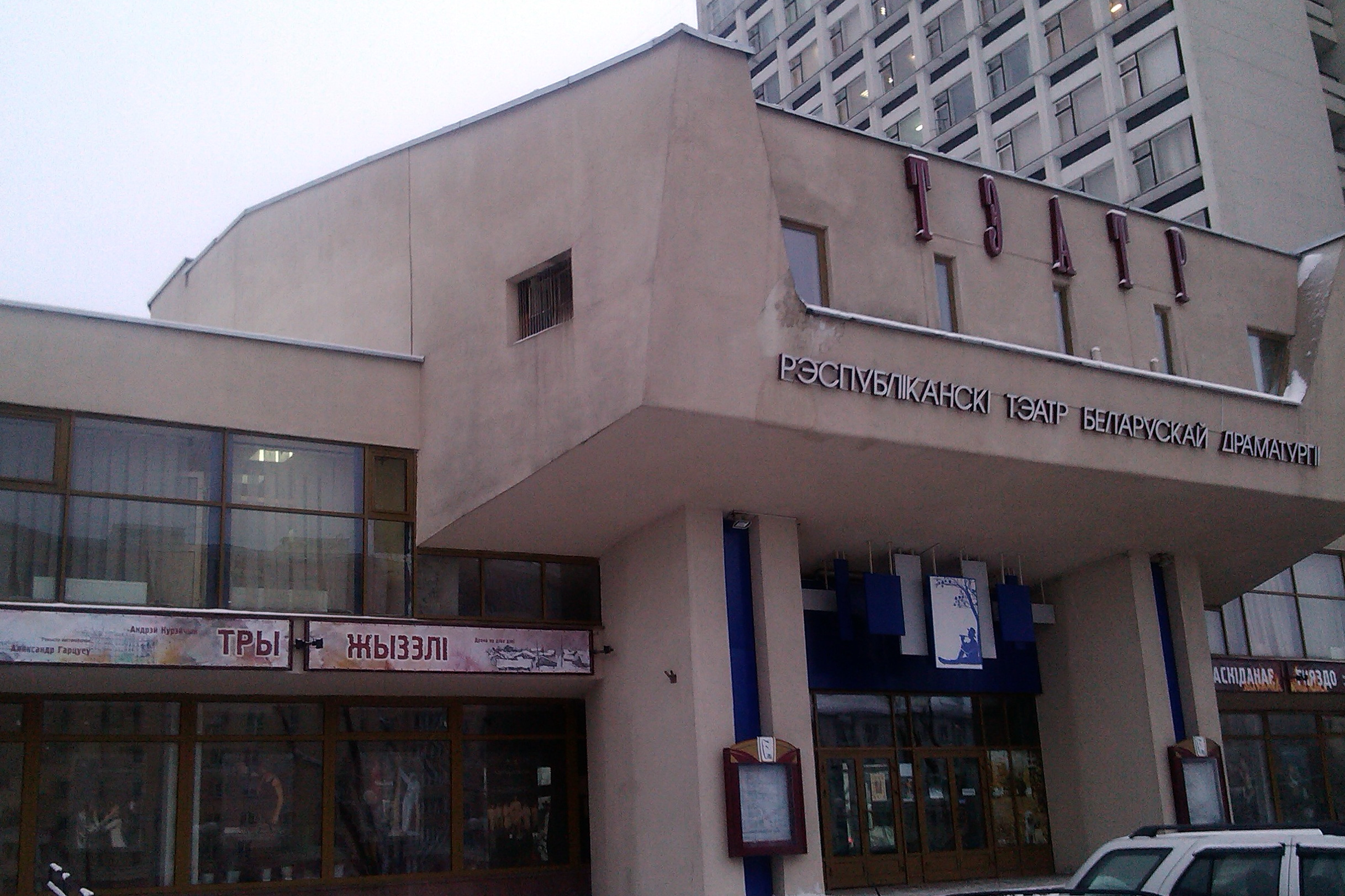
Three Giselles at the Republican Theater of Belarusian Drama. Minsk, January 2013

- Confession of Pilate (2000, staged at the Theater-Studio of the Belarusian State University)
- Piedmont Beast (2001, staged at the People's Theater in Mosty and the Yanka Kupala National Academic Theatre)
- Paradise Lost (2002, staged at the Yanka Kupala National Academic Theatre; 2003, staged at the Chekov Moscow Art Theater)
- Three Giselles (2005, staged at the New Drama Theater (Minsk); 2004, was awarded a prize at the prestigious international competition Eurasia-2004)
- Kindergarten No. ... (2011, staged at the Center for Contemporary Drama)
- How to Become Immortal (2014, staged at the Donetsk Academic Regional Russian Drama Theater, Mariupol)
- Submariners (a documentary about the events of 4 July 1961 on the Soviet nuclear submarine K-19)
- Insulted. Russia (2017, staged at the Republican Theater of Belarusian Drama; a look at the current situation in Russia and the post-Soviet space
- Beware, women!
- Muravyov. Count Amursky (2017, staged at the Khabarovsk Regional Drama Theater; a historical drama about the Governor-General of Eastern Siberia Nikolai Muravyov-Amursky)
- Bay of Happiness. Admiral Nevelskoy (2018, staged at the Khabarovsk Regional Drama Theater; a historical drama about the explorer of the Far East, Russian Admiral Gennady Nevelskoy)
- Gender Freaks (2019, staged at the Republican Theater of Belarusian Drama)
- Insulted. Belarus (2020, staged at the Kyiv Wild Theater (directed by Maksim Golenko) as part of an international project of global solidarity with the Belarusian theater; dedicated to the theme of the political crisis in Belarus after the 2020 presidential election. The prototypes are Alexander Lukashenko and his youngest son Nikolai, Svetlana Tikhonovskaya, Alexander Taraikovsky, Maria Kolesnikova and other real-life personalities. The play has been produced in over 100 venues around the world as part of the Insulted. Belarus Worldwide Readings Project.
- Voices of the New Belarus (2021, a verbatim play consisting of monologues of 15 individuals who suffered indignity, torture and/or death at the hands of Belarusian special forces during or after the 2020 revolution).
- Insulted. Planet (2023), described by the author as a "cosmic drama" that tells the tale of an attempt by international scientists to conceive and give birth in space to the first human child, as war and political intrigue beleaguer the scientists in space and on earth.
- The Empty Shell of War (2024; world premiere at Yale University in January 2025; staged at the Museum of Jewish Heritage, New York, in November 2025)
- An Ocean Away (2025; world premiere at Theatre Novi Most, Minneapolis, in October–November 2025; reading at Victory Gardens Theater, Chicago, in March 2026)
- The White Plague 2035 (2025; staged reading at Trap Door Theatre, Chicago, in April 2026)
- The Man Who Fell with the Rain (U.S. premiere production at Trap Door Theatre, Chicago, in September 2026)
- Sacrifice (2026; prologue to Insulted. USA, presented at UChicago SLIPAR in September–October 2026)

== Awards ==
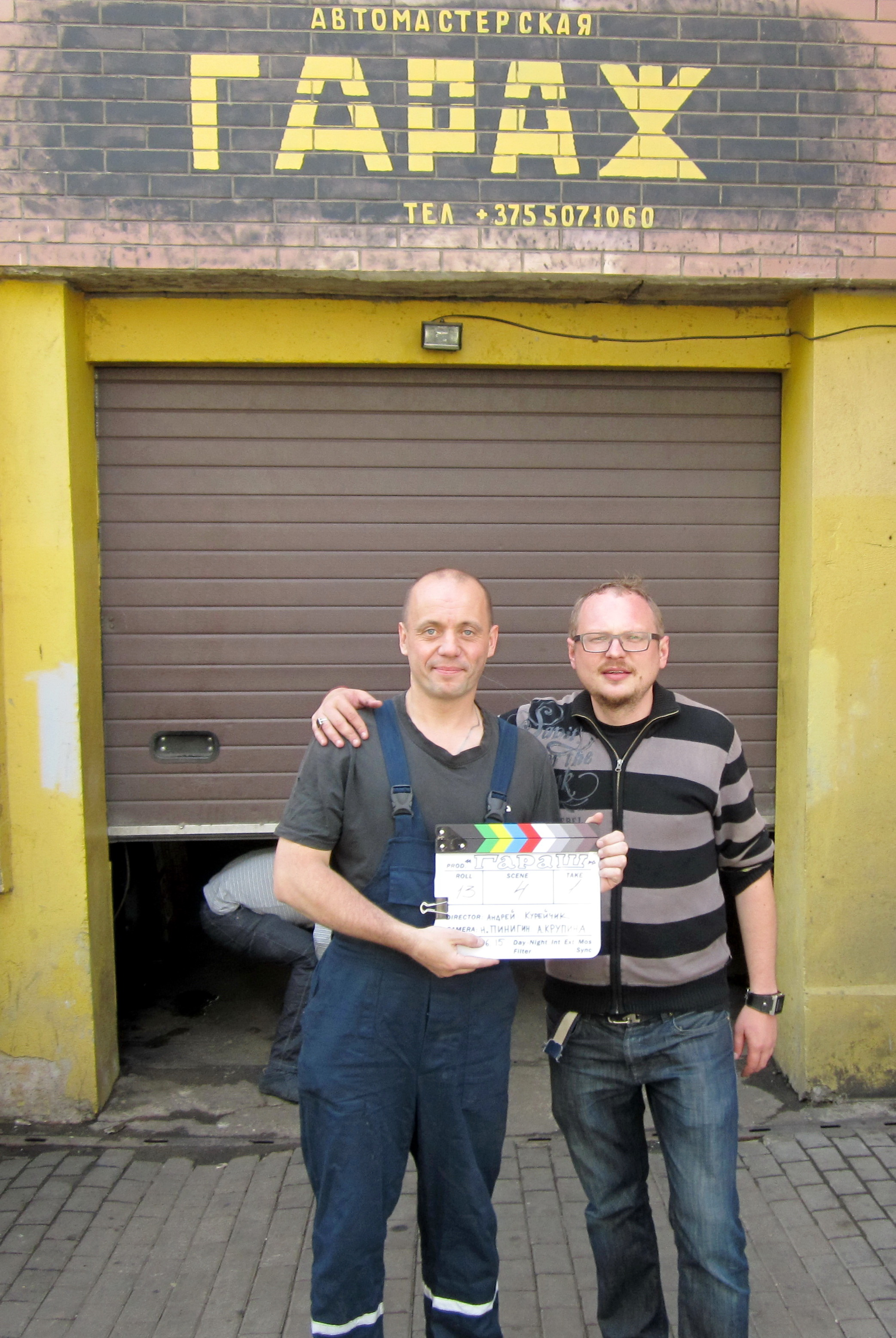
Filming of "GaraSh" movie in Belarus. Minsk, June 2015

- Piedmont Beast won the competition organized by the Ministry of Culture of Russia and the Chekov Moscow Art Theater as the best contemporary play in 2002;
- Charter of the Blind and Illusion were shortlisted for the 2002 Debut Award in the Drama category;
- Old Senor won the competition of the Ministry of Culture of Belarus as the best contemporary play in 2003;
- Paradise Lost (directed by V. Raevsky and performed by the Yanka Kupala National Academic Theatre actors) was recognized as the best production of the International Theater Festival in Chernigov (Ukraine);
- Nocturne and Kindergarten were mentioned by the jury of the 2003 Debut Literary Award;
- At the International Festival of Literature and Culture Slavic Traditions - 2011 (where Kureichik was also a member of the jury), he was awarded a diploma of the Writers' Union of Russia;
- Above the Sky received a special prize of the jury of the 2012 Russian Professional Film Production Award SHOT! (Russian: СНЯТО!) for its screenplay;
- PARTY-ZAN received a special award in the category of Cinematic Versatility at the XVIII Open Russian Comedy Film Festival (2017) Smile, Russia!;
- Moving Up was nominated for the 2019 Golden Eagle Award for the best screenplay;
- Insulted. Russia (directed by Sergei Pavlyuk) received an award for Best Director at the XII International Festival MILK (2019, Ukraine).

== Bibliography ==
- Charter of the Blind; Illusion // Childhood of the century. Prose, drama. A. Kureychik. - M .: R. Elinin Publishing House, 2003.
- Skorina: Selected plays // A. Kureychik. - Minsk: LLC "Magic Book", Ed. Varaksin AN, 2006.
