= Death of Alexander Taraikovsky =

Belarusian protester

Alexander Taraikovsky
- Born: 26 March 1986
- Died: 10 August 2020 (aged 34)
- Awards: Medal of the Order of the Pahonia

Alexander Taraikovsky (Belarusian: Аляксандр Тарайкоўскі; 26 March 1986 – 10 August 2020) was a demonstrator who died in Minsk, Belarus, during the 2020 Belarusian protests in which the police used tear gas, rubber bullets, and stun grenades against peaceful protestors. He was the first victim whose death was officially confirmed.

== Death ==
Taraikovsky died on 10 August 2020, in the capital of Belarus, Minsk, near Pushkinskaya metro station during the 2020 Belarusian protests against President Alexander Lukashenko. Taraikovsky's death was recorded as the first death since the beginning of the 2020 Belarusian protests.

The police reported that Taraikovsky died due to an explosive device detonated in his hand that he intended to throw at the officers. However, demonstrators said that he was shot by the police. A video that was published on 15 August 2020, showed Taraikovsky empty-handed being shot by the police.

On 14 August 2020, Tut.By, an independent Belarusian media outlet, reported that Taraikovsky's death certificate stated massive bleeding from an open wound in the chest as the cause of death.

On a leaked audio later on, it was said by the chief of GUBOPiK (a special police unit in Belarus) Nikolai Karpenkov that Taraikovsky was shot by the police. On February 2, 2021, Tut.By got the results of the phonoscopic analysis of the record made public by BYPOL. Talks on the killing of Taraikovsky and more are on the record. The expert test made it clear that Karpenkov's voice is on the record and there are no signs of changes made to it.

On 19 February 2021, the Investigative Committee of Belarus acknowledged that Taraikovsky had died due to a penetrating wound (as opposed to the earlier claims of an explosive device) but claimed that the security forces had used non-lethal weapons against him in accordance with the law and refused to bring a criminal case in connection with his death.

== Calls for Investigation ==
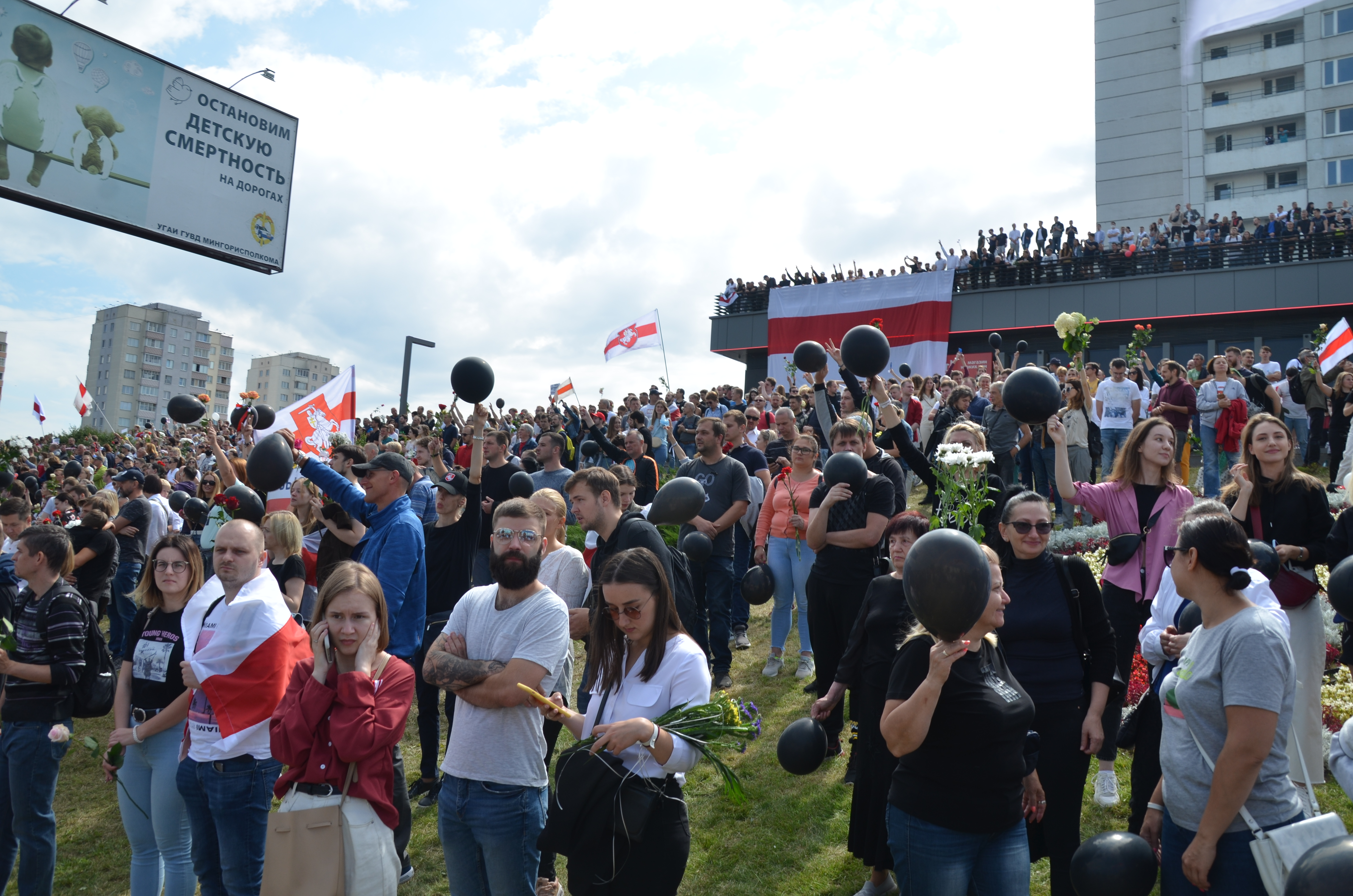
Rally in memory of Alexander Taraikovsky, Pushkinskaya metro station, Minsk, on 15 August 2020

Taraikovsky's partner, Elena German, was able to visit the morgue and see his body four days after he died. German said that she did not believe in the official version of Taraikovsky's death provided by the police. German declared that the only injury Taraikovsky had was to his chest and that his hands and feet were "completely intact." She told the Associated Press that she was sure that he was shot by the police and denied the official version that he died from an explosive device. German stated that the chest wound resembled a seam with a hole sewn up around a black bruise.

German asked the Belarusian Human Rights organization for help to facilitate an independent investigation by the international experts of Taraikovsky's death. German stated that she saw no exit wound on Taraikovsky's back. She requested to see the bullet, believing that the bullet was stuck inside Taraikovsky's body, but the police refused her request. This raised more suspicion that Taraikovsky was killed by live ammunition.

After Taraikovsky's death, video footage was published where Taraikovsky is shown standing with his hand by his body, as blood poured from his chest. He collapsed in front of a line of riot officers and remained to lay motionless. Elena German declared that there is new video footage showing Taraikovsky being shot by the police.

=== Public investigation ===
On December 21, 2020, the representative of the public initiative "Belarusian People's Tribunal" Igor Makar published the materials of the preliminary investigation. They claim that Aleksandr Taraikovsky was deliberately and cynically killed by an employee of the Special Anti-Terrorist Unit "Almaz" Korovin Nikita Yuryevich(born in 1993), with the complicity of other unidentified employees of this special forces unit.

== Funeral and memory ==
On 11 August 2020, a grassroots memorial appeared on the place of Taraikovsky's death. During the night it was destroyed by the municipal workers but reappeared the next morning. It was destroyed again and reappeared again.

On 13 August, ambassadors of European Union countries, representatives of the US embassy and other countries laid flowers to the memorial.

On 15 August, thousands of Belarusians gathered on Pushkin Square, where Taraikovsky died, to pay a tribute to him, lay flowers to the monument, and observe a moment of silence. They chanted "Tribunal” while the cars passing by were beeping in support. Pavel Latushko, director-general of Yanka Kupala National Academic Theatre, musician Lavon Volski, poet Vladimir Neklyaev, singer Max Korzh and Maria Kolesnikova, representative of former presidential candidate Viktor Babariko's headquarters, came to pay tribute to the victim.

Taraikovsky's funeral ceremony was held at the same day and was attended by around 800 people, although only relatives and friends were initially invited. When the coffin with Taraikovsky was taken out of the ceremony hall, people knelt down, clapped, showed a sign of victory and shouted 'Glory to the hero!', 'Long Live Belarus!', and then sang Magutny Bozha (Mighty God, a hymn used by the Belarusian opposition). On the same day, Alexander Taraikovsky was buried in the Western cemetery.

On 2 September, an inscription “We will not forget!” on the sidewalk near the makeshift memorial to Taraikovsky was covered with salt which prompted a spontaneous protest act. People started to swipe the salt away and put it into garbage bags disregarding the police. Vadim Zamirovski, a Tut.by photojournalist, was detained for taking pictures of what was going on. Men in civilian clothing approached him from behind, knocked him down, twisted his arms behind his back, and shoved him in a white minibus without license plates and identification signs. Half an hour later they dropped him off in the Sukharevo neighborhood. He was beaten and searched. All the memory cards were taken away. The memorial was covered with salt once more on 4 September, but people removed it again. On the night of 6 September, masked men painted over "We will not forget!".

On 9 September, two Minsk residents were detained when they were trying to restore the inscription near the memorial: a 25-year-old woman, who wrote the first word of the phrase, and a 42-year-old man. Criminal proceedings were initiated against them for hooliganism. Later, they were accused of property damage to the sum of more than 10 thousand Belarusian rubles. Still later, the charges were reclassified again as malicious hooliganism and "intentional destruction or damage to property committed in a generally dangerous manner or causing damage on a large scale”. As of October 28, both of them remained in custody in the pre-trial detention center in Zhodzina. On December 8, the woman was sentenced to one and a half years of restriction of freedom, while the man received a sentence of two years in a colony. On the same day, three more authors of the inscription in memory of Taraikovsky were sentenced; one of them received a two-year sentence in a strict regime colony.

On 17 September, Sviatlana Tsikhanouskaya’s Telegram channel announced that she was preparing "Taraikovsky's List", a separate list of officials and law enforcement officers who had participated and continue to participate in lawless actions.

In May 2021, the state utility company installed a dustbin on the former site of the makeshift memorial.

In May and August 2021, a number of people were apprehended and later fined or jailed for laying flowers near the place of Taraikovsky's death.

In March 2023, he was posthumously awarded the Medal of the Order of the Pahonia.

== Reactions ==
Journalist Vadim Shundalov left the state-run newspaper Sovetskaya Belorussiya – Belarus' Segodnya after Taraikovsky's death, saying that journalists were not allowed to report about a video contradicting the official police version of Taraikovsky death.

On 16 August 2020, then-Interior Minister Yury Karayeu renounced the initial official version, acknowledging Taraikovsky might have been killed by a rubber bullet.

On September 17, 2020, the European Parliament, in a resolution approved by an absolute majority of MPs, called for an "independent and effective investigation" into the death of Alexander Taraikovsky.

On 19 November 2020, Jim Gilmore, United States Ambassador to the Organization for Security and Cooperation in Europe, spoke on a three-month suspension of the investigation into the death of Alexander Taraikovsky that it is another sign of “the impunity with which Belarusian security forces pursue their violent crackdown on peaceful protesters.”

On 26 November 2020, the European Parliament, in its resolution adopted by an absolute majority of MPs, called for a "prompt, thorough, impartial, and independent investigation" of the killings during protests in Belarus, including Alexander Taraikovsky.

== Mass culture ==
Documentary footage of Taraikovsky's murder by law enforcement officers was used in the "Silence of the Lambs" video by Russian band Nogu Svelo!

The play Insulted. Belarus(sia) (2020) by Andrei Kureichik features the prototypes of Alexander Lukashenko and his youngest son Nikolai, Svetlana Tikhonovskaya, Alexander Taraikovsky, Maria Kolesnikova, and other real-life personalities.

== See also ==
- 2020 Belarusian protests
- List of deaths related to the 2020 Belarusian protests
- Raman Bandarenka
- Hienadz Shutau
- Аляксандар Віхор
