= Mackevičius =

Mackevičius is a Lithuanian surname, a form of the Polish surname Mackiewicz and Belarusian Matskevich. Feminine forms: Mackevičienė (married or widow), Mackevičiūtė (unmarried). Another Lithuanized form of the same surname is Mackevič.

Notable people with this surname include:

- Antanas Mackevičius (1828–1863), Lithuanian priest and rebel
- Antanina Mackevičiūtė (1926-2011), Lithuanian stage and TV actress and reciter
- Ernest Mackevičius (born 1968), Russian journalist and TV host of Lithuanian origin
