= Dmitry Krymov =

Russian artist, scenographer, teacher and theater director

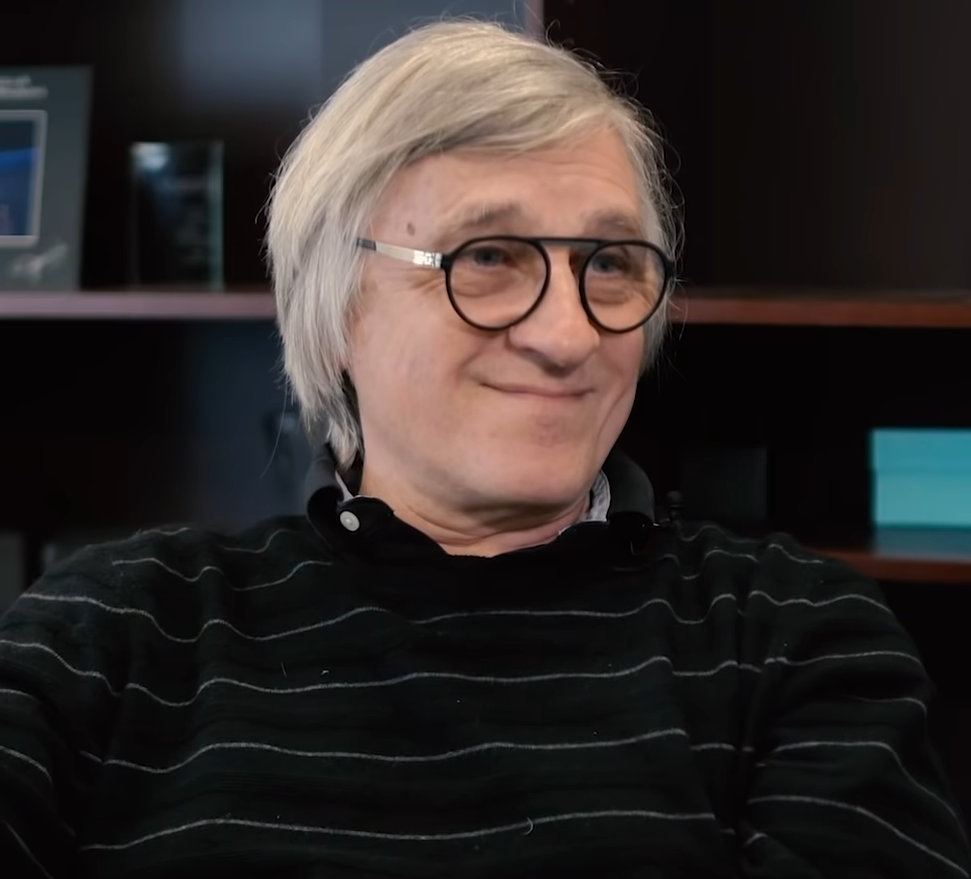
- Krymov in 2022
- Born: Dmitry Anatolyevich Krymov; October 10, 1954 (age 71); Moscow
- Education: Moscow Art Theatre School
- Parents: Anatoly Efros (father); Natalya Krymova (mother)
- Website: https://www.krymovlabnyc.com

Dmitry Anatolyevich Krymov (Russian: Дми́трий Анато́льевич Кры́мов; born 1954) is a Russian artist, scenographer, teacher and theater director, recipient of the five Golden Mask Awards.

== Biography ==
=== Family and early years ===
Dmitry was born in Moscow to Anatoly Efros and Natalya Krymova. Efros was a prominent Russian director, Krymova was a well-known critic and historian. On the advice of his paternal grandfather, Dmitry was given his mother's surname because in his time the grandfather suffered for having a Jewish surname in the USSR, where anti-Semitism was widespread. In 1976 he graduated from the Moscow Art Theatre School's scenography department.

=== Career ===
In 1976 Krymov started working as a set designer at the Malaya Bronnaya Theatre. In collaboration with his father, Dmitry staged Shakespeare's Otello, A Month in the Countryside based on Ivan Turgenev's play, Aleksei Arbuzov's Recollection, and many more. In 1985 he switched to the Taganka Theatre, where he created set design for Svetlana Alexievich's The Unwomanly Face of War, Boris Mozhayev's A Square Meter and a Half, and Molière's The Misanthrope. By the end of the 1990s, he accumulated portfolio of more than 100 plays staged in Russia and abroad.

In the 1990s, when his parents died, Krymov left the theater and dedicated himself to painting. He worked as an artist, graphic designer, and made installations. His paintings were exhibited in many countries and were bought into private and museum collections. At that time he painted the portrait of Pope John Paul II. The portrait was made from a photo and later sent as a birthday gift to the Pope. As recalled by witnesses, the cardinals in the room were shocked when the painting was revealed because it was made in a surrealistic manner reminding of Modigliani's style. However, the Pope reacted positively, saying ‘Noli timere, quia ego sum’ (‘Don’t be alarmed, it is me’).

In 2002 Krymov opened a new chapter in his career and tried himself as a teacher and a director. The Russian Institute of Theatre Arts invited him to its scenography department. At the same time he staged Hamlet with Valery Garkalin in the lead role. However, the critics reviewed the play coldly and wrote in the media that Krymov should better get back to designing and painting. In the next year, Krymov staged Nedozkasky (Not a Fairy Tale).

In 2004 Krymov joined the Moscow School of Dramatic Art where he established his own experimental Laboratory with a group of undergraduate students. Together they released ‘Donkiy Hot’ (2005), ‘Demon, Seen from Above’ (2006), Death of a Giraffe (2009), and several other plays that became widely acclaimed as a new breath in theater art, an outstanding visionary and multidisciplinary fusion of poetry, music, art and performance. In 2007 Krymov's Lab was awarded the Golden Triga for best national exhibit at the Prague Quadrennial.

In 2011 Krymov collaborated with Mikhail Baryshnikov staging Ivan Bunin's novel In Paris.

In 2016 Krymov was invited to lead a master class in Yale University. With drama department students he staged a play “The Square Root of Three Sisters”, based on Chekhov’s novel.

In 2014 Krymov signed a collective letter of Russian workers of culture that condemned the annexation of Crimea by Russia. In 2018 he was forced to leave the Moscow School of Dramatic Art due to pressure from its new director Olga Sokolova who censored his plays and removed students from his Lab. By 2018, Krymov was a multiple winner of the Golden Mask and other major theater and art awards. According to Head of Russian Director's League Valery Fokin, Krymov's dismissal from the Moscow School of Dramatic Art meant its inevitable decay.

=== Emigration ===
In Winter 2022 Krymov went to Philadelphia to work on his version of The Cherry Orchard, scheduled to premiere in February at the Wilma Theater. On February 24 he condemned the 2022 Russian invasion of Ukraine and refused to return to Russia.

On April 20, 2022, Krymov was awarded with the Golden Mask for his ‘Mozart. Don Juan. General Repetition’ staged in the Fomenko Workshop Theatre. Krymov asked his leading actor Yevgeny Tsyganov to send the Golden Mask to Novaya Gazeta’s editor-in-chief Dmitry Muratov.

In September 2022, all Krymov's plays were cancelled in Moscow theaters by order of city's Department of Culture. Only two — Boris Godunov and Two — remained, though under name of the producer. All artists like Krymov, who openly opposed the war, became victims of state censorship.

In October 2022, Krymov announced opening of his new studio Krymov Lab NYC. At first rehearsals were held in a Manhattan barbershop rented by Krymov's friend, but later the studio was invited to La MaMa. There, Krymov began work on a new project, AMERICANS: 2 Hems and 1/8 O'Neill.

In 2024, he presented his “Eugene Onegin” In Our Own Words at BRIC House in NY.

== Sources ==
- Thomas, James M. (2011-08-18). "The Visual Poetics of Dmitry Krymov's Theatre Laboratory". Contemporary Theatre Review. 21 (3): 340–350. doi:10.1080/10486801.2011.585982. S2CID 191431060.
- Kannone, Sasha (2008). "Экспериментальный Дмитрий Крымов" [Experimental Dmitry Krymov]. Direct Investments (in Russian). 08 (76).
