= Roman Kozak (theatre director) =

Russian actor and director (1957–2010)

Roman Yefimovich Kozak (Russian: Рома́н Ефи́мович Ко́зак; June 29, 1957 in Vinnytsia – May 28, 2010 in Moscow) was a Russian theatre actor and director. Honored Artist of the Russian Federation (2000). He was artistic director of the Moscow Pushkin Drama Theatre.

Roman Kozak was married to choreographer Alla Sigalova.
