= Kama Ginkas =

Russian and Soviet theatre director (born 1941)

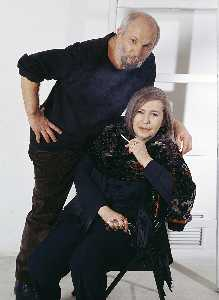
Ginkas and Yanovskaya

Kama Mironovich Ginkas (Russian: Кама Миронович Гинкас; born 7 May 1941 in Kaunas, Lithuanian SSR, USSR) is a Russian and Soviet theatre director.

== Biograрhy ==
Born into a Jewish family, Ginkas was forced by occupying German forces into the infamous Kaunas ghetto with his father Miron and mother Maria when he was still an infant. The story of his family's miraculous survival is told in detail in numerous published sources. He graduated from the Vilnius Conservatory as an actor in 1962, and from Leningrad State Institute of Theater, Music and Cinema in 1967, a student in the directing workshop of the famed Georgian-born, Soviet director Georgy Tovstonogov.

Ginkas's professional debut took place that same year in Riga, Latvia, with a production of Viktor Rozov's The Reunion. From 1970 to 1972 he was the chief director at the Young Spectator Theater in Krasnoyarsk where he staged Shakespeare's Hamlet, Ray Bradbury's Fahrenheit 451 and other works. Throughout the 1970s and first half of the 1980s Ginkas had no professional home, but collaborated with various major Russian venues, including the Moscow Art Theatre (Nina Pavlova's The Train Car and Alexander Galin's The Toastmaster), the Mossovet Theater, and the Mayakovsky Theater in Moscow, and the Theater on Liteiny in Leningrad.

Ginkas's wife Genrietta Yanovskaya was appointed chief director at the Moscow Young Spectator Theater (a.k.a. the Moscow New Generation Theater), where Ginkas had significant success with a dramatization of Fyodor Dostoyevsky's Notes from the Underground (1988). This was followed by an important decade of collaboration with theaters in Finland, where he gained his first international recognition with renderings of Ward No. 6 after Anton Chekhov (1989), Crime and Punishment (1990), The Idiot (1993) after Dostoevsky, Chekhov's The Seagull (1996), and Macbeth by Shakespeare (1997). From 1988 to the present Ginkas has worked in Moscow primarily at the Young Spectator Theater, where he has staged numerous famed, award-winning productions, including We Play "Crime" (after Dostoevsky's Crime and Punishment, 1991), K.I. from "Crime" (after segments of Crime and Punishment (1994), The Execution of the Decembrists (1995), Chekhov's The Black Monk (1999), Lady with a Lapdog (2001), and Rothschild's Fiddle (2004). In later years at the Young Spectator Theater he staged Nikolai Gogol's Notes of a Madman (2010), Adam Rapp's Nocturne (2013), Tennessee Williams' Cat on a Hot Tin Roof (2019), Samuel Beckett's Krapp's Last Tape (2021), Leo Tolstoy's Father Sergii (2022), Polina Borodina's Exodus (2022), Notes of the Late Belkin after Alexander Pushkin (2024), and many more. In the first 55 years of his career he staged some 70 productions. Many of Ginkas's productions have traveled to festivals in Germany, Italy, Belgium, Sweden, Finland, Bosnia, Brazil, United States, Poland, Croatia, the Netherlands, the former Yugoslavia, and France.

Ginkas is especially famed for his dramatic adaptations of prose by Anton Chekhov, Fyodor Dostoevsky and Alexander Pushkin. His work tends to be stark, visually stunning and unique in form, and it has earned him the highest honors in Russia and at festivals throughout the world.

In the summer of 2003, he made his American debut with his production of K.I. from "Crime", starring Oksana Mysina, at the Bard SummerScape Festival. K.I. from "Crime" was revived for a month's run off-Broadway in 2005 with the Foundry Theatre acting as presenter and producer. Ginkas's English-language adaptation of the award-winning Lady with a Lapdog marked his American English-language premiere at the American Repertory Theater in Cambridge, Massachusetts (2003). He revived the production the following year at the Guthrie Theatre in Minneapolis.

Ginkas has directed a number of productions outside of Russia, including N.F.B, an opera by Vladimir Kobekin, based on Dostoevsky's The Idiot, in Loccum, Germany (1995), and Chekhov's The Seagull in South Korea (2007). He has taught directing at the Swedish Theatre Academy in Helsinki, the Moscow Art Theatre School and Konstantin Raikin's Graduate School of Performing Arts in Moscow. He has conducted professional master classes at the Royal Shakespeare Theatre, Stratford-on-Avon; Nottingham, U.K.; Oslo, Norway; Helsinki, Finland; Toronto, Canada; Yale School of Drama, New Haven, CT; and the Paris Conservatory, France. Ginkas has been a staff director under his wife Genrietta Yanovskaya at the Moscow Young Spectator Theater (a.k.a. New Generation Theatre) since 1986.

== Awards and Prizes ==
Moscow Critics Prize, 1991

Crystal Turandot, 1995, 2001, 2010, 2014

Russian State Prize, 1999

Seagull Award, 2001, 2010

Tumanishvili Prize for Perfection in Art, 2001, 2010

Stanislavsky Prize, 2002, 2008

People's Artist of Russia, 2003

Triumph Award, 2004

Golden Mask, 2004, 2005, 2016, 2021 jointly to Ginkas and Genrietta Yanovskaya

Golden Spotlight (St. Petersburg), 2008

Tovstonogov Prize (St. Petersburg), 2008 jointly to Ginkas and Genrietta Yanovskaya

Baltic Star (St. Petersburg), 2021
