= Vyacheslav Spesivtsev =

Russian and Soviet actor and director (born 1943)

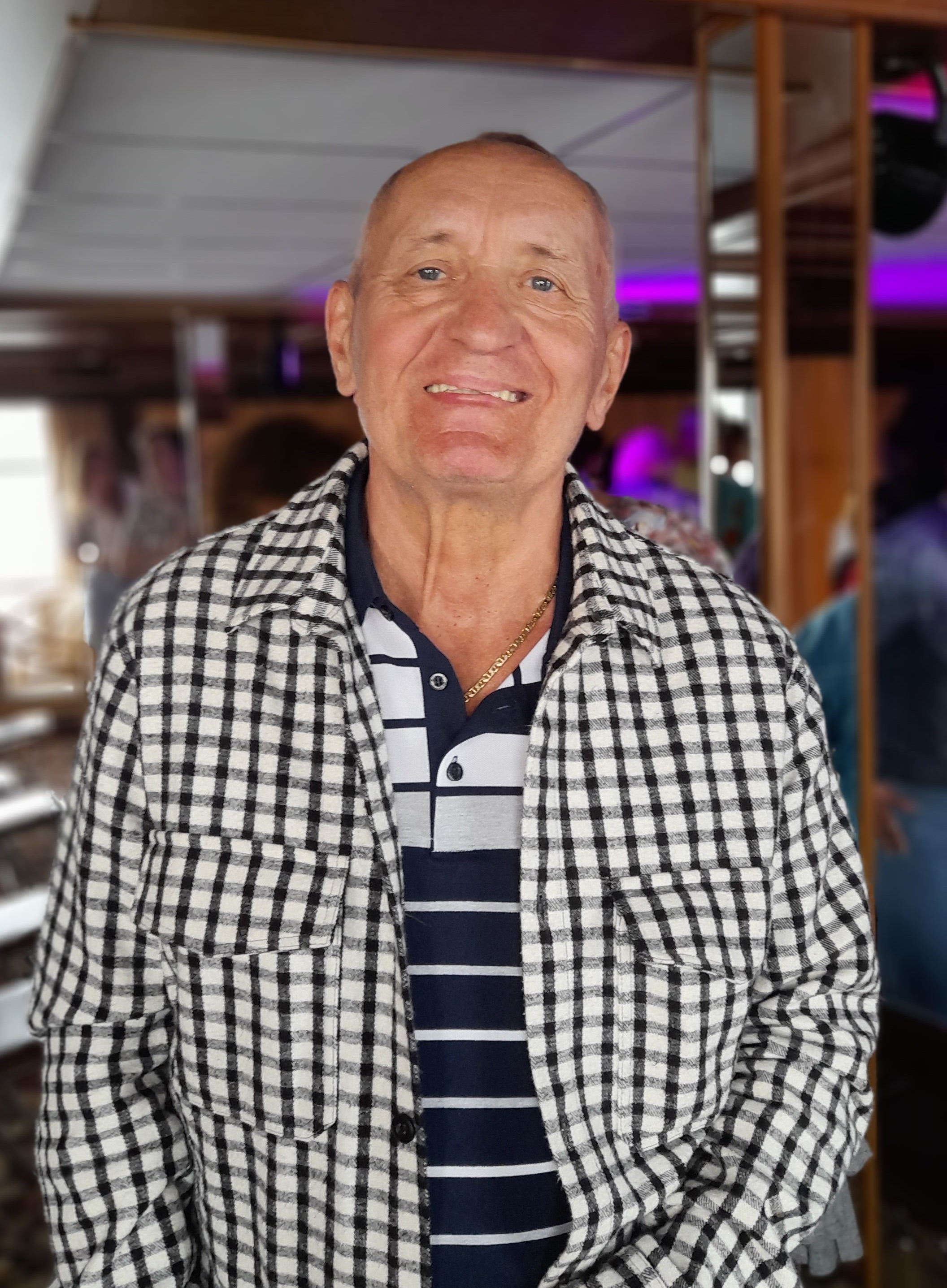
- Born: 6 February 1943 (age 83); Moscow, Soviet Union
- Occupations: actor, director, theater manager

Vyacheslav Semyonovich Spesivtsev (Russian: Вячеслав Семёнович Спесивцев; born 6 February 1943, in Moscow) is a Russian and Soviet actor and stage director. People's Artist of Russia (2010)

He graduated from the Gerasimov Institute of Cinematography. From 1966 director of the Taganka Theatre Studio in Moscow. Currently heading one of the independent theatres in Moscow.
