= John Edward Freedman =

American writer and translator (born 1954)

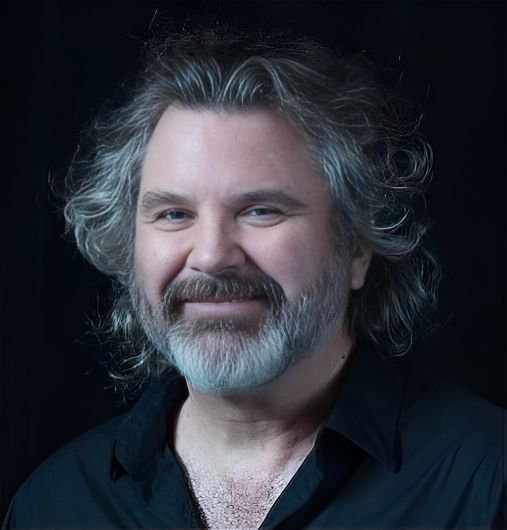
- Freedman in 2023
- Born: June 18, 1954 (age 71); Victorville, California, U.S.
- Education: University of California, Irvine (BA); George Washington University (MA); Harvard University (PhD)
- Occupations: Writer; theater critic; literary translator
- Years active: 1980–present
- Spouse: Oksana Mysina (m. 1989)

John Edward Freedman (born June 18, 1954) is an American writer, theater critic, and literary translator whose work has introduced Russian, Ukrainian, and Belarusian playwrights to a global audience. After 30 years in Moscow, he left Russia in 2018 due to the deteriorating political situation, and relocated to Greece, where he continued his literary activity and began making experimental films with his wife Oksana Mysina.

== Early life and education ==
Freedman was born in Victorville, California, and raised in the nearby cities of Apple Valley, and Claremont. He graduated from Claremont High School in 1972, received a Bachelor's Degree from the University of California, Irvine (1980), a Master's Degree from George Washington University, Washington D.C. (1982), and a PhD in Slavic Languages and Literatures from Harvard University (1990).

He played one season of minor league baseball, Class A, for the Tri-Cities Ports in Kennewick, WA in 1974.

He married Russian actress Oksana Mysina in Moscow in 1989 and they remained there until 2018.

== Career ==
In 1991 Freedman began working as a freelance theater critic for The Moscow Guardian, a twice-weekly English-language newsletter in Moscow, Russia. A year later the newsletter was rebranded as Russia's first English-language daily, The Moscow Times, for which Freedman wrote through 2015. “I found myself writing the history of contemporary Russian theatre for an English-language audience, and I began to take it seriously very quickly… A clear picture of what was happening at the time still arises out of what I wrote.”

During this period he also co-wrote, edited and translated a dozen books on the topic of Russian theater and drama - contributing more than 100 translations of dramatic works by Russian writers and more than 100 articles and essays to anthologies, books, encyclopedias, and periodicals including The New York Times, The Times Literary Supplement, American Theatre, Opera News, TheatreForum and The Stage (UK).

Other activity in this period:

- Freedman served as an editor of The Russian Theatre Archive (1995-2000, Harwood Academic Publishers);
- Freedman partnered with Philip Arnoult's Center for International Theatre Development (CITD), on the New Russian Drama: Voices in a Shifting Age project (2008-2010, Towson University) and the American Plays for Russia program (2010-2015, U.S. Embassy, Moscow);
- Freedman’s play, Dancing Not Dead, won The Internationalists 2011 Global Playwriting Contest.

In 2015 Freedman became a supervisor of English for the Stanislavsky Electrotheatre. Freedman has worked as a theater critic in Moscow.

Freedman and his wife Oksana Mysina left Moscow for Chania, Greece, in 2018, although he continued to work for the Stanislavsky Electrotheatre through 2022. "We were aware of deep-state eyes upon us at all times—they…made themselves perfectly visible when they wanted to. When Oksana began speaking out against the war in Ukraine in 2014, it had immediate repercussions on her career. Her film work dried up almost immediately and her work in theater was marginalized…. We reached a point where we realized that, by staying in Moscow, we were not only condoning the creeping madness around us, which was bad enough, but we were also letting its poison seep into us.”

== Worldwide Readings Projects ==
During the 2020-21 Belarusian protests, Freedman teamed with Belarusian playwright Andrei Kureichik to create the Insulted. Belarus Worldwide Readings Project, which – through Kureichik's plays Insulted. Belarus and Voices of the New Belarus – “had theatre artists around the world sharing the stories of the protests in Belarus and the political prisoners trapped by the regime.”

Shortly after the full-scale Russian invasion of Ukraine in 2022, Freedman "moved quickly... to bring new Ukrainian dramatic works to global audiences." He created the Worldwide Ukrainian Play Readings (WUPR) which oversaw the translation, promotion and dissemination of new works by Ukrainian playwrights internationally. Often working closely with what CITD called the Ukrainian Hope Initiative (UHI) into early 2024, WUPR helped raise money for Ukrainian writers and cultural charities, while curating the translation of 160 texts by 60 different writers, and organizing over 660 readings, productions, performances, videos, films, and installations across in over 30 countries. Arnoult and Freedman agreed to fold WUPR and UHI into a single entity shortly before Arnoult's death in June 2024. WUPR is now a project of CITD in the Linkages: Ukraine program, of which Freedman is the Project Director.

Freedman compiled and edited the anthology, A Dictionary of Emotions in a Time of War: 20 Short Works by Ukrainian Playwrights (Laertes, 2023), which placed 21st in the U.K. newspaper The Telegraph's list of the 50 best books of 2023. The book won a Bronze Medal IPPY (Independent Publisher Book awards) in the summer of 2024 in the category of Current Events (Social Issues/Humanitarian).

“The war has changed my life utterly,” Freedman said in a 2024 interview. “After over 40 years as a scholar, researcher, and translator of Russian themes, I am completely committed to Ukraine and Ukrainian drama and theater, continuing with some of my efforts in Belarusian drama.”

== Free Flight Films ==
Since relocating to Greece, Freedman and Mysina – through their Free Flight Films production company – have made a series of award-winning short and feature-length films that combine aspects of documentary and narrative film styles. Speaking of the experimental approach of Free Flight Films, Oksana Mysina noted that her films are "not for those who know for a fact that the right foot goes first, and the left follows it."

Said Freedman in 2024: “The one thing that has saved Oksana and me from going mad over these two-plus years [of war in Ukraine] is that we are making useful contributions that enable Ukraine and Ukrainians to stand their ground. Of course, our impact is minuscule when measured against the hell that Ukrainians go through every day. But we are committed to doing what we can. We put our heads down and work—hoping against hope that sooner rather than later, we will lift our heads in a legitimate, not apocalyptic, post-war scenario.”

== Books ==
=== Author ===
Provoking Theater: Kama Ginkas Directs, co-authored with Ginkas. Smith and Kraus. 2003.

Moscow Performances II: The 1996-1997 Season. Harwood Academic Publishers, 1998. (Now distributed by Routledge.)

Moscow Performances: The New Russian Theater 1991-1996. Harwood Academic Publishers, 1997. (Now distributed by Routledge).

Silence's Roar: The Life and Drama of Nikolai Erdman. Mosaic Press, 1992.

=== Editor/Translator ===
VZ: Volodymyr Zelenskyy and the Making of a Nation, translated by John Freedman. Open Letter Books, 2025.

Ghost Land, by Andriy Bondarenko. A play translated by John Freedman with Vlad Hetmanenko. Laertes Press, 2023.

Two Plays of Revolution: Insulted. Belarus and Voices of the New Belarus, by Andrei Kureichik. Compiled, edited, and translated by John Freedman. Laertes Press, 2023.

A Dictionary of Emotions in a Time of War: 20 Short Works by Ukrainian Playwrights, compiled, edited, and translated by John Freedman, with assistance from John Farndon and Nataliia Bratus. Laertes Press, 2023.

God's Gift, translation and adaptation of a Christmas poem for children by Fyodor Dostoevsky, published in a limited, non-commercial run by the Kyoto Orthodox Church in Japan, 2017.

Drillalians, an opera libretto by Boris Yukhananov, published in a dual-language book along with DVDs and CDs of the entire, five-day opera series. Stanislavsky Electrotheatre Foundation, 2016.

Real and Phantom Pains: An Anthology of New Russian Drama, compiled and edited by John Freedman. New Academia Publishers, 2014.

The Simpleton by Sergei Kokovkin. A play translated, edited and introduced by John Freedman. Harwood Academic Publishers, 1998. (Now distributed by Routledge.)

Two Plays by Olga Mukhina: Tanya-Tanya and YoU. Translated, edited and introduced by John Freedman. Harwood Academic Publishers, 1998. (Now distributed by Routledge.)

Two Plays from the New Russia. Bald/Brunet by Daniil Gink and Nijinsky by Alexei Burykin. Translated, edited and introduced by John Freedman. Harwood Academic Publishers, 1995. (Now distributed by Routledge.)

A Meeting About Laughter: Sketches, Interludes and Theatrical Parodies by Nikolai Erdman, Vladimir Mass and Others. Translated, edited and introduced by John Freedman. Harwood Academic Publishers, 1995. (Now distributed by Routledge.)

The Major Plays of Nikolai Erdman. Translated, edited and introduced by John Freedman. Harwood Academic Publishers, 1995. (Now distributed by Routledge.)
