= Maksym Kurochkin =

Ukrainian playwright

- Occupation: Playwright

Maksym Kurochkin is a contemporary Ukrainian playwright. He is involved with the Theatre of Veterans.
