= Michal Mackevič =

Lithuanian politician (born 1953)

Michal Mackevič (Polish: Michał Mackiewicz; born 1 October 1953 in Vilnius) is a Lithuanian Polish journalist, politician, president of the Association of Poles in Lithuania, and member of the Lithuanian Seimas (2008, 2012, 2016). He was also the founder and editor-in-chief of Magazyn Wileński.

In October 2010, he was awarded Officer's Cross of the Order of Merit of the Republic of Poland for the outstanding merits before Polish diaspora for the promotion of Poland and Polish traditions and culture.
