= Matskevich =

Matskevich (Belarusian: Мацкевіч) is a Belarusian surname derived from the name Maciek, a diminutive of Maciej (Matthew). Other forms include the Lithuanian Mackevičius and Polish Mackiewicz. Notable people with this surname include:

- Ivan Matskevich, Belarusian handball player
- Ivan Matskevich (actor) (b. 1947), a Soviet and Belarusian film and theater actor
- Uladzimir Matskevich (b. 1956), a Belarusian philosopher and political writer
- Vladimir Matskevich (1909–1998), a Soviet Deputy Premier
- Vladimir Matskevich (Belarus), chairman of the Belarusian State Security Committee (1995–2000)
