= Interactive design =

Specialization of design

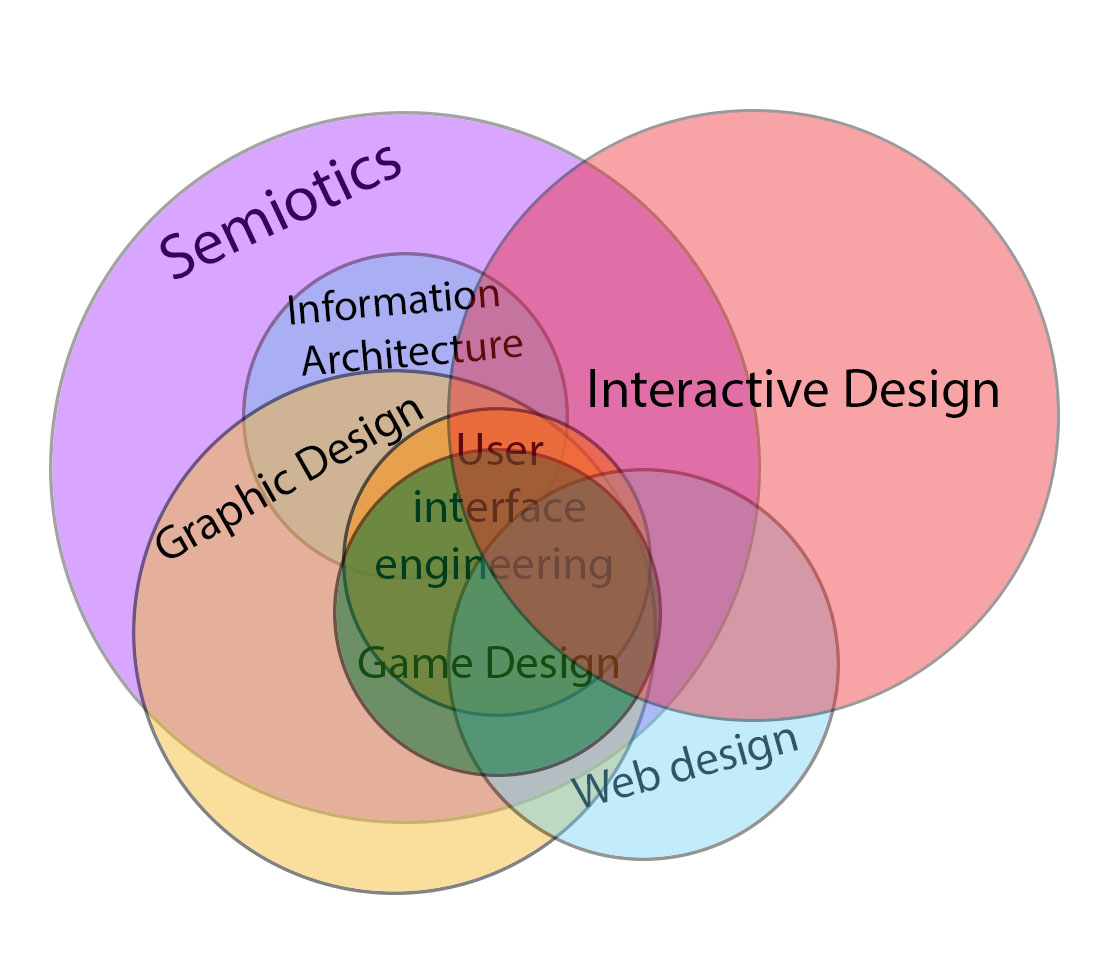
Interactive design diagram

Interactive design is a user-oriented field of study that focuses on meaningful communication using media to create products through cyclical and collaborative processes between people and technology. Successful interactive designs have simple, clearly defined goals, a strong purpose and intuitive screen interface.

== Interactive design compared to interaction design ==
In some cases interactive design is equated to interaction design; however, in the specialized study of interactive design there are defined differences. To assist in this distinction, interaction design can be thought of as:

- Making devices usable, useful, and fun, focusing on the efficiency and intuitive hardware
- A fusion of product design, computer science, and communication design
- A process of solving specific problems under a specific set of contextual circumstances
- The creation of form for the behavior of products, services, environments, and systems
- Making dialogue between technology and user invisible, i.e. reducing the limitations of communication through and with technology.
- About connecting people through various products and services,

Whereas interactive design can be thought of as:

- Giving purpose to interaction design through meaningful experiences
- Consisting of six main components including User control, Responsiveness, Real-Time Interactions, Connectedness, Personalization, and Playfulness
- Focuses on the use and experience of the software
- Retrieving and processing information through on-demand responsiveness
- Acting upon information to transform it
- The constant changing of information and media, regardless of changes in the device
- Providing interactivity through a focus on the capabilities and constraints of human cognitive processing

While both definitions indicate a strong focus on the user, the difference arises from the purposes of interactive design and interaction design. In essence interactive design involves the creation of interactive products and services, while interaction design focuses on the design of those products and services. Interaction design without interactive design provides only design concepts. Interactive design without interaction design may not built products good enough for the user.

== History ==
=== Fluxus ===
Interactive Design is heavily influenced by the Fluxus movement, which focuses on a "do-it-yourself" aesthetic, anti-commercialism and an anti-art sensibility. Fluxus is different from Dada in its richer set of aspirations. Fluxus is not a modern-art movement or an art style, rather it is a loose international organization which consists of many artists from different countries. There are 12 core ideas that form Fluxus.

1. Globalism
2. Unity of Art and Life
3. Intermedia
4. Experimentalism
5. Chance
6. Playfulness
7. Simplicity
8. Implicativeness
9. Exemplativism
10. Specificity
11. Presence in time
12. Musicality

=== Computers ===
The birth of the personal computer gave users the ability to become more interactive with what they were able to input into the machine. This was mostly due to the invention of the mouse. With an early prototype created in 1963 by Douglas Engelbart, the mouse was conceptualized as a tool to make the computer more interactive.

=== The Internet and Interactive Design ===
With the tendency of increasing use to the Internet, the advent of interactive media and computing, and eventually the emergence of digital interactive consumer products, the two cultures of design and engineering gravitated towards a common interest in flexible use and user experience. The most important characteristic of the Internet is its openness to communication between people and people. In other words, everyone can readily communicate and interact with what they want on the Internet. Recent century, the notion of interactive design started popularity with Internet environment. Stuart Moulthrop was shown interactive media by using hypertext, and made genre of hypertext fiction on the Internet. Stuart philosophies could be helpful to the hypertext improvements and media revolution with developing of the Internet. This is a short history of Hypertext. In 1945, the first concept of Hypertext had originated by Vannevar Bush as he wrote in his article As We May Think. And a computer game called Adventure was invented as responding users' needs via the first hypertextual narrative in the early 1960s. And then Douglas Engelbart and Theodor Holm Nelson who made Xanadu collaborated to make a system called FRESS in the 1970's. Their efforts brought immense political ramifications. By 1987, Computer Lib and Dream Machine were published by Microsoft Press. And Nelson joined Autodesk, which announced plans to support Xanadu as a commercial. The definition of Xanadu is a project that has declared an improvement over the World Wide Web, with mission statement that today's popular software simulates paper. The World Wide Web trivializes our original hypertext model with one-way ever-breaking links and no management of version or contents. In the late 1980s, Apple computer began giving away Hypercard. Hypercard is relatively cheap and simple to operate. In the early 1990s, the hypertext concept has finally received some attention from humanist academics. We can see the acceptance through Jay David Bolters ' Writing Space (1991)', and George Landow's Hypertext.

=== Advertising ===
Upon the transition from analogue to digital technology, one sees a further transition from digital technology to interactive media in advertising agencies. This transition caused many of the agencies to reexamine their business and try to stay ahead of the curve. Although it is a challenging transition, the creative potential of interactive design lies in combining almost all forms of media and information delivery: text, images, film, video and sound, and that in turn negates many boundaries for advertising agencies, making it a creative haven.

Hence, with this constant motion forward, agencies such as R/GA have established a routine to keep up. Founded in 1977 by Richard and Robert Greenberg, the company has reconstructed its business model every nine years. Starting from computer-assisted animation camera, it is now an "Agency for the Digital World". Robert Greenberg explains: "the process of changing models is painful because you have to be ready to move on from the things that you're good at". This is one example of how to adapt to such a fast-paced industry, and one major conference that stays on top of things is the How Interactive Design Conference, which helps designers make the leap towards the digital age.

=== Interactive new media art ===
Nowadays, following the development of science and technology, various new media appear in different areas, like art, industry and science. Most technologies described as "new media" are digital, often having characteristics of being manipulated, networkable, dense, compressible, and interactive (like the internet, video games and mobiles). In the industry field, companies no longer focus on products itself, they focus more on human-centered design. Therefore, "interactive" become an important element in the new media. Interactivity is not only computer and video signal presenting with each other, but it should be more referred to communication and respondence among viewers and works.

According to Selnow's (1988) theory, interactivity has three levels:

1. Communicative Recognition: This communication is specific to the partner. Feedback is based on recognition of the partner. When a learner inputs information into a computer and the computer responds specifically to that input, there is mutual recognition. The menu format allows mutual recognition.
2. Feedback: The responses are based on previous feedback. As the communication continues, the feedback progresses to reflect understanding. When a learner refines a search query and the computer responds with a refined list, message exchange is progressing.
3. Information Flow: There is an opportunity for a two-way flow of information. It is necessary both the learner and the computer have means of exchanging information. The search engine tool allows for learner input via use of the keyboard and the computer responds with written information.

New media has been described as the "mixture between existing cultural conventions and the conventions of software. For instance newspapers and television, they have been produced from traditional outlets to forms of interactive multimedia." New media can allow audiences access to content anytime, anywhere, on any digital device. It also promotes interactive feedback, participation, and community creation around the media content.

New media is a vague term to mean a whole slew of things. The Internet and social media are both forms of new media. Any type of technology that enables digital interactivity is a form of new media. Video games, as well as Facebook, would be a great example of a type of new media. New media art is simply art that utilizes these new media technologies, such as digital art, computer graphics, computer animation, virtual art, Internet art, and interactive art. New media art is very focused on the interactivity between the artist and the spectator.

Many new media art works, such as Jonah Brucker-Cohen and Katherine Moriwaki's UMBRELLA.net and Golan Levin et al.'s Dialtones: A Telesymphony, involve audience participation. Other works of new media art require audience members to interact with the work but not to participate in its production. In interactive new media art, the work responds to audience input but is not altered by it. Audience members may click on a screen to navigate through a web of linked pages, or activate motion sensors that trigger computer programs, but their actions leave no trace on the work itself. Each member of the audience experiences the piece differently based on the choices he or she makes as while interacting with the work. In Olia Lialina's My Boyfriend Came Back From The War, for example, visitors click through a series of frames on a Web page to reveal images and fragments of text. Although the elements of the story never change, the way the story unfolds is determined by each visitor's own actions.
