= Soviet parallel cinema =

Underground film movement in the Soviet Union

- Years: 1970–1990
- Country: Russia
- Key Locations: Moscow, Saint Petersburg
- Founders: Evgenii Iufit, Boris Yukhananov, Gleb Aleinikov, Igor Aleinikov
- Famous Publications: Cine-Fantom
- Ideologies: Social Realism and Necro-realism

Soviet parallel cinema is a genre of film and underground cinematic movement that occurred in the Soviet Union in the 1970s onwards. The term parallel cinema (known in Russian as параллельное кино, parallel'noe kino) was first associated with the samizdat films made out of the official Soviet state system. Films from the parallel movement are considered to be avant-garde, non-conventionalist and cinematographically subversive.

The two main groups and founders of the parallel cinema movement are Evgenii Iufit and the Necrorealists in Leningrad (now known as Saint Petersburg), and the circle of Aleinikov brothers in Moscow. These two groups achieved phenomenal fame in Russia in the 1980s – and during the dissolution of the Soviet Union – for their involvement in the parallel cinema movement and "late socialism".

== Overview ==
=== Origin ===
Soviet parallel cinema is an offshoot of the film movement that overrun the 1960s and 1970s in India called New Indian Cinema – alternatively known as Indian New Wave or parallel cinema. Similarly to its Soviet counterpart, it maintained a focus on offbeat productions that dealt with real world representations of society including socio-cultural and political contexts. It was strongly espoused by the themes, methods and workings of Neorealism.

The introduction of parallel cinema is derived from amateur film studios and workshops that were prevalent in Soviet culture at the time. During 1957, the Soviet state system formed a funding to provide support for professional filmmakers and subsequently for amateur film workshops. This enforced the states regulation and control on ideological distribution on the industry. The Soviet state established two systems for filmmaking: the first controlled professional cinema or State Committee for Cinematography called Goskino, and amateur film studios. Films produced outside of these official systems are classified in the world of "parallel cinema". The films produced in this era were out of the state's control and as such, prohibited. Parallel cinematographers, such as Evgenii Iufit and the Aleinikov Brothers, utilised the studio facilities of amateur film clubs and workshops to produce their films. The Leningrad amateur film club - used by Evgenii Iufit and more – still exists under the name the St. Petersburg Club of Film and Video Amateurs. As the political controls diminished in the 1980s with the shifts of power, the amateur film workshops were overrun with parallel cinema production. The parallel movement marks the first large influx of creative expression in Soviet culture since post-Russian Revolution in the 1920s.

=== Background ===
Films of the Soviet parallel cinema movement is classified under the umbrella of renegade self-published art and literature of the Soviet State called samizdat. Samizdat was deemed forbidden and unavailable for distribution due to is rebellious ideals and alternative ideologies to the Soviet Union. All forms of samizdat displayed defiance to the government-regulated distributed content as it embodied political opposition and an open discourse that aimed to deconstruct the Soviet Empire. In the term's broadness, parallel cinema, or parallel'noe kino, is also described as cinematic samizdat.

The parallel cinema movement in Soviet states was accompanied by the introduction of a samizdat cinematic journal called Cine-Fantom. Cine-Fantom was founded by Gleb Aleinikov and Igor Aleinikov (known as Aleinikov brothers) in the 1980s. Cine-Fantom has since stood as a film festival, meeting house and currently as a theatre. The Cine-Fantom was a hand-made art journal that was devoted to the publishing the issues and developments of cinema – particularly in relation to parallel cinema. The journal was originally created and published only for friends of the two brothers, however, it gained popularity in the latter part of the 1980s circulating widely across Russia. It became well known for its trademark blue cover. The journal was the first to establish the changes in Soviet cinema with the term "parallel cinema" as it appeared in an issue having been taken from the encyclopedia. During the Soviet Parallel cinema movement, filmmakers began producing films independent from the official Soviet production system. Hence, Cine-Fantom was a centre-point for these filmmakers and the avant-garde film industry.

While the state defined production of art was ground on the doctrine of social-realism, the parallel cinema movement challenged the construction with a subversive potency. The two most infamous groups and founders of the parallel cinema movement are Evgenii Iufit and the Necrorealists in Leningrad, and the circle of Aleinikov brothers in Moscow. Evgenii Iufit founded the cult sub-genre called necrorealism, that was adopted by followers of the movement throughout Leningrad. Necrorealism is understood as parody of social-realism. Through the wordplay and pun, the term implies that the reality of the regime was death. This term also signalled the anticipation to the end of the radicalism Russian Social Democratic Labor Party, or the Bolsheviks. Films adopting this ideology primarily focus on dark themes, black humour, monochromatic images and notions of the absurd. The necrorealists focused on challenging the ways death was represented throughout Soviet culture, specifically through the taboo aspects such as extreme violence, suicide or body decomposition. At the time, Leningrad hosted a multitude of underground groups with the necrorealists being the most infamous and prevalent. The necrorealists were established outside the amateur film movement, however, were not completely detached from it as individual filmmakers created their films at trade union studios and Leningrad amateur film club.

== Historical significance ==
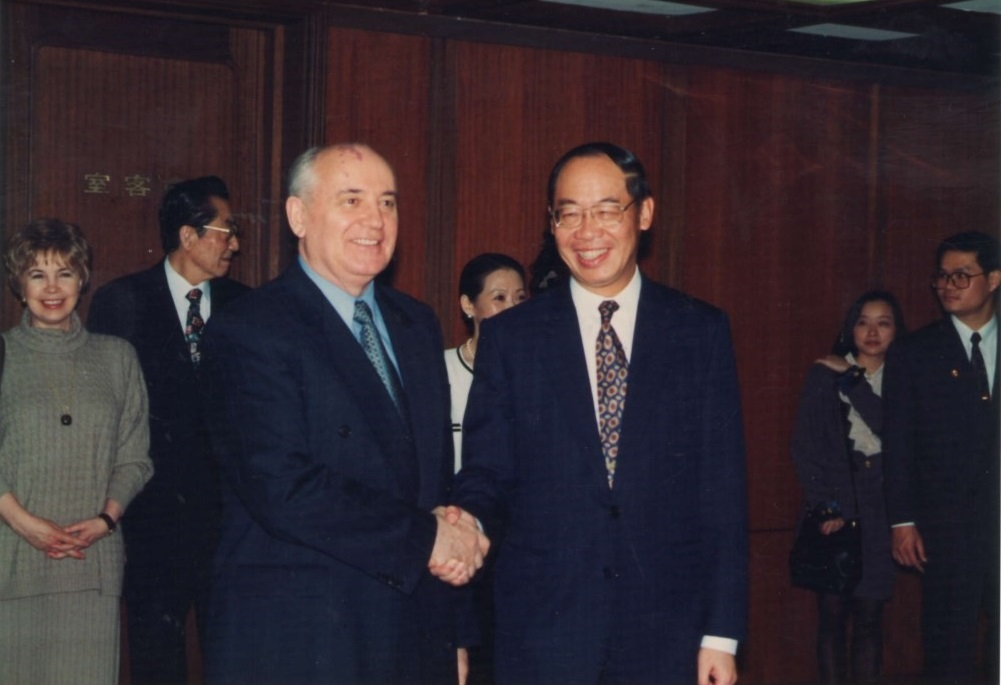
Mikhail Gorbachev in 1994

In the early 1980s and prior, official filmmaking was under the control of the Soviet regime while the parallel cinema world remained underground. Goskino – the state studio – monopolised the control, regulation and censorship on the industry and film production. This committee were culminated to deem what images were appropriate and acceptable for the people in terms of political and social ideologies. As such, at this stage Soviet parallel cinema remained an unofficial and underground renegade film club that challenged the constraints of the official system.

Soviet parallel cinema emerged from underground to the surface naturally during the shift in political power and historical changes – specifically during perestroika in the mid-1980s. The reforms of this program allowed the compression of artistic expression to lessen and the underground to surface. Furthermore, the political shifts rendered state bureaucracy inefficient to control the mass of institutions and enforce policies. The leniency in the states control fostered the movement of the underground world of parallel cinema into openness. In this time, the control of enforcers such as the KGB diluted and as such, trends in culture and art emerged. Parallel cinema quickly became the forefront of cinematic production. As well as this, the Gorbachev era marks a shift in the nature of the movement. Prior to the reform, the artists were suppressed, fighting and dissenting in the form of Soviet parallel film. The lessened control allowed the movement to shift from a rebellion to independent filmmaking.

== Key figures ==
=== Evgenii Iufit ===
Evgenii Iufit (also transliterated as Yevgeny Yufit) was a Russian artist and filmmaker known for founding necrorealism – a driving ideology of parallel cinema. He was born in 1961 in Saint Petersburg and stated his career in the film industry by the early 1980s. He died on 13 December 2016. Iufit developed his interest in art and cinema as a student at the Leningrad technical institute. Due to the overarching control by the state's cinema organisation, Goskino, he founded the alternative style of necro-realism in the underground movement. Iufit's scope of art included paintings, photography and films.

Iufit's avant-garde parallel films are thematically characterised by homoeroticism and the hybridisation of black humour and slapstick comedy. In early 1986 – the beginning of perestroika – he founded the first independent art-house film studios in Soviet Russia called "The Mzhalala Film". The production company focussed on the production of experimental shorts from artists, writers and directors that practiced the radical aesthetics of parallel cinema. His films include Sawyer (1984), Spring (1987), Courage (1988), and Boar Suicide (1988).

=== Gleb Aleinikov and Igor Aleinikov ===
Gleb Aleinikov and younger brother Igor Aleinikov (known as Aleinikov brothers) are renowned Russian screenwriters, film directors and film theorists. Alongside Evgenii Iufit, the brothers are founders and prolific figures of the parallel cinema movement in the Soviet Union. Prior to their shift into the film industry, Gleb Aleinikov completed his studies at the Moscow Institute of Construction Engineering in 1988 and Igor at the Moscow Institute of Engineering and Physics in 1984. During this period of study, the brothers founded, promoted and developed the underground Parallel cinema movement.

In the mid-1980s, alongside Boris Yukhananov, the brothers formed the cinematic samizdat, Cine-Fantom, and acted as primary editors from 1985 to 1990. The Aleinikov brothers' films are subversive and provocative – as per the nature of the parallel movement – as a means of attacking the constraints of the mainstream state-run Soviet system. Igor Aleinikov died in a plane crash in March 1994. After his death, Gleb Aleinikov published his late brothers' diaries in 1999 which consisted of film ideas, plans, and anecdotes of the underground movement. Gleb Aleinikov currently runs the second largest TV station in Russian.

Some of their films include The Cruel Illness of Males (1987), Awaiting de Bil (1990), Tractor Drivers II (1992) – which was their only feature-length film – M.E (1986), Tractors (1987) and Boris and Gleb (1988).

=== Boris Yukhananov ===
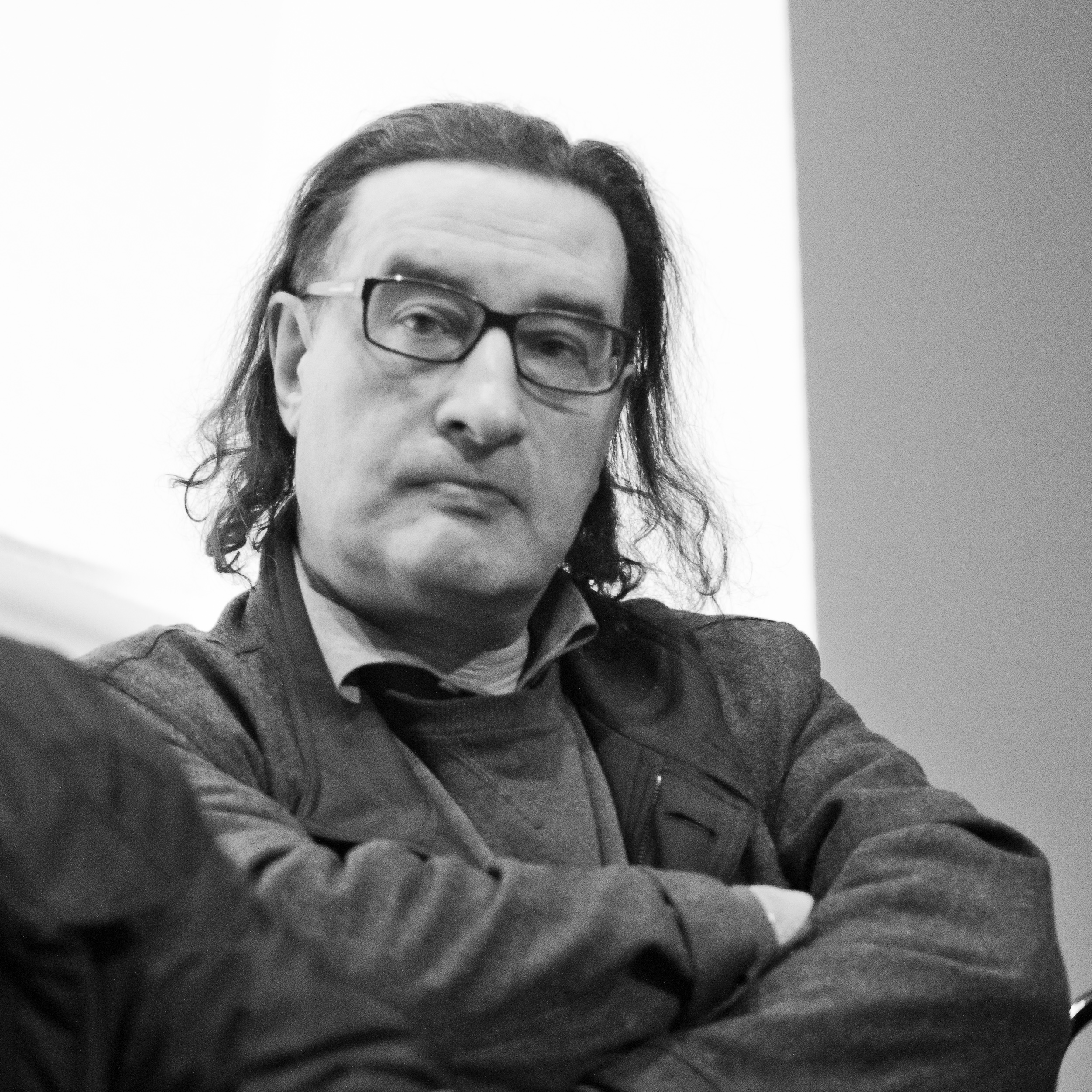
Boris Yukhananov

Boris Yukhananov is a prominent Russian director, educator and theorist most well known as a founding figure and strong contributor to the Soviet Parallel cinema movement. He contributed a broad range of art – including cinema, photography, theatre and written. Alongside the Brothers Aleinikov, Yukhananov stood outside the constraints of Soviet forces contributing greatly to the samizdat Cine-Fantom. He joined the Cine-Fantom on the editorial board as well as writing theoretical articles about video and art.

In 1986 he formed the very popular video novel The Mad Prince.The Mad Prince was a cycle of films shot with the sole known VHS camera in Moscow and Leningrad. From the material, five one-hour long films have been edited. This is a key collection of films that embodied the notions of the parallel cinema movement. Yukhanov's films are immersed in the context of the renegade "youth culture" that developed throughout the underground at the time. Through The Mad Prince, Yukhananov innovated fatal editing. This concept of fatal editing (known as fatal'nyi montazh) was highly used in the production of parallel films throughout the era. This is a montage technique that irreversibly replaced old shots with new ones due to the functions of video cameras.

== List of notable films ==
- Sawyer (1984)
- Metastases (1984)
- Werewolf Paramedics (1984)
- The Mad Prince (1986)
- M.E (1986)
- A Revolutionary Sketch (1987)
- Tractors (1987)
- I'm Cold, So What?/ I'm Frigid but it Doesn't Matter (1987)
- The Severe Illness of Men (1987)
- Supporter of Olf (1987)
- Spring (1987)
- Boris and Gleb (1988)
- Courage (1988)
- Boar Suicide (1988)
- Dreams (1988)
- Postpolitical Cinema (1988)
- Someone Has Been Here (1989)
- War and Peace (1989)
- Awaiting de Bil (1990)
- Tractor Drivers II (1992)
- The Wooden Room (1995)

== Identifying characteristics ==
=== Cinematography ===
The parallel movement directed filmmakers into a regressive and rebellious mode of cinematography that refuted traditional conventions. After the long run of conservatism as a result of social realism, parallel films marked a shift into the more experimental and free stylistic filmmaking, much like films post-Russian Revolution in the 1920s. Due to the lack of money and underground nature of the production, filmmakers improvised by using crude equipment and the expression of the physical human body to create meaning in their films. They produced cheap 8mm and 16mm shorts that were in violation of the technical standards and rules of cinematic narration permitted by the government regime. The unity in their means and motivations formed this new genre and age in Soviet film.

Films of this era exhibit experimental and obscure forms of montage that do not abide by the state-approved regulations that were placed on all aspects of filmmaking. In official Goskino productions, montage was replaced by a representational style that adhered to the official Soviet policy that artistic quality is derived from its content. While bureaucratic pressure drove out experimental montage style, parallel filmmakers re-adopted autonomous and rebelliousness. The films of this movement had a primitive, low-budget style that acted as a documentation of times rather than a narrative film. They feature sporadic cuts, non-linearity, lack of narrative and Boris Yukhananov's fatal editing.

=== Themes and motifs ===
There is no singular overarching theme to parallel cinema other than they embody the notions of anti-establishment. The genre was defined by the stark subversion from the Russian films of the state-approved socialist realism imagery. Through the collapse of the Soviet Union and the threat of authority – such as the KGB – diminished, the filmmakers unleashed the repressed creativity resulting in films depicting alcohol, profanity, violence and surrealism. In their rebellion, filmmakers of the time aimed to depict the harsh truth of the Soviet lifestyle, social landscape and political context. The directors and films of the times were united by the sense of aesthetic revenge that overpowered the movements productions.

Soviet parallel films explore notions of sexuality, parody, death and anti-utopia in the perestroika era. As filmmakers worked underground and skirted around existing Soviet regulation or censorship, their films included social satire, cynical commentary on Soviet life and fantasy elements. The depiction of such things was an implicit affront to state-approved imagery and Soviet conventions. Film of the era are categorised as dark, profane and confronting – commonly compared to those of film noir. The films derived from the parallel cinema era embody the Russian concept of "chernukha" (roughly "black stuff"). Chernukha is a perestroika phenomenon of the late 1980s that describe the tendency toward unrelenting pessimism in arts and mass media. Through vivid depictions of prostitutes and gangsters, this film ideology represented graphic violence and misery in Soviet life. While the motif of death and destruction carried throughout the movement, the necro-realist Parallel filmmakers – such as Evgenii Iufit – particularly focussed on exploring the liminal state between life and death. The films featured apocalyptic landscapes with zombies committing excessive cruelty, murder, sex and homosexual violence. Homoeroticism played a large role in the films produced. As well as this, many films featured a dystopian world of un-human creatures committing heinous acts as a means of showing a Soviet reality.

== See also ==
- Cinema of the Soviet Union
- Parallel cinema
- Film genre
- Dissolution of Soviet Union
- Yevgenii Yufit
- Boris Yukhananov
- Social realism
- Perestroika
- Postmodernist film
- Samizdat

== Bibliography ==
1. ACLA. 2021. New Perspectives on the Indian New Wave: Fifty Years On. https://www.acla.org/new-perspectives-indian-new-wave-fifty-years-i.
2. Art Forum. 2016. Eugene Yufit (1961–2016) . https://www.artforum.com/news/eugene-yufit-1961-2016-65640.
3. Berry, Ellen E., and Anesa Miller-Pogacar. 1996. "A Shock Therapy of the Social Consciousness: The Nature and Cultural Function of Russian Necrorealism." Cultural Critique (University of Minnesota Press) 34: 185–203.
4. Beumers, Brigit, and Eugénie Zvonkine. 2017. "Introduction: Re-construction, or perestroika Re-visioning, re-making, re-framing." In Ruptures and Continuities in Soviet/Russian Cinema, by Brigit Beumers and Eugénie Zvonkine, 1–11. London: Routledge.
5. Bordwell, David. 1972. "The Idea of Montage in Soviet Art and Film." Cinema Journal 11 (2): 9–17.
6. Boym, Svetlana. 1995. "Post-Soviet Cinematic Nostalgia: From "Elite Cinema" to Soap Opera." Discourse 17 (3): 75-84.
7. Brashinski, Michael, and Andrew Horton. 1996. "Russian Critics on the Cinema of Glasnost." Film Quarterly 49 (4): 58–59.
8. Britannica. 2020. Perestroika. https://www.britannica.com/topic/perestroika-Soviet-government-policy.
9. EEFB. 2020. Editorial. https://eefb.org/volumes/vol-109-november-2020/editorial-109/.
10. Gooding, John. 1992. "Perestroika as Revolution from within: An Interpretation." The Russian Review 51 (1): 36–57.
11. Hansgen, Sabine. 2019. "The Repetition of History." In Performance Cinema Sound Perspectives and Retrospectives in Central and Eastern Europe, by Alfrun Kliems, Tomas Glanc and Zornitza Kazalarska, 67–78.
12. Iles, Andrew. 2003. "Necrorealism: a Russian death experience." BMJ. 327.
13. Ioffe, Dennis, and Eugenie Zvonkine. 2014. Russian pathographical cinema: the films of Evgenii Iufit. https://lib.ugent.be/en/catalog/pug01:5782871.
14. Isakava, Volha. 2017. "Reality excess Chernukha cinema in the late 1980s." In Ruptures and Continuities in Soviet/Russian Cinema, by Brigit Beumers and Eugénie Zvonkine, 147–165. London: Routledge. https://www.encyclopedia.com/history/encyclopedias-almanacs-transcripts-and-maps/chernukha.
15. Kepley, Vance. 1996. "The First "Perestroika": Soviet Cinema under the First Five-Year Plan." Cinema Journal (University of Texas Press) 35 (4): 31-53 .
16. Komaromi, Ann. 2004. "The Material Existence of Soviet Samizdat." Slavic Review (Cambridge University Press) 63 (3): 597–618.
17. Law, Alma (1990). "Red Fish in America". Soviet and East European Performance. 10 (2): 41–42.
18. Moller, Olaf. 2007. "Return of the Living Dead." Film Comment 43 (1): 13–14.
19. Petrik, Gordei. 2020. Your Head in Your Hands. https://eefb.org/retrospectives/boris-yukhananovs-video-novel-the-mad-prince-sumashedshiy-prints-1986/.
20. Rojavin, Marina, and Tim Harte. 2021. "Introduction." In Soviet Films of the 1970s and Early 1980s Conformity and Non-Conformity Amidst Stagnation Decay, by Marina Rojavin and Tim Harte. London and New York: Routledge.
21. Rollberg, Peter. 2016. "The Dictionary." In Historical Dictionary of Russian and Soviet Cinema, by Peter Rollberg, 36–37. Rowman and Littlefield.
22. Shterianova, Magdalena. 2020. Interview with Boris Yukhananov. https://eefb.org/country/russia/interview-with-boris-yukhananov/.
23. VBS Staff. 2010. 'Bizarre' Russian film genre born of decades of creative suppression. http://edition.cnn.com/2010/WORLD/europe/04/13/vbs.russian.parallel.cinema/index.html.
24. VICE Staff. 2010. Russian Parallel Cinema. [https://www.vice.com/en/article/russian-parallel-cinema-part-1-of-3/ Vice.com].
25. Vinogradova, Maria. 2012. "Between the state and the kino: Amateur film workshops in the Soviet Union." Studies in European Cinema (Routledge) 8 (3): 211–225.
26. Vinogradova, Maria. 2016. "Scientists, punks, engineers and gurus: Soviet experimental film culture in the 1960s–1980s." Studies in Eastern European Cinema 7 (1): 39–52.
27. Westwell, Guy, and Annette Kuhn. 2020. A Dictionary of Film Studies$ A Dictionary of Film Studies. https://www.oxfordreference.com/view/10.1093/acref/9780198832096.001.0001/acref-9780198832096-e-0476.
28. Yukhananov, Boris. 1989. Fatal Montage. February . https://borisyukhananov.com/archive/item.htm?id=12532.
29. Yukhananov, Boris. 2017. "Perestroika and Parallel Cinema." In Ruptures and Continuities in Soviet/Russian Cinema, by Boris Yukhananov and Brigit Beumers. Routledge.
30. Yurchak, Alexei. 2008. "Suspending the Political: Late Soviet Artistic Experiments on the Margins of the State." Poetics Today 29 (4): 713–733.
