= Electrotheatre Stanislavsky =

Stanislavsky Electrotheatre
- Stanislavsky Drama Theatre, Stanislavsky Opera and Drama Theatre
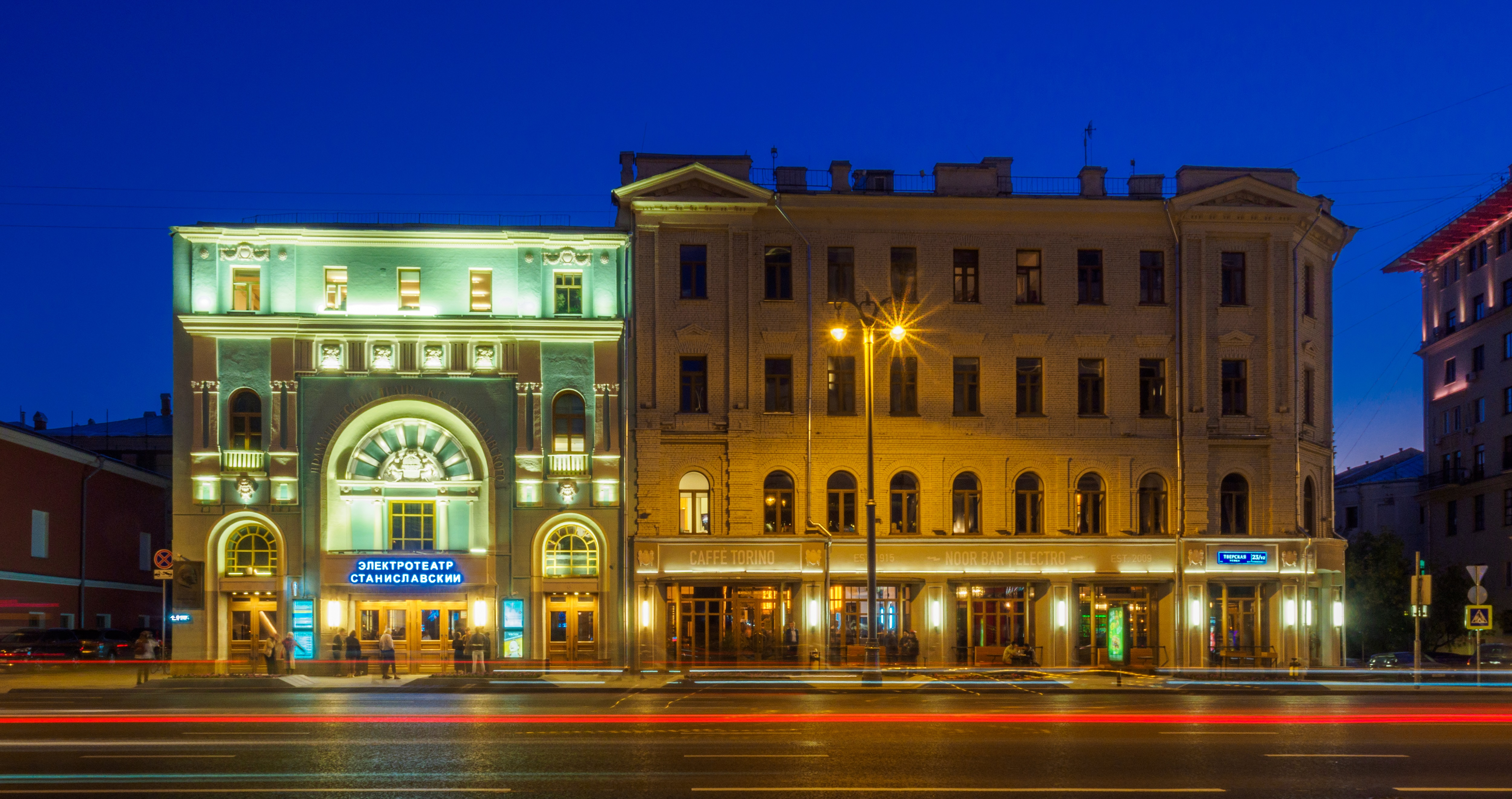
- Interactive map of Stanislavsky Electrotheatre
- Address: Tverskaya Street 23; Moscow; Russia
- Public transit: Tverskaya (Moscow Metro), Pushkinskaya (Moscow Metro), Chekhovskaya (Moscow Metro)

Construction
- Opened: 19

Website
- electrotheatre.com

The Stanislavsky Electrotheatre (Russian: Электротеатр Станиславский), known from 1948 to 2013 as the Stanislavsky Drama Theatre, and from 1946 to 1948 as the Stanislavsky Opera and Drama Theatre, is a theatre in Moscow. It was founded in 1935 as an opera and drama studio. It has functioned as a drama theatre since 1948. Since 1950 it has been located at 23 Tverskaya Street. In 2013, it was closed for renovations and in 2015 was reopened under its current name. It has been a member of the Union of the Theatres of Europe since 2017. The theatre's artistic director is Boris Yukhananov.

== History ==
=== Beginnings ===
The artistic history of the building occupied by the Stanislavsky Electrotheatre on Tverskaya Street began in 1915, when apartment building No. 23 was converted into a cinema hall known as the Ars electrotheatre (“Ars” being the Latin word for “art”). In the summer of 1921 the former cinema was turned over to the Moscow Theatre for Children under the direction of Natalia Sats. It became the home of the Moscow Young Spectator Theatre in 1932.

Konstantin Stanislavsky established an opera and drama studio in March 1935. This new studio served as a laboratory for his development of a creative system. He was aided by 11 assistants, including his sister Zinaida Sokolova, his wife Maria Lilina, directors and teachers Maria Knebel and Veniamin Radomyslensky, and several actors from the Moscow Art Theatre: Olga Knipper-Chekhova, Vasily Kachalov, Nikolai Podgorny, Mikhail Kedrov, Leonid Leonidov, Ivan Moskvin, and Olga Androvskaya. Conductor Nikolai Golovanov was the studio's musical director. Twenty individuals were selected for the opera class, 40 for the drama class. The first studio students included future famed actors, such as Pyotr Glebov, Boris Levinson, Liliya Gritsenko, Yury Leonidov, and director Pavel Chomsky. Regular classes began at the studio in the autumn of 1935. Ever since suffering a heart attack, Stanislavsky had met with his student actors at his Moscow home on Leontyevsky Lane. In May 1938 Stanislavsky and the other studio teachers conducted the first exams. Young actors performed fragments from The Three Sisters and The Cherry Orchard by Anton Chekhov, as well as from Sergei Naidyonov's play Vanyushin's Children.

=== Soviet period ===
After the death of Stanislavsky in August 1938, the studio was headed by his student Mikhail Kedrov. In 1940 Kedrov prepared the studio's first full-fledged production, a rendition of Chekhov's The Three Sisters. During World War II the studio was evacuated to Kokand and Fergana, Uzbekistan, where it continued to work. Popular productions during the war years included The Mistress of the Inn, staged by Lidia Novitskaya and based on Carlo Goldoni's comedy The Lady Innkeeper, and The Day of Wonderful Deceptions, staged by Yury Malkovsky after Richard Sheridan's The Duenna.

The studio received official status as the Stanislavsky Opera and Drama Theatre in 1946, and several of its former students joined the company. Many of them continued to work in the theatre to the end of their lives. Two years later, the opera department was abolished, the theatre became known strictly as a drama theatre, and it existed under this name until 2013. Vladimir Dudin served as artistic director from 1948 to 1950. In the second half of the 1940s, Boris Ravensky had great success with productions of Calderon's No Trifling With Love, and Pavel Nilin's In the Silence of the Woods. Boris Flyagin enjoyed success with Deep Are the Roots based on the play by James Gow and Arnaud D'Usseau.

In 1950, the Moscow Stanislavsky Drama Theater moved into the building of the former Ars cinema, and Mikhail Yanshin took over as chief director. Under his leadership the theatre became one of the most popular in all the Soviet Union. Following the death of Joseph Stalin Yanshin staged Mikhail Bulgakov's play The Days of the Turbins, in which the role of Lariosik was played by the young Yevgeny Leonov. Other popular productions of that time included Sergei Yermolinsky's Griboedov and Chekhov's The Seagull.

Many important young actors entered the troupe in the 1950s and 1960s. They included Yury Grebenshchikov, Yevgeni Urbansky, Olga Bgan, Yelizaveta Nikishchikhina, Leonid Satanovsky, Maya Menglet, Vladimir Anisko, Nina Veselovskaya, and Genrietta Ryzhkova. Interspersed among plays by Soviet writers, the theatre staged many works by such foreign playwrights as Bertolt Brecht, Bernard Shaw, Pavel Kohout, and Eduardo de Filippo. The free nature of the repertoire often ran contrary to the requirements of city authorities, frequently forcing the theatre to respond to criticism. A production of Leonid Zorin's On Deck premiered in 1963 despite serious official objections, eventually bringing about Yanshin's resignation.

In 1961, actor Vladimir Korenev was invited to the theatre by Mikhail Yanshin, who led the theatre at the time. Korenev remained at the theatre until at least 2020.

Boris Lvov-Anokhin held the post of chief director from 1963 to 1969, staging the first Soviet production of French playwright Jean Anouilh's Antigone, which had gained popularity in Europe after World War II. It starred Yevgeny Leonov and Yelizaveta Nikishchina in the lead roles. Lvov-Anokhin's productions of Chingiz Aitmatov's Mother's Field, and Mikhail Shatrov's The Sixth of July had great resonance. Lvov-Anokhin brought several important actors into the troupe, including Georgy Burkov, Albert Filozov, Rimma Bykova, and Vasily Bochkaryov.

The well-known director Leonid Varpakhovsky worked here in the first half of the 1970s, staging The Rainmaker, which was a hallmark of the theatre for many years. Otherwise, the early 1970s reflected a period of crisis until Andrei Popov was named chief director in 1976. Significantly, he brought with him three of his prize students, directors Anatoly Vasilyev, Boris Morozov, and Joseph Raihelgauz. Vasilyev's productions, The First Version of Vassa Zheleznova, after the tragedy by Maxim Gorky, and Viktor Slavkin's A Young Man's Grown-up Daughter, were deemed the beginning of a “new theatrical revolution” by critics.

Alexander Tovstonogov took over as the theatre's chief director in 1980. He was one of the first Soviet directors to stage Mikhail Bulgakov's The Heart of a Dog. The theatre also staged plays by a new generation of playwrights: Threshold by Alexei Dudarevref, Noah and His Sons by Yuly Kim, Impromptu Fantasy by Viktoria Tokareva, A Housewarming in an Old House by Alexander Kravtsov, and Sholem Aleichem Street, No. 40 by Arkady Stavitsky.

=== Post-Soviet period ===
Throughout the 1990s and 2000s, the artistic direction of the theater changed frequently as the position of managing director was held unchangingly by Felix Demichev. Chief directors at various times included Roman Kozak, Vitaly Lanskoi, Semyon Spivak, Tatyana Akhramkova, Vladimir Mirzoev, and Alexander Galibin. Productions increasingly reflected the spirit of the times: Vladimir Korenev played a transvestite in Jean-Jacques Bricker and Moris Lasegue's Masculine-Singular. Beginning in 1991 Pyotr Mamonov, the leader of the rock band Zvuki Mu, began to perform at the Stanislavsky Drama Theatre periodically. He first appeared in Oleg Babitsky's production of Bald/Brunet by Daniil Gink, following from 1997 to 2001 in the one-man show Is there Life on Mars? where the musician was both director, actor, and screenwriter, and then finally in a one-man show based on his album called Chocolate Pushkin. The last director to head the theatre before its large-scale reconstruction was Valery Belyakovich. His tenure concluded in July 2013.

== Present ==
Boris Yukhananov, a student of Anatoly Efros and Anatoly Vasilyev, became artistic director of the theatre in the summer of 2013. He came to the position with ideas that radically changed the structure of the stage, the repertoire and the company's manner of work. The new name that he gave the theatre – the Stanislavsky Electrotheatre – paid reverence to the history of both Stanislavsky's studio and the building that housed the former Ars cinema. According to Yukhananov, the renewed theatre would become the most technologically advanced stage space in Moscow. Architects from the Wowhaus bureau – Oleg Shapiro and Dmitry Likin, authors of such acclaimed Moscow projects as the Crimean Embankment, the Pioneer cinema, and temporary architecture at Gorky Park – were engaged to reconstruct the theatre's physical plant. The architects restored a small stage, built a transformer hall, and created modern service rooms, while retaining historic elements as facades, a staircase and a balcony. The theatre lobby was adapted to make space for a cafe as well as space for performances.

The Stanislavsky Electrotheatre opened after reconstruction on January 26, 2015, with a performance of Euripides tragedy The Bacchae, staged by Greek director Theodoros Terzopoulos.

According to Boris Yukhananov, the main task of the renewed theater was to search for a new artistic language. According to the strategy, which the director calls “new processualism,” theatre must become a place for a synthesis of arts - theatre, cinema, music, and literature. Currently, the Stanislavsky Electrotheatre is a modern cultural center that hosts concerts, theatre performances, film screenings, contemporary art exhibits and lectures. Its activities are enhanced by the work of the School of Contemporary Spectators and Listeners, the Word Order bookstore, and the Theater and its Diary publishing series.

In 2021 it was awarded the Fiddler on the Roof Award in the Theatre category.

== Chief and artistic directors ==
- 1935-1938 — Konstantin Stanislavsky
- 1938-1948 — Mikhail Kedrov
- 1948-1950 — Vladimir Dudin
- 1950-1963 — Mikhail Yanshin
- 1963-1969 — Boris Lvov-Anokhin
- 1969-1972 — Ivan Bobylev
- 1972-1976 — Vladimir Kuzenkov
- 1977-1979 — Andrei Popov
- 1980-1989 — Alexander Tovstonogov
- 1991-1992 — Roman Kozak
- 1993-1997 — Vitaly Lanskoi
- 1997-1998 — Alexei Kazantsev
- 2001-2003 — Semyon Spivak
- 2003-2004 — Vladimir Mirzoyev
- 2005-2008 — Tatyana Akhramkova
- 2008-2011 — Aleksandr Galibin
- 2011-2013 — Valery Belyakovich
- 2013-2025 — Boris Yukhananov
