= Chernukha =

Pessimistic genre in Russian art and literature

In Russian culture, chernukha (Russian: чернуха, "black stuff") is a type of narrative in literature, film, and mass media focused on pessimistic description of the everyday life. The concept is often compared or translated with the term "noir": film noir, noir fiction.

== Etymology ==
"Chernukha" is a colloquial word derived from the word "chyorny", 'black' with a noun-generating suffix '-ukha', with pejorative feel, akin to the words mokrukha for killing or pornukha for "pornography."

== History ==
While works of similar type, focused on social issues existed in classic Russian literature since 19th century, the genre of chernukha in literature and arts was identified by critics during the perestroika times of the late 1980s in the Soviet Union to reflect the tendency toward unrelenting pessimism in arts and mass media. Through vivid depictions of prostitutes and gangsters, this ideology represented graphic violence and misery in life in the late Soviet Union. This was in sharp contrast with the universally propagated official Soviet ideology of socialist realism in literature and arts focused on the idealization of the Soviet life.

The iconic representative of chernukha is the 1988 film Little Vera, which shocked the Soviet viewers with the depiction of a prostitute and explicit sexual scenes, unprecedented in the Soviet cinema, along with the depiction of her bleak everyday life.

== Elements ==
A considerable part of chernukha is the depiction of violence. While violence was not shunned in Soviet literature and art, especially in war films, the Soviet censorship limited the ways and the amount of its usage. For example it was normal to portray the "heroic" violence against the enemy and the "evil" violence of the enemies themselves. Nowever overly graphical scenes were not allowed. All films were thoroughly scrutinized by the Goskino, the Soviet governmental agency that controlled film production.

Cultural depictions of sex in Soviet Union until perestroika were absent competely, described by the (misinterpreted) catch phrase "there is no sex in the USSR". Since perestroika the ban was lifted. In chernukha, the focus was not on eroticism, but rather on the ugly sides of sex: prostitution, rape and other types of sexual abuse, etc.

== See also ==
- Naturalism (disambiguation)
- Nordic noir
- Soviet parallel cinema
