= Vladimir Maslov =

Vladimir Maslov (Владимир Анатольевич Маслов/Vladimir Anatolevich Maslov; 15 August 1941, in Leningrad – 20 July 1998) was a Soviet Russian film and theatrical director, noted for his necrorealist works with Yevgeny Yufit.

== Filmography ==
- 1991 Папа, умер Дед Мороз (Papa, umer Ded Moroz) - assistant director
- 1995 Деревянная комната (Derevyannaya komnata) - director (with Yevgeny Yufit)
- 1998 Silver Heads - director (with Yevgeny Yufit)
