= Boris Yukhananov =

Russian stage and film director (1957–2025)

- Борис Юхананов
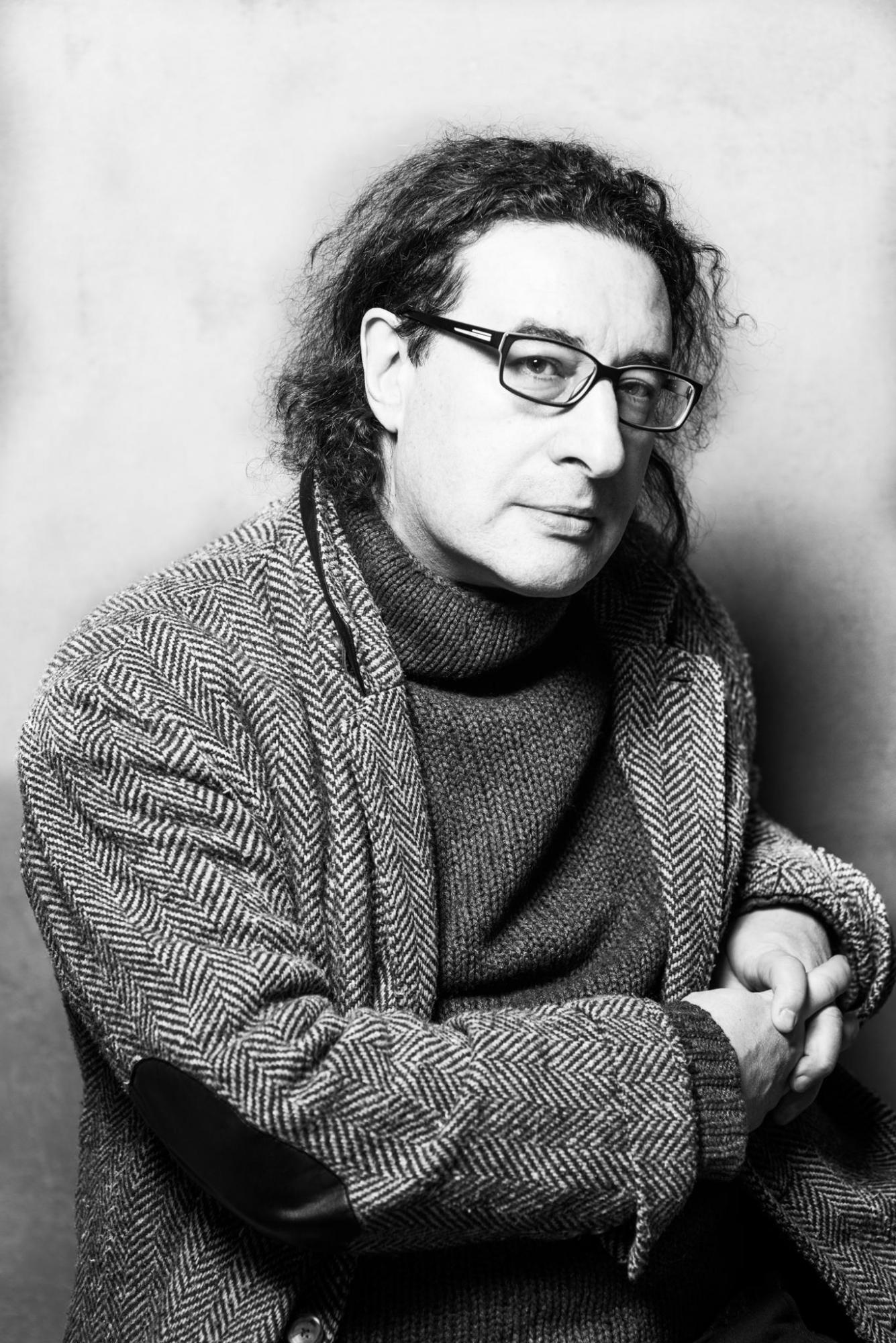
- Yukhananov in 2018
- Born: Boris Yurievich Yukhananov; 30 September 1957; Moscow, Russian SFSR, USSR
- Died: 5 August 2025 (aged 67); Moscow, Russia
- Occupations: Stage and film director

Boris Yuryevich Yukhananov (Russian: Борис Юрьевич Юхананов; 30 September 1957 – 5 August 2025) was a Russian stage, film and television director, theatre educator and theorist. He was the Artistic Director of the Stanislavsky Electrotheatre, Moscow. He was a pioneering figure in Russia’s underground art movement in the 1980s and 1990s and was one of the founders of the Soviet Parallel Cinema movement, which provided an alternative cinema to that which was produced by the state. His major works include a radical interpretation of Maurice Maeterlinck’s The Blue Bird, the opera serial Drillalians and the two-part The Constant Principle. Yukhananov was a founder of the new processualism movement, a methodology and artistic strategy that posits theatre as the focal point of all forms of art involving every aspect of time, whether it be cinema, a musical concert or performance art.

== Early life ==
Yukhananov was born in Moscow on 30 September 1957. In 1974, he began his career as an actor for the Moscow Puppet Theatre. In 1979 he graduated from the Voronezh Institute of Arts, gaining a major in stage and screen acting. He acted for the Bryansk Regional Drama Theatre from 1979 to 1980. During the early 1980s Yukhananov focused his interests on directing and enrolled in the prestigious directing course headed by the renowned Anatoly Efros at GITIS (Russian Theatre Art Academy). The course was run jointly by Efros and the equally famous Soviet director, Anatoly Vasiliev. Yukhananov’s first directing experience was as director's assistant to Anatoly Efros on the 1983 production of The Tempest by Shakespeare. Yukhananov also played the part of Caliban in the production. From 1983 to 1985 Yukhananov was director’s assistant on Vasiliev's now-legendary production of Cerceau, written by Viktor Slavkin. This experience developed Yukhananov’s understanding of theatre, which later influenced his own method of directing. The most notable among Yukhananov’s early experimental projects is Capriccios, based on a record of the trial of Joseph Brodsky in a Soviet court. The lead role in this project was performed by Nikita Mikhailovsky. The subsequent friendship between Yukhananov and Mikhailovsky led to the creation of the aesthetically radical troupe called Teatr Teatr, or, Theatre Theatre.

== Career ==
=== Early career ===
==== Teatr Teatr and the 1980s ====
When Yukhananov graduated from the theatre institute in 1986 he entered a world full of radical change and social upheaval. Mikhail Gorbachev's perestroika program was only just beginning to be implemented. The systematic destruction of the current social order made many individuals question the fundamental principles and traditions, including those in the arts, which had held Soviet society together for seven decades. Yukhananov was one of the first directors to document these changes and express them through his work in cinema and theatre. In 1985 he created Teatr Teatr, the first independent (non-government sponsored) theatre troupe in the Soviet Union, and began experimenting with different genres such as performance art and new media art. He worked with a dynamic team of actors, musicians and artists including; Nikita Mikhailovsky, Larisa Borodina, Yevgeny Chorba, the band Obermaneken featuring Yevgeny Kalachyov, Andrei Zakharishchev-Braush and artists such as Ivan Kochkaryov, Yury Kharikov and Yevgeny Yufit. Teatr Teatr gave rise to a new brand of theatre. In productions such as The Misanthrope, The Fu-funeral, and Mon Repos, Yukhananov introduced his actors to a changeable mise-en-scène in which only the relationships between the actors and their characters were set. Yukhananov refrained from imposing a strict directing method on his actors. Instead he provided a framework within which the actors were free to explore their characters.

=== Soviet Parallel Cinema ===
Along with brothers Igor and Gleb Aleinikov (Moscow) and Yevgeny Yufit (Leningrad), Yukhananov was one of the founders of the Parallel Cinema movement in 1986. Together they created films that stood outside the state film-production system in terms of financing, aesthetics and thematics. During this time the samizdat Cine Fantom magazine was established. It was the first independent magazine about cinema published in the USSR. Yukhananov continues to be a contributing author and member of the editorial board. Yukhananov wrote about his video experiments in articles such as "Theory of Video Direction," "Fatal Editing," "There is Your Head in Your Hands," "Mutant Imago," and others. He mythologized the nature of video and reinterpreted the concept of film editing, rejecting conventional narrative structures. Within the Parallel Cinema framework he created a new art form called "slow video." Through this medium Yukhananov suggested that artistic thinking must be continuous, must "not be text, but rather speech that flows and flows and flows, while seeking to express meaning." According to this theory, the actor's approach to acting in the video format must be based on theatre acting techniques.

=== The Studio of Individual Directing (MIR) and the 1990s ===
In 1988 Yukhananov founded The Leningrad Free University with artist and philosopher Timur Novikov, avant-garde musician Sergey Kuryokhin, the Goroshevsky brothers, Olga Khrustalyovа and poet and novelist Dmitry Volchek. Within the Leningrad Free University, Yukhananov established his own Studio of Individual Directing (MIR), in which he offered aspiring young directors an alternative training to that which was offered by the state. It was a platform for future directors to test the boundaries that existed between film, video and theatre. Yukhananov was not opposed to the kind of teaching that took place in state-run film schools, but he believed that diversity and experimentation and he sought to merge traditional methods with a more avant-garde approach. At the Studio of Individual Directing Yukhananov developed an integrated approach to directing, establishing a strong link between theatre, cinema and video and contemporary art. In the period of 1989 to 1991 Yukhananov directed a piece called Octavia, based on texts by Seneca and an essay about Vladimir Lenin by Leon Trotsky. Many representatives of Moscow’s underground movement took part in this performance, including: The Sever rock band, actress and medium Yekaterina Ryzhikova, Alexander Lugin, composer Kamil Chalaev and writer Avdotya Smirnova, as well as leading actors of the Teatr Teatr company – Nikita Mikhailovsky and Yevgeny Chorba, Maria Pyrenkova, photographer Ilya Piganov, fashion designer Irina Burmistrova, Irina Piganova, Alexander Petlyura and others. The premiere took place in spring, 1989, at the opening of the Free Academy, an educational organization of which Yukhananov was a founder and rector.

Throughout most of the 1990s Yukhananov worked on The Garden (alternatively translated as The Orchard, based on Anton Chekhov's The Cherry Orchard) one of his most famous productions and the first to bring him international attention (it played in London in 1994 and at the Edinburgh Fringe Festival in 1995). Over a period of seven or eight years this production changed radically, going through what the director called eight "regenerations," the last of which took place in 2001. One of the most interesting "regenerations" was the fifth, in 1996, in which important meta-theatrical roles were performed by actors with Down syndrome.

In 1999, Yukhananov began work on an evolutionary version of Faust, based on the first part of the tragedy by Goethe. Over the years this production also went through several editions, or regenerations. The final, sixth, edition was staged at Moscow's School of Dramatic Art in 2009. The first staging in 1999 took place as an entry in the Pushkin and Goethe Festival and lasted approximately 6 hours.

In 1997 Yukhananov headed up a course for directors and actors at RATI. This course within the official Russian state theater institute system lasted until 2002.

=== Artistic Director of the Stanislavsky Electrotheatre ===
In early 2013 the department of Culture in Moscow declared an open competition for the post of Artistic Director at the Stanislavsky Drama Theatre. Applicants were asked to submit their vision and plan for the future of this institution, which had a rich history, but which, in recent years, had fallen into creative decline. The winner, announced in June 2013, was Boris Yukhananov.

In collaboration with The Wowhaus Studio, Yukhananov radically renovated the old building interior - keeping all historical elements intact - and established an artistic program based on two guiding principles: first, the renewed theatre, to be called the Stanislavsky Electrotheatre, would be a ‘director’s theatre’ whose aim was to bring together the notions of avant-garde and accessible theatre; and second, the theatre would actively seek collaborations with the most contemporary and radical directors, composers and designers, both from Russia and other countries. In the theatre's first year of existence it unveiled productions by Theodoros Terzopoulos (The Bacchae by Euripides), Romeo Castellucci (The Human Use of Human Beings), and Heiner Goebbels (Max Black or 62 Ways of Supporting the Head with a Hand). Yukhananov in his theatre seeks to host and create innovative theatre, contemporary opera, unorthodox art exhibitions, installations, performance art and other cutting-edge forms.

Following its opening on 26 January 2015, the Stanislavsky Electrotheatre gained a reputation for being one of Russia’s most progressive theatres.

== Death ==
Yukhananov died from heart failure on 5 August 2025, at the age of 67.

== Opera ==
=== Drillalians ===
Drillalians is an opera series spanning five evenings with music composed by six leading contemporary Russian composers, based on the verse libretto-novel by Boris Yukhananov. All the composers are members of the ‘Structural Resistance Group’ (StRes): Dmitri Kourliandski, Boris Filanovsky, Alexey Sioumak, Sergej Newski, Vladimir Rannev and Alexey Sysoev.

Drillalians recounts the tale of a Drillalian Prince’s journey through time and space. The prince is a magician, a pagan priest and a classical hero. He undertakes his journey in order to save an ancient, other-worldly civilisation called Drillalia from destruction. The opera is set in the future but is interwoven with elements of the past and present. The first prologue to Drillalians premiered at Moscow's ARTPLAY Design Centre in December 2012. The full five-day serial opened in June–July 2015 at the Stanislavsky Electrotheatre.

== Theatre ==
=== Maeterlinck and The Blue Bird ===
Boris Yukhananov’s three-day production of The Blue Bird uses Maurice Maeterlinck’s classic play about a young brother and sister in search of the blue bird of happiness as a starting point, but, in an experiment with documentary drama, it is enhanced by the life stories of Aleftina Konstantinova and Boris Korenev, two of the Electrotheatre’s veteran stars who play the lead roles of the eight and ten-year-old children. Korenev’s tales of stardom as a film actor in the 1960s, and Konstantinova’s tales of surviving WWII combine with their tales about the history of the former Stanislavsky Drama Theatre, as well as of the recent history of the Soviet and Russian nations as a whole. The production features 300 handmade costumes and the set design includes the cross-section of a real Boeing jet fuselage. The premiere took place in February 2015.

Boris Yukhananov, from the interview for the internet edition of Gazeta.ru, 2013; "We want to create a kind of documentary play made according to certain rules, which will become fleshed out in Maeterlinck’s fairytale. Actors will move along the emerging mysteries of memory and their destiny. Their own real recollections, dreams, phantasms will appear. The 80s, 70s, 60s, 50s, 40s- back in childhood, where in the fears and mysteries of children’s experiences the Blue Bird is hiding."

=== The Constant Principle ===
Boris Yukhananov's production of a mystery-play titled The Constant Principle premiered in November 2015 on the main stage of the Electrotheatre Stanislavsky. It is a combination of two plays that run over two consecutive nights. The first night features the performance of The Constant Prince by Pedro Calderón de la Barca; the second combines various scenes from The Constant Prince performed in contrasting contemporary styles and concludes with a so-called "concert in a cemetery," a performance of Alexander Pushkin's A Feast in Time of Plague.

Calderon's play tells the tale of Don Fernando, a Portuguese prince, who is taken prisoner by the Sultan of Morocco after an unsuccessful military expedition. In exchange for his freedom, the prince is ordered by the Sultan to destroy the town of Ceuta, a Catholic stronghold in North Africa. Prince Fernando decides that his life is not worth such a sacrifice. He prefers to live and die as a slave in an Arab prison.

=== The Golden Ass project, 2015 to 2017 ===
Beginning in 2015, newly graduated directors from the Studio of Individual Directing began staging works at the Stanislavsky Electrotheatre based on texts by various Russian and European writers. However, the beginning point was their work on The Golden Ass by Apuleius (this novel, translated into Russian by the great Silver-age poet Mikhail Kuzmin, is generally known in English as The Metamorphosis of Apuleius). Apuleius' story of a would-be magician who mistakenly is turned into an ass, thereby putting the protagonist through 20 years of humiliation and deprivation before he achieves salvation thanks to the goddess Isis, embodied the overall concept of this project. In the spring of 2016 Yukhananov revealed a new aspect of this project, the so-called "open-circuited workspace," in which various directors and actors staging various segments or chapters of The Golden Ass, gave public showings of their work as Yukhananov, in the role of Isis, offered commentary and advice.

=== Orphic Games. Punk-Macrame, 2018 to present ===
Orphic Games. Punk-Macramé premiered in 2018 at the Stanislavsky Electrotheatre. Yukhananov created it with students from the fifth cohort of his Studio of Individual Directing (MIR-5). Based on the myth of Orpheus and on plays by Jean Cocteau and Jean Anouilh, the work consists of 33 acts arranged into 12 performances staged over six days on the theatre's main stage. Individual fragments were directed by MIR-5 students and assembled into a single composition, which the production described as following "the principle of frescoes"; the full cycle was not intended to be seen by one spectator in a single visit. The score was written by the composers Vladimir Gorlinsky, Fyodor Sofronov, Dmitri Kourliandski and Kirill Shirokov.

== Theatre productions ==
- 1986 Khokhorony based on Anton Chekhov, Tennessee Williams, Viktor Slavkin, newspaper articles. Teatr Teatr, S-Petersburg
- 1986 Mon Repos based on Vladimir Nabokov, Brodsky, Molière and original legends by Yukhananov and Yury Kharikov. Teatr Teatr, Moscow/St. Petersburg
- 1986 Le Misanthrope after Molière. Teatr Teatr, Moscow/St. Petersburg
- 1987 AIDS During the Plague, a co-production of Teatr Teatr and Post-teatr, Moscow
- 1987 Vertical Flight, co-produced with the Chempiony Mira (Champions of the World) group, Moscow
- 1988 The Observer after Alexei Shipenko. Premiered at the Metropol theatre at Berlin Festspiele, West Berlin. Performed in Moscow at the School of Dramatic Art
- 1989 Octavia after Seneca and Trotsky. The Free Academy, Moscow
- 1989 A Laboratory Based on Borges, Studio of Individual Directing (MIR-1), St. Petersburg
- 1990 Chuchkhe Principles, Studio of Individual Directing (MIR-2)
- 1990 The Garden, 1st generation. Studio of Individual Directing (MIR-2). A miracle-play in Kratovo near Moscow
- 1990 Black/White, Studio of Individual Directing (MIR-2)
- 1991 The Garden, 1st regeneration. Studio of Individual Directing (MIR-2). Oranzhereya (Greenhouse) Gallery, Moscow
- 1992-1993 The Garden, 2nd regeneration. Studio of Individual Directing (MIR-2). 5-day program at The Kindergarten
- 1993 Cicadas, a ballet. St. Petersburg Little Ballet theatre. Premiered at the Hermitage Imperial theatre, St. Petersburg
- 1994 The Three Reveries ballet, St. Petersburg Little Ballet theatre. Premiered at the Hermitage Imperial theatre, St. Petersburg
- 1994 The Garden, 3rd regeneration. Studio of Individual Directing (MIR-2). Premiered at Michael Hall, Forest Row, London, at the Michael Chekhov festival. Performed in Southwork Playhouse, London, and at School of Dramatic Art, Moscow
- 1995 The Garden, 4th regeneration. Studio of Individual Directing (MIR-2), Contemporary Art Centre, Moscow. Premiered t Mossovet theatre, Moscow. Performed in Church Hill Theatre, Edinburgh, Fringe Festival, "KukArt-95" festival, St. Petersburg
- 1991–1996 Genre: the Drama Game, Studio of Individual Directing (MIR-2). Premiered at Oranzhereya (Greenhouse) Gallery, Moscow. Performed afterwards in The Kindergarten, the Contemporary Art Centre, the School of Dramatic Art
- 1995–1996 Bide and Farewell, Don Juan after Molière. Studio of Individual Directing (MIR-3). Contemporary Art Centre, Moscow. Premiered at "KukArt-95" festival, St. Petersburg. Performed afterwards at School of Dramatic Art, Moscow
- 1996 The Garden, 5th regeneration. Studio of Individual Directing (MIR-2), School of Dramatic Art, Moscow
- 1996 The Seagull after Anton Chekhov. Studio of Individual Directing (MIR-2), School of Dramatic Art, Moscow
- 1997 The Garden, 6th regeneration. Shkola (School) festival, School of Dramatic Art, Kyiv
- 1998 The Crystal, a mysterial project for the Dakh center of contemporary art, Kyiv
- 1998 The Constant Prince, a mysterial project. Actors/directors course, Russian Academy of Theatre Arts (GITIS), Moscow
- 1998 The Garden, 7th regeneration. The Studio of Individual Directing. Premiered at the To School festival within The Garden project at the V. Vysotsky theatre/museum, Moscow
- 1998 Don Juan, the Royal Rehearsal, The Studio of Individual Directing. Premiered at the To School festival within The Palace project. Vladimir Vysotsky theatre/museum, Moscow
- 1998 Marquise de Sade after Mishima. The Studio of Individual Directing. Premiered at the To School festival within The Palace project. Vladimir Vysotsky theatre/museum, Moscow
- 1999 Faust after Goethe. Premiered at the Pushkin and Goethe festival, Moscow, supported by the Goethe Institute, Moscow
- 1999 Faust, 2nd edition. The Young Spectator Theatre, Moscow
- 1999 The Minor after Denis Fonvizin. The Russian Drama Theatre of Lithuania, Vilnius. Participant of The Second Festival of Russian Theatres of the CIS and Baltia (St. Petersburg, 2000)
- 2001 Theatre and its Diary, a project encompassing three works: Archaeology by Alexei Shipenko, The Constant Prince, and Bothmer Gymnastics
- 2001 Rehearsals of the Sunflowers or The Outcry, after Tennessee Williams' Two-Character Play, featuring Lia Akhedzhakova and Viktor Gvozditsky, Moscow
- 2001 Faust, 3rd edition. The Studio of Individual Directing (MIR) – POZITIV Producer Centre. Premiered March 15 at the Stanislavsky Drama Theatre, Moscow
- 2001 The Garden, 8th regeneration. Shown June 6–7 within the Third International Theatre Olympics at Meyerhold Centre, Moscow.
- 2002 Faust, 4th edition at the Stanislavsky Drama Theater, Moscow
- 2002 Sunflowers, a performance shown at various festivals: "Baltiisky Dom" St. Petersburg; "Slavyansky Bazar" Vitebsk; "Sibirsky transit" Irkutsk; "Kamerata" Chelyabinsk
- 2002 Theater and its Diary, premiere of a theatrical project for the New Drama festival, Moscow
- 2003 Faust, 5th edition, premiered at the School of Dramatic Art
- 2004 The Tale of an Upright Man, premiered at the School of Dramatic Art (see TheatreForum)
- 2005–2006 The Marathon, LaboraTORIA, Moscow
- 2005 The Diaspora Symphony, LaboraTORIA. Moscow
- 2007–2011 LaboraTORIA. Golem a performance-project performed at the School of Dramatic Art, Moscow, "Tikkun olam" (Vienna, 2007) and "Gogolfest" (Kyiv, 2008)
- 2009 Faust, 6th edition, School of Dramatic Art
- 2015 The Blue Bird, a trilogy based on the fairytale by Maurice Maeterlinck and the real-life stories and memories of the actors Vladimir Korenev and Aleftina Konstantinova
- 2015 The Constant Prince, a duology based on Caledron's The Constant Prince and Alexander Pushkin's A Feast in Time of Plague
- 2015 Drillalians, an opera serial that runs over five nights
- 2016 The Golden Ass project whose genre is described as "the open-circuited workspace"
- 2017 Octavia.Trepanation, an opera that premiered at the Holland Festival
- 2017 Galileo: Opera for Violin and Scientist premiered at the Stanislavsky Electrotheatre
- 2018 Orphic games. Punk-macrame
- 2019 Pinocchio
- 2023 MIRRIM

== Cinema and video works ==
- 1983 The Toy, a short, 35 mm, operator Vladimir Bryljakov
- 1986 Private residence, chapter one of The Mad Prince, a video novel in 1000 cassettes. The final version is in production
- 1986 Reverse perspective, after an article by Pavel Florensky. The final version is in production
- 1986 Cafe, the final version is in production
- 1987-2005 Game in ХО, chapter two of The Mad Prince, a video novel in 1000 cassettes.
- 1988-2005 The Mad Prince Fassbinder, chapter three of The Mad Prince, a video novel in 1000 cassettes
- 1988-2005 Hamlet, chapter four of The Mad Prince, a video novel in 1000 cassettes. The final version is in production
- 1988-2005 The Mad Prince Esther, chapter five of The Mad Prince, a video novel in 1000 cassettes
- 1988 Theatre Theatre, after Dialogues by Plato
- 1988 Dreams of the Queen
- 1988 Self-portrait, a plug-in chapter of The Mad Prince, a video novel in 1000 cassettes
- 1989 Photographer, a plug-in chapter of The Mad Prince, a video novel in 1000 cassettes
- 1989 King Kong
- 1989 Interview, a plug-in chapter of The Mad Prince, a video novel in 1000 cassettes
- 1989 A film about Theatre Theatre
- 1989 The Mad Prince Actor, chapter eight of The Mad Prince, a video novel in 1000 cassettes. The final version is in production
- 1989 Wings, a video
- 1989 Octavia, chapter nine of The Mad Prince, a video novel in 1000 cassettes. The final version is in production
- 1989 The Zoo
- 1990 Mad Prince Godard, Leben nach Tot festival, Hamburg. This film was lost in the Hamburg subway
- 1990 The Garden, based on The Cherry Orchard by Anton Chekhov, 13 hours matrix
- 1991 Tractor Drivers 2, actor, the gang boss
- 1992 The Mad Prince Nikita, chapter twelve of The Mad Prince, a video novel in 1000 cassettes
- 1995 Uncontrollable for Anybody, a video film
- 1996 The Garden: the 5th Regeneration'
- 1997 Da Dauny! (Yes! Downs!), a documentary
- 1997 Zenboxing, a feature film, producer, co-writer
- 2005 The Garden: the 8th regeneration, a TV film
- 2011 Chapiteau, (director S.Loban), feature film, producer
- 2011 Branded, feature film (USA-Russia), executive producer
- 2017 Nazidanie (Edification), a documentary-mystery
- 2023 Pinocchio

== Television works ==
- 1989 Program about independent Russian video for Hungarian TV
- 1990 Pop Culture, a TV-show, the Bridge broadcasting company, Russia channel
- 1995 No budget, a special heading for the Cinematograph TV program (over 10 series), ORT (1st channel)
- 1996 Moscow. 20th century, an art-documentary film about Andrei Bely's novel Moscow (2 series), ORT (1st Channel)
- 1999 INDUCTIVE TV the National serial, producer, screenplay, director
- 2003 Hunger, production director of reality show, Berlin – Moscow, channel «ТNТ»
- 2008 onwards - Mystical Travels, art director, producer, channel «ТNТ»
- Nazidanie (Edification), a television novel (work in progress)
