= Necrorealism =

Russian art movement

Necrorealism is a Russian art movement primarily focusing on black humor and the absurd. Russia artist and filmmaker Yevgeny Yufit (1961–2016) is generally considered the father of the movement. The name is a parody of the term Socialist realism.

Other early Necrorealists included Igor Bezrukov, Yevgeniy Kondratiev, and Konstantin Mitenev. Their film-making efforts in the 1980s outside of the official Soviet Goskino State Cinema system became known as Parallel Cinema. Necrorealist works often explore the themes of death, decay, and the transformation of the body.
