= Silver Heads =

- Directed by: Yevgeny Yufit
- Written by: Vladimir Maslov; Yevgeny Yufit
- Starring: Tatiana Verkhovskaya; Vasily Deryagin; Valery Krishtapenko
- Cinematography: Aleksandr Burov
- Edited by: E. Karpova; A. Burmistrova
- Music by: Giya Kancheli
- Production company: Mosfilm
- Release date: 1998
- Running time: 82 minutes
- Country: Russia
- Language: Russian

Silver Heads (Russian: Серебряные головы, romanized: Serebryanniye golovy) is a 1998 Russian science fiction film directed by Yevgeny Yufit.

== Plot ==
Scientists begin to conduct a secret experiment, the purpose of which is to study the interaction of man and tree in the course of their interfusion — through the fusion of human and tree molecules. The conceived experiment is far-fetched, but the result, which scientists expect to get, is very tempting — the man-tree will be stable with respect to the aggressive environment, durable, very unpretentious ...

A small group of scientists is sent to a remote forest range, who want to be both researchers and experimental participants. However, the forest is not deserted, as scientists thought. Firstly, there lives a forester with his family (wife and son) and a dog. Secondly, strange creatures wander through the forest, left here after a previous phantasmagorical experiment.

== Cast ==
- Tatiana Verkhovskaya
- Vasily Deryagin
- Valery Krishtapenko
- Nikolai Marton
- Vladimir Maslov
- Alexander Polovtsev
- Sergey Chernov
- Daniil Zinchenko
