= Tractor Drivers 2 =

- Release date: 1992

Tractor Driver 2 is an absurd tragicomedy directed by Gleb and Igor Aleynikov, based on Renata Litvinova's script. The plot is loosely based on famous Soviet films: Tractor Drivers, Wedding in Malinovka (where one of the main characters, Nazar Duma, is namesake to a character from the previous film), and The Meeting Place Cannot Be Changed.

== Plot ==
Klim Yarko, a former tank driver, wants to find a peaceful job as a tractor driver. He falls in love with Maryana Bazhan and begins working in a successful collective farm, whose director is Maryana's father. However, he has a rival, Nazar Duma, a tractor driver in his 40s. On the other hand, the neighboring farm is getting bankrupt, and its youth creates a gang and terrorizes the farm where Klim works. The competition between two farms results in a bloody feud.

== Cast ==
- Yevgueni Kondratyev — Klim Yarko, tractor driver
- Larisa Borodina — Maryana Bazhan, master of speed plowing
- Aleksandr Belyavsky — Nazar Duma
- Anatoly Kuznetsov — Kirill Petrovich, director of the collective farm
- Boris Yukhananov — gang boss
- Yury Vnukov — hairstylist
- Irina Cherichenko — Franya
- Larisa Luzhina — Markovna
