= My Boyfriend Came Back from the War =

Internet artwork by Olia Lialina

Screenshot

My Boyfriend Came Back From the War is a browser-based internet artwork created in 1996 by Russian artist Olia Lialina.

== The work ==
My Boyfriend Came Back From the War is an example of interactive hypertext storytelling. The work consists of nested frames with black and white web pages and (sometimes animated) grainy GIF images. When clicking hyperlinks in the work, the frame splits into smaller frames and the user reveals a nonlinear story about a couple that is reunited after a nameless military conflict. The lovers find it difficult to reconnect; the woman confesses that she had an affair with a neighbour, while the returned soldier proposes marriage. The story unfolds to the point where the screen becomes a mosaic of empty black frames.

Olia Lialina calls the work a netfilm, because of its similarity with cinematic narrative. The grainy black-and-white images and intertitles refer to early silent movies. Of its filmic qualities, curator Michael Connor wrote of the work, "the work adapts cinematic montage to the web ... separate frames are joined together by HTML code and the browser itself and experienced in both space and in time, employing what Lev Manovich has characterized as spatial and temporal montage."

== Remixes ==
Starting in 1998, My Boyfriend Came Back From the War was remixed and adapted by a number of artists. Some examples of these adaptations include JODI's Wolfenstein mod and Marton Fernezelyi's video adaptation.

== Reception and exhibitions ==
My Boyfriend Came Back From the War is recognized a seminal internet artwork; art critic Josephine Bosma has called it "one of the most influential net art pieces of the mid nineties." It is included in various college syllabi, including the University of Maryland and the Emily Carr University of Art and Design.

On the occasion of the work's 20th anniversary in 2016, Haus der elektronischen Künste Basel gave My Boyfriend Came Back From the War a solo presentation, using emulation, historical equipment and alongside remixes of the work. A fully illustrated monograph edited by Sabine Himmelsbach, curator of HeK Basel, accompanied the exhibition. The exhibition also toured to MU Artspace, Eindhoven.

In December 2016, Rhizome selected the work for its Net Art Anthology online exhibition, comprising 100 net art works that define the form.
