= Olia Lialina =

Russian internet artist and theorist

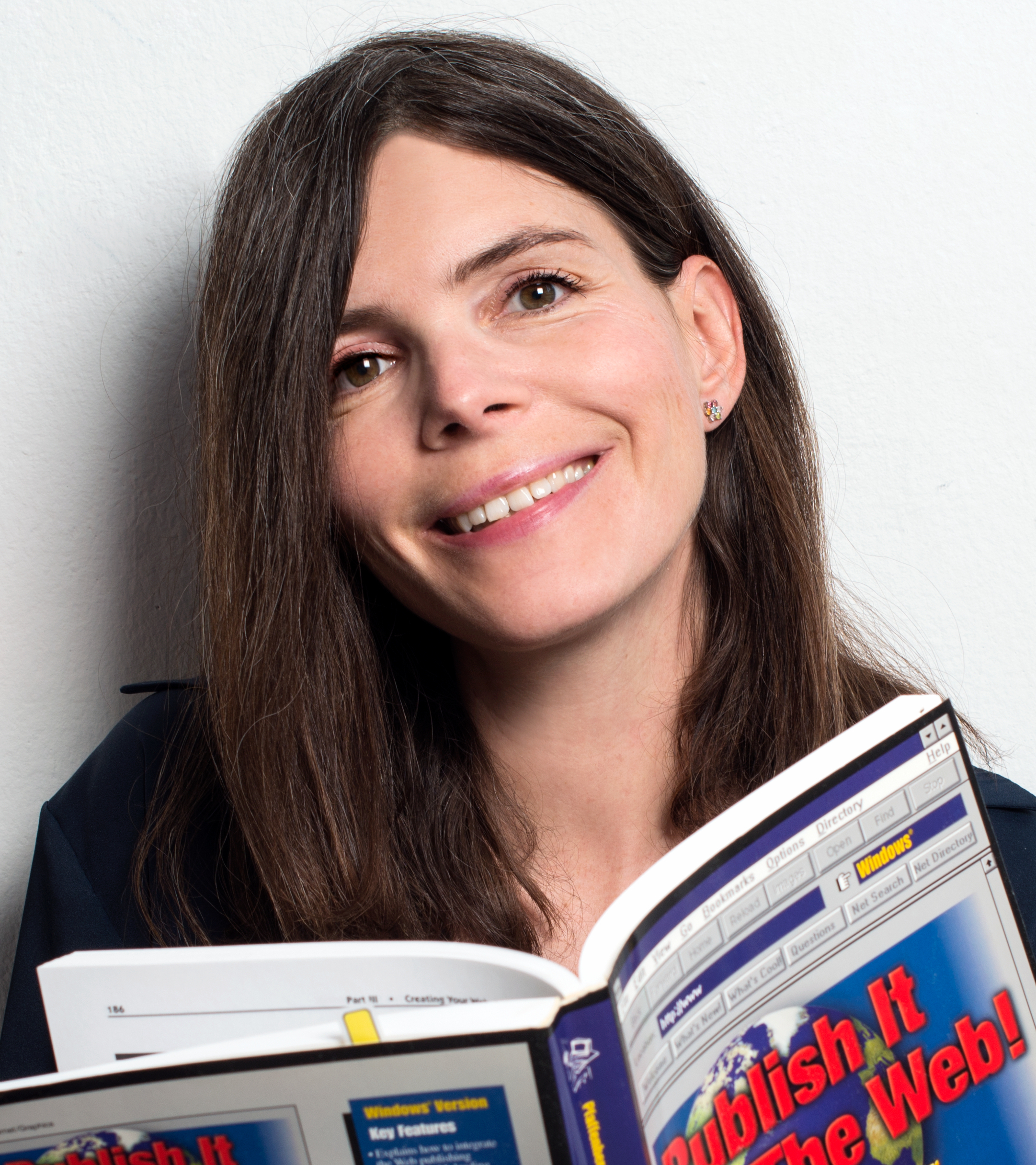
- Lialina in 2018
- Born: 4 May 1971 (age 55); Moscow, Soviet Union
- Education: Moscow State University
- Known for: Internet art, Net art, Theory
- Notable work: My Boyfriend Came Back from the War
- Movement: net.art

Olia Lialina (Russian: Оля Лялина, May 4, 1971, in Moscow) is an Internet artist and theorist, an experimental film and video critic and curator.

== Life ==
Lialina graduated in 1993 after studying film criticism and journalism at Moscow State University, followed by art residencies at C3 (Budapest, 1997) and Villa Waldberta (Munich, 1998).

In 1994 she was one of the founders, and later director, of Cine Fantom, an experimental cinema club in Moscow that she co-founded together with Gleb Aleinikov, Andrej Silvestrov, Boris Ukhananov, Inna Kolosova and others.

Lialina taught at New Media Lab (Moscow, 1994), Joint Art Studios (Moscow, 1995), University of Westminster (London, 1997), MUU (Helsinki, 1997), Kunst Academiet (Trondheim, 1998); Fachhochschule (Augsburg, 1998), University of Graz (1998) and Akademie der Bildenden Künste München (Munich, 1998–99). In 1999 Lialina became a teacher and course director at the New Media pathway program at the Merz Akademie in Stuttgart. She is a pioneer in net art and one of the first to make art for networked browsers.

== Work ==
=== Artworks (selection) ===
Art Teleportacia is the online gallery of Lialina's work. Some of her artwork is maintained in the computerfinearts collection at the Rose Goldsen Archive of New Media Art, Cornell University.

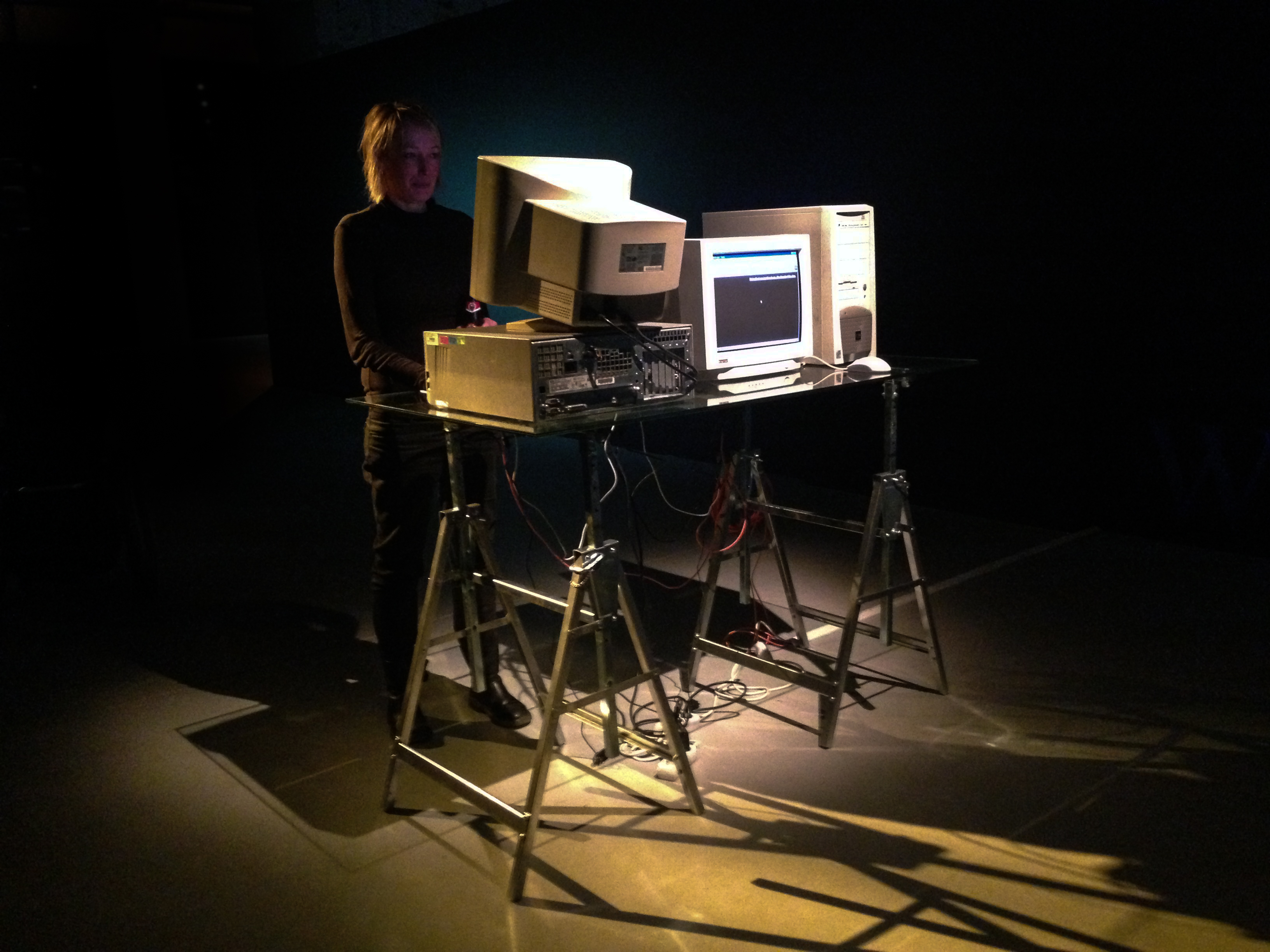
My Boyfriend Came Back from the War at MU Artspace, Eindhoven, 2016.

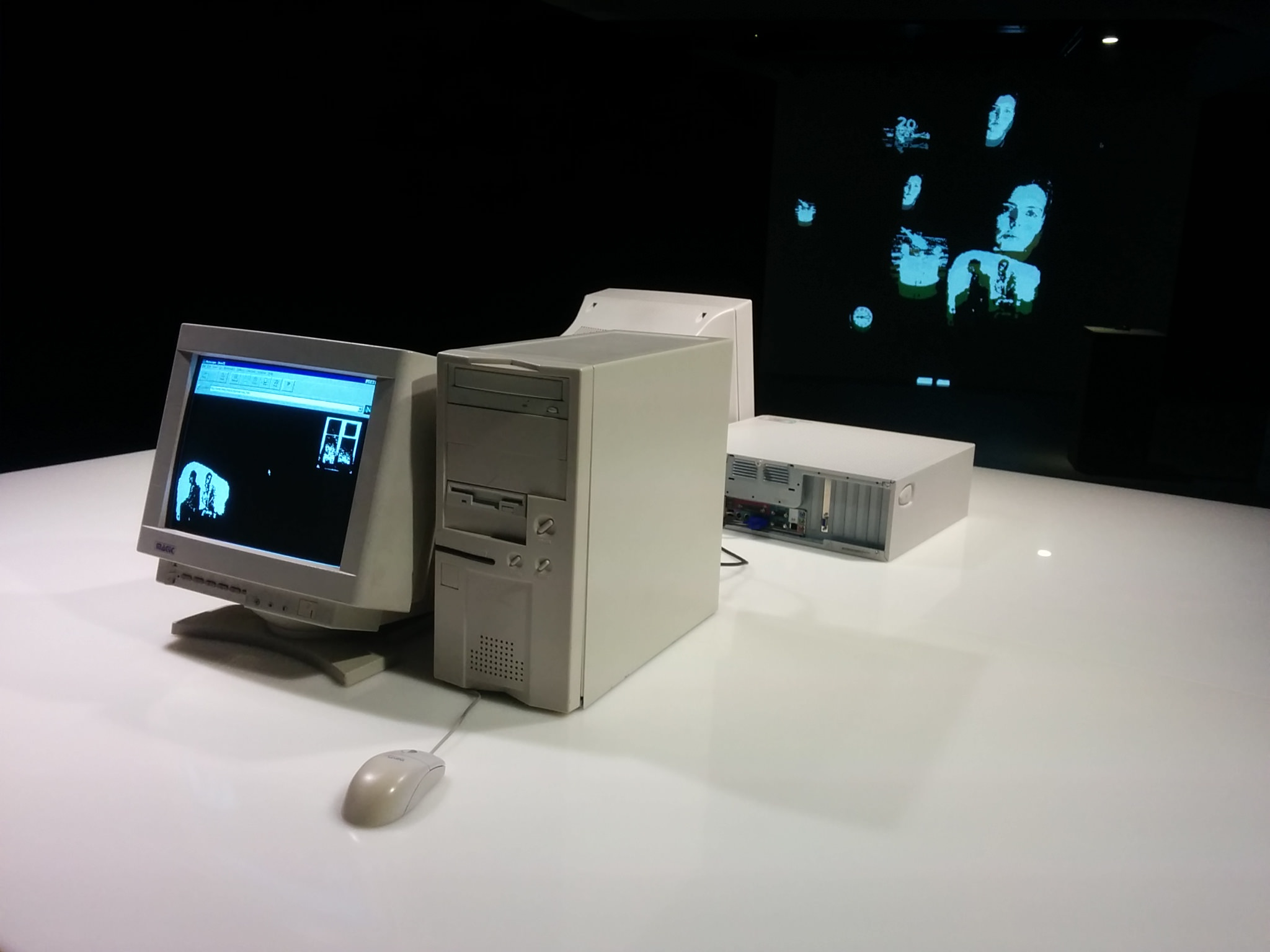
My Boyfriend Came Back from the War at HeK, Basel, 2016.

- My Boyfriend Came Back from the War (1996) is a work of internet art. Its 20th anniversary was marked by exhibitions in Basel and Eindhoven in 2016, including presentations using emulation and legacy hardware.

Using black-and-white GIF images and HTML frames, Lialina constructs a nonlinear hypertext narrative about a couple reunited after the man's return from war. Their conversation alludes to infidelity, the trauma of war, and a marriage proposal. As viewers follow links, the browser window divides into increasingly smaller frames, revealing different parts of the story through images and text.

- Since 1998, My Boyfriend Came Back From The War, considered a classic in internet art, was appropriated and remixed by various other new media artists in many different forms, from Flash and a 3D environment in the Castle Wolfenstein game engine to a video and PowerPoint. This remix project is entitled The Last Real Net Art Museum. It includes versions of the work by JODI, Constant Dullaart and Auriea Harvey & Michaël Samyn, among many others. In November 2016, the work was featured in Rhizome's Net Art Anthology.
- Agatha Appears (1997) is a story told through the title elements of hyperlinks. Man.gif meets woman.jpeg, he introduces her to the Internet, she is teleported there and is never alone again.
- From 2001 to 2003, Olia Lialina created a web comic named Zombie and Mummy with Dragan Espenschied. The comic contained the characters Zombie, a zombie, and Mummy, a mummy. Each comic was created on a Palm Pilot, and was designed to be mediocre on purpose. Comics consisted of usually 4 panels each, beginning with "Zombie and Mummy..." followed by the comic title. The story would then progress, until a simple (usually) conclusion would be reached, and "The End" would be displayed in bubble letters dripping with blood. Each comic was embedded into a webpage, some Olia's own creation, some taken from other sources. The webpages were usually styled after typical GeoCities-like websites at the time.
- The most beautiful web page (2002) is a web page which appears to be as the link states "some universe". The link to the page is in the words which appear in the middle of the page and read "SOME UNIVERSE for heike, dragan and your browser" when clicked on, a new web page appears in which one must scroll using the page down on your keyboard. While doing this the various spots of color on the black background appear to twinkle and move. Throughout the scrolling there are different images that appear, at times there are stripes of color which look as if they are moving in the opposite direction of the rest of the site. Finally at the bottom of the page five images can be seen, including a horizontal stripe of sparkling purple lights.
- Peeman.gif (2014–2017) is a gif of a small figure peeing and is usually coupled with a second image for him to urinate on.
- Treasure Trove (2017) is an "expropriation of glitter and bling" it includes several gifs stacked on top of each other until the screen is filled with glittering images.
- Online Newspapers (2004) is a webpage that features various newspapers from around the world, interspersed with GIFs. There are five different newspapers from different parts of the world in order from left to right.
  1. Frankfurter Allgemeine Zeitung, August 2, 2004, with a GIF of roses,
  2. Daily Jang, August 6, 2004, with colored sphere animations,
  3. USA TODAY, with GIFs of American flags and of the Statue of Liberty. The date for this newspaper is August 9, 2004 and when scrolled over the part entitled "Election Officials Act to Stop Snags" the same newspaper is revealed without the GIFs, in black and white.
  4. The Wall Street Journal Europe, with a GIF of animals, dates from August 4, 2004.
  5. Dajiyuan, August 4, 2004, containing GIFs of Street Fighter.
- Olia Lialina as animated GIF model
  Animated GIF Model (2005–2012) is a digital performance where Olia Lialina spreads her own image, in animated GIF format, over the World Wide Web. In 2016 this work has been acquired in the collections of the Stedelijk Museum Amsterdam and Museum of the Image (MOTI) Breda, in the form of GIF files for Tumblr, as a video installation for a museum, and as GIF files that must be spread via social media. The animated GIF file format saw a large-scale revival in the early 2010s on platforms like Tumblr and 4chan and entered the mainstream digital culture of Facebook around 2014. Like a digital anthropologist, Lialina collects and researches the most important types of images used online, and she re-interprets them in an artistic way.
- Give Me Time/This Page is No More (2015–) is an installation that documents two phases in the life cycle of GeoCities websites. Hundred-sixty 35mm slides are projected on a wall by two slide projects, showing screenshots of GeoCities' websites that promise future development on the left, and pages announcing their shutdown on the right. The installation has been presented at a.o. The New Museum, Aksioma, ArtProjects, Bethanien, HKMV, and The Kitchen.

=== Writing and research ===
Olia Lialina regularly writes and publishes about new media, digital folklore, amateur or vernacular web design, the early history of home pages and the early conventions of the web. Her essays, projects and publications include:

- A Vernacular Web. Indigenous and Barbarians (2005), talk at the conference A Decade of Webdesign (Amsterdam) and essay
- Vernacular Web 2 (2007)
- Buerger, Manuel; Espenschied, Dragan; Lialina, Olia; Merz-Akademie (2009). Digital folklore. Stuttgart: Merz & Solitude. ISBN 978-3-937982-25-0. OCLC 664057508.
- One Terabyte of Kilobyte Age (2011-), a project with Dragan Espenschied. Lialina and Espenschied downloaded the entire GeoCities archive (GeoCities was shut down in 2009) and regularly and automatically publish screenshots of GeoCities websites on a Tumblr blog.
- Prof. Dr. Style, Vernacular Web 3 (2010)
- In 2012, Lialina coined the term "Turing Complete User" in an essay of the same name. The piece was well received internationally and was reviewed by Bruce Sterling and Cory Doctorow, among others.
- In 2015, the preface of Digital Folklore, co-written by Lialina and Espenschied, was included alongside an edited excerpt of Lialina's essay "Turing Complete User" in Mass Effect: Art and the Internet in the Twenty-First Century co-published by MIT Press and New Museum of Contemporary Art.

== Reception ==
My Boyfriend Came Back From the War was analyzed in "Women Innovate: Contributions to Electronic Literature (1990–2010).
