= Mikhail Kedrov (actor) =

Russian theatre director

- Михаил Кедров
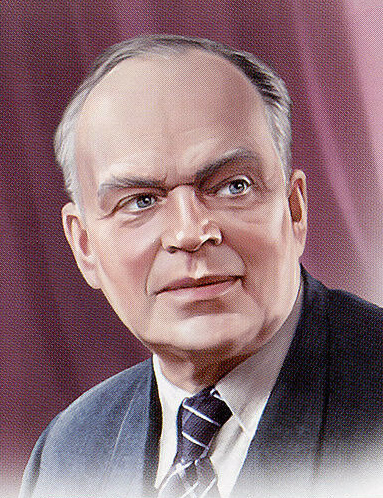
- Illustration of Kedrov on a 2018 postcard
- Born: 2 January [O.S. 21 December 1893] 1894; Moscow, Russian Empire
- Died: March 22, 1972 (aged 78); Moscow, Russian SFSR, Soviet Union
- Occupations: Stage director; actor; teacher

Mikhail Nikolayevich Kedrov (Note: Russian: Михаил Николаевич Кедров, romanized: Mikhail Nikolayevich Kedrov) (2 January [O.S. 21 December 1893] 1894 – 22 March 1972), was a Soviet stage director, actor and pedagogue who managed the Moscow Art Theatre between 1946 and 1955. He is considered one of Konstantin Stanislavski's most brilliant disciples.

The son of an Orthodox priest from Moscow, Kedrov studied for six years in a divinity school. His wife Maria Titova (1899–1994) joined Stanislavski's company in 1924. Kedrov was awarded the title of People's Artist of the USSR (1948) and was the winner of four Stalin Prizes first degree (1946, 1949, 1950, 1952). He headed the Stanislavski school in Moscow and taught Yuri Lyubimov, among many other notable actors. He died in Moscow and was buried at Vagankovo Cemetery.
