= Cine Fantom =

Film club in Russia

Cine Fantom is a film club in Russia.

The name and the history of the club comes from the samizdat handwritten magazine CINE FANTOM issued by Igor Aleinikov and his brother Gleb Aleinikov since 1985. Olia Lialina, one of the original founders, was later a director. It was dedicated to history and theory of cinema. It had no officials analogs in the Soviet Union at this time. CINE FANTOM was associated with the Soviet cinema underground, Parallel Cinema (Parallelnoe Kino).

The club was established in 1995 based at the Moscow Cinema Museum. Since 2004, it has been based at Fitil Cinema, Moscow.

The 35th International Film Festival Rotterdam hosted a large program "Days of the CINE FANTOM Club”. The 17th Kinotavr hosted the Club program as well.

Cine Fantom Club programs have been screened at the Grenz Land Filmtage (Selb, 1995), the European Media Art Fest (Osnabruck, 1998), the Cottbus Film Festival (1995). In January 1999, works of the Cine Fantom Club were screened at the Anthology Film Archives in New York as part of an extensive program, Recent Russian Experimental Films.

From 2017 Cine Fantom Club based in Electrotheatre Stanislavsky
