= Leonid Varpakhovsky =

Leonid Viktorovich Varpakhovsky (Russian: Леонид Викторович Варпаховский; 29 March 1908 in Moscow – 12 February 1976 in Moscow) was a director, scenarist. A theatre in Montreal (Canada) that bears his name has been opened in 1995. People's Artist of the RSFSR (1966).
