= There is no sex in the USSR =

Russian catchphrase

There is no sex in the USSR (Russian: В СССР секса нет, romanized: V SSSR seksa net) is a Russian catchphrase that comes from the words of a Soviet participant of the Leningrad, Boston "tele-bridge" titled "Women Talk to Women", recorded on June 28 and broadcast on July 17, 1986.

== History ==
In 1986, two television hosts, the Soviet Vladimir Pozner and the American Phil Donahue, organized one of the first "tele-bridge" broadcasts of the Glasnost era, directed by Vladimir Mukusev. During the discussion, an American participant posed a question to Russian women:

Television commercials have a lot to do with sex in our country. Do you have commercials on the television?

The Soviet participant Ludmila Ivanova, an administrator in Hotel Leningrad and a representative of the "Committee of Soviet Women" replied:

We have no sex, and we are strictly opposed to it!

The phrase was drowned in laughter and applause. Ludmila also added, concluding the sentence: "We have no sex – we have love". Another Soviet participant said loudly:

We do have sex, we don't have commercials!

In popular culture, the phrase morphed into "There is no sex in the USSR", excluding the concluding "we have love".

== In culture ==
The phrase "There is no sex in the USSR" is widely used in Russian to describe the prejudice and antisexualism of the Soviet culture and taboos of public discussion of topics related to sex. Conversely, supporters of the past Soviet regime mention it as an example of a phrase taken out of context by the Soviet Union's detractors.

- A character of a bureaucrat played by Alexander Shirvindt in Eldar Ryazanov's 1987 comedy Forgotten Melody for a Flute is apologizing for allowing informal art by saying "There is no sex".
- The phrase is mentioned several times in the 1990 Soviet-Polish comedy Deja Vu.
- The phrase inspired the title of the 2004 Russian television drama Union Without Sex.

== Citations ==
In an interview to Komsomolskaya Pravda in 2004, Ivanova herself presented a somewhat different version of the story:

The tele-bridge started, and an American woman said that because of the war in Afghanistan we should stop having sex with our men, and they won't go to fight. And she kept pointing her finger. So I answered: "In the USSR, there's no sex, there is love. During the war in Vietnam, you also didn't stop sleeping with your men." But everyone remembered just the beginning of the phrase. Am I not right? In our culture, the word "sex" was always almost offensive. We always had not sex, but love. That's what I meant.

The fact that Ivanova completed the phrase by saying "We have love" was confirmed by the tele-bridge's director Vladimir Mukusev:

When I was editing the broadcast, Ivanova phoned the studio and asked me to remove the phrase. I had a dilemma. I realized that after the broadcast, Ludmila may have problems with her family and friends and with other people, and that she'll become the butt of jokes. On the other hand, removing from the broadcast the thing that best connected the two studios [Soviet and American]—the humor, seemed impossible to me. I left the "historical" phrase in, even though I attracted its author's ire.

Ivanova later emigrated to Germany.

== Historical notes ==
American ethnographer Kristen Ghodsee said that the sexual life of women under socialism was, in fact, richer than under capitalism thanks to the greater economic independence.

The "tele-bridge" incident was used by Polish linguist Anna Wierzbicka as an example of the fact that even though sex as a phenomenon is "a given of human life", a word meaning sex does not exist in most languages of the world as it does in English, and when it does exist, it is often a loanword from English.
