= Konstantin Mitenev =

Russian artist and filmmaker

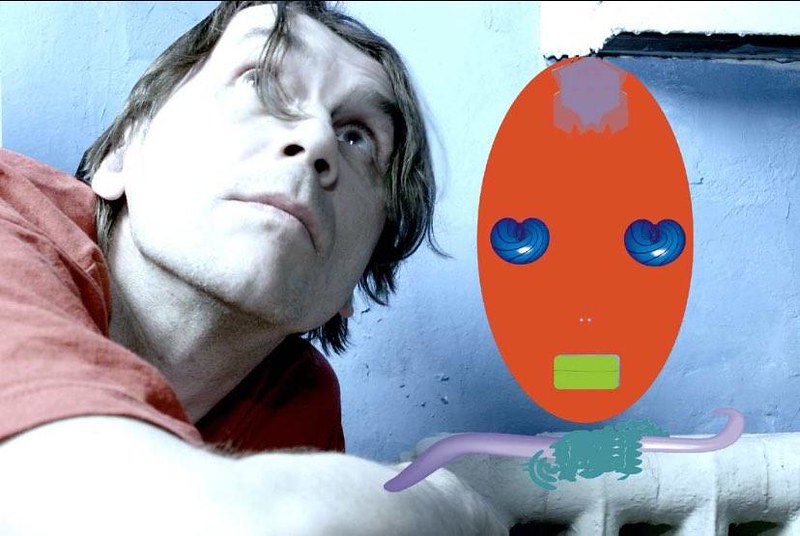
- Born: Konstantin Vitalyevich Mitenev; 18 May 1956
- Education: Leningrad Politechnical Institute
- Known for: poetry, cinema, New Artist movement: necrorealist, new media art
- Movement: net art

Konstantin Vitalyevich Mitenev (born May 18, 1956) is a Russian–Swiss artist, filmmaker, film actor, author.

== Biography ==
In 1984, Mitenev joined the film studio Mzhalalafilm.

As an artist, Konstantin Mitenev was actively involved in Leningrad's underground art scene in the 1980s.

Mitenev began to engage in new media art after the international video festival "OSTranenie" at the Bauhaus, Dessau, in 1993.

Since the early 90s, he took part in the net art movement.

In 1996, he created the artistic projects UnDiNa (United Digital Nations) and Xyman (constructor of the body) with Alla Mitrofanova. In the same year, Konstantin Mitenev organized with Alla Mitrofanova the first Russian cyber-expedition NETMAN. He created the first network TV in Russia called Twins TV in 1997. Mitenev opened the first online art gallery in Russia, BioNet. He published a manifesto – Next Media.

At the suggestion of Geert Lovink, Konstantin Mitenev has organized A Great Clone Party, the world's first sound stream via the Internet between St. Petersburg and nine cities (Linz – Paris – Berlin – Geneva – Lausanne – St. Petersburg – Kobe – San Francisco). He called his computer Masha Pentium as a co-author (from now he signs as Kostya Mitenev & Masha Pentium – k@m).

Konstantin Mitenev met Bruce Sterling in St. Petersburg in late 90s. Later Mitenev became a character in his book Zeitgeist (necrorealist Viktor Bilibin). At the same time Konstantin Mitienev corresponded with curator Inke Arns.

In 2015, he held an art picket at the 56th Venice Biennale with an art picket Separation of Art From the State.

In 2022, he went to Venice for a collective exhibition with his thesis "Do Art, Not War". In the same year, Mitenev participated in an anti-war exhibition in Geneva. Also Mitenev took part in international media art festival CYFEST-14.

Konstantin Mitenev lives and works in Lausanne, Switzerland.

Konstantin Mitenev's works are in the collection of Kuryokhin Center, St. Petersburg, in the archives of CYLAND Media Art Lab.
