= Yevgeny Yufit =

- Born: 1961
- Died: 13 December 2016
- Occupations: Filmmaker; Painter; Photographer

Yevgeny Yufit (also known as Evgenii Iufit; 1961 – 13 December 2016) was a Russian filmmaker, photographer and painter, born in Leningrad. He was a founding member of the Soviet parallel cinema movement.

Yufit first became famous for his macabre short films, which, like the films of Guy Maddin, often looked as though they had been made during the 1920s or 1930s. In the 1990s, Yufit began making features similar in style to his shorts, with plots often centered on genetic experimentation and pseudoscience. His most notable feature film is Silver Heads, made in 1998. He is often described as a necrorealist. He died on 13 December 2016 in Petergof.
